= Gerrit Bicker =

Dutch merchant & patrician (1554–1604)

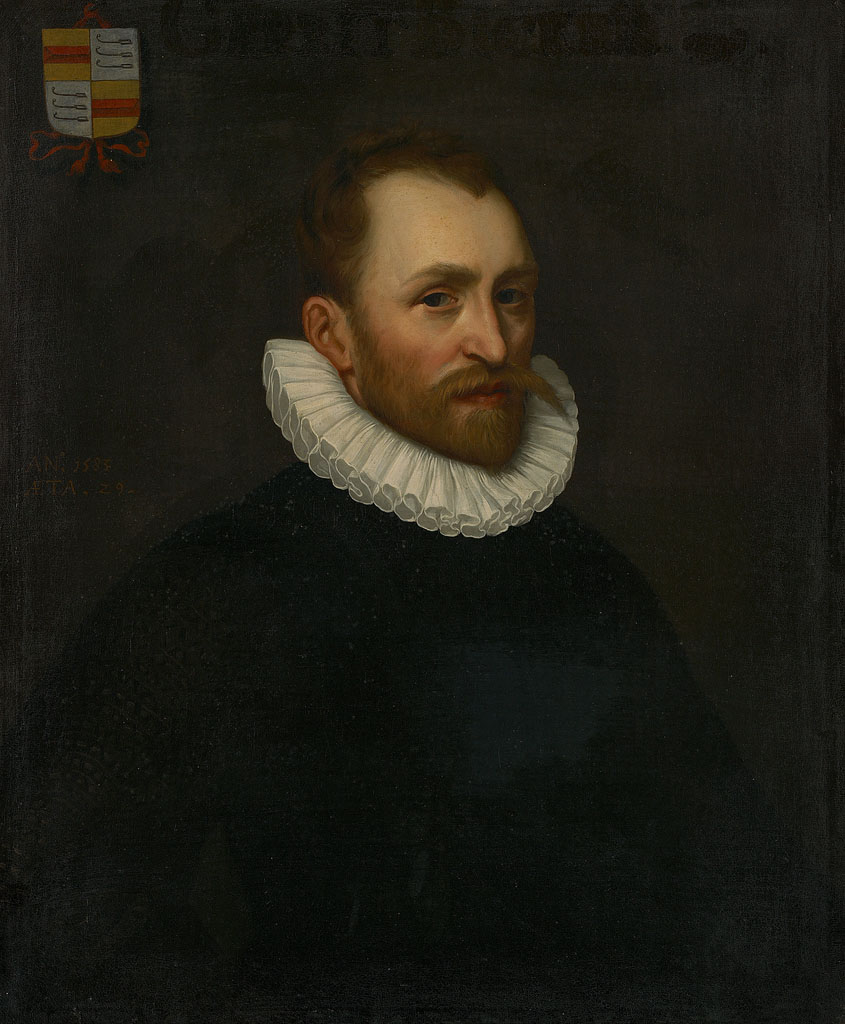
Gerrit Bicker by an anonymous Amsterdam artist, 1583.

Gerrit Pieter Bicker (1554–1604) was a Dutch merchant, patrician, and one of the founders of the Compagnie van Verre and its successor the Dutch East India Company.

== Family ==
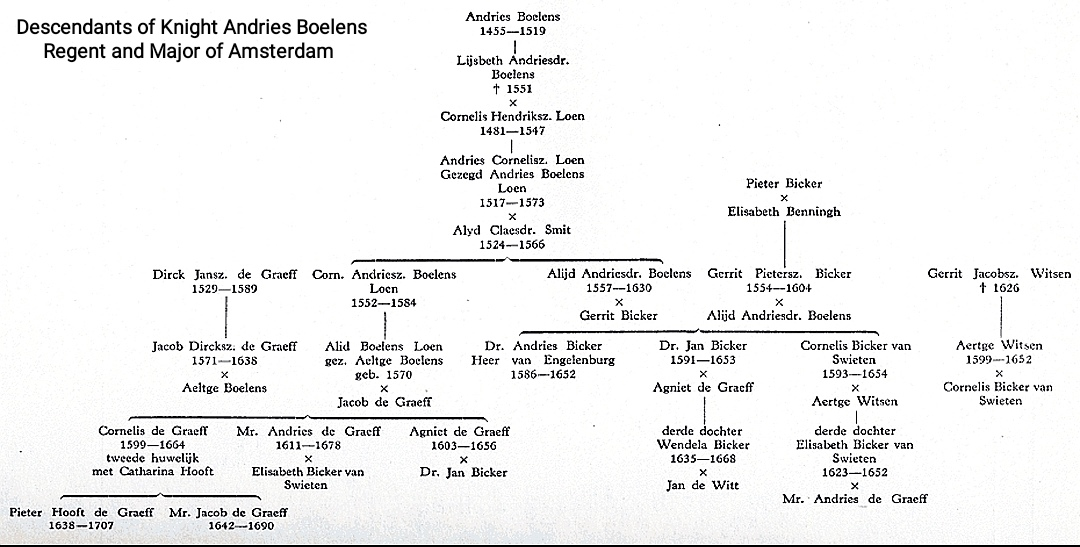
Overview of the personal family relationships of the Amsterdam oligarchy between the regent-dynasties Boelens Loen, De Graeff, Bicker (van Swieten), Witsen and Johan de Witt in the Dutch Golden Age

Born in Amsterdam, Gerrit Bicker was the son of Pieter Pietersz Bicker (1522–1585), a brewer and Amsterdam ambassador to Danzig, and Lijsbeth Benningh, Banninck (an ancestor of Frans Banninck Cocq). His brothers were Laurens Bicker, Jacob Bicker (1555–1587) and his sister was Dieuwer Jacobsdr Bicker (1584–1641). He belonged to the powerful Bicker family of regenten. In 1580 Gerrit Bicker married to Aleyd Andriesdr Boelens, descended from burgomaster Andries Boelens, making him brother in law to burgomaster Jan Claes Boelens. The couple had four children: Andries, Jacob, Jan and Cornelis Bicker.

== Life ==
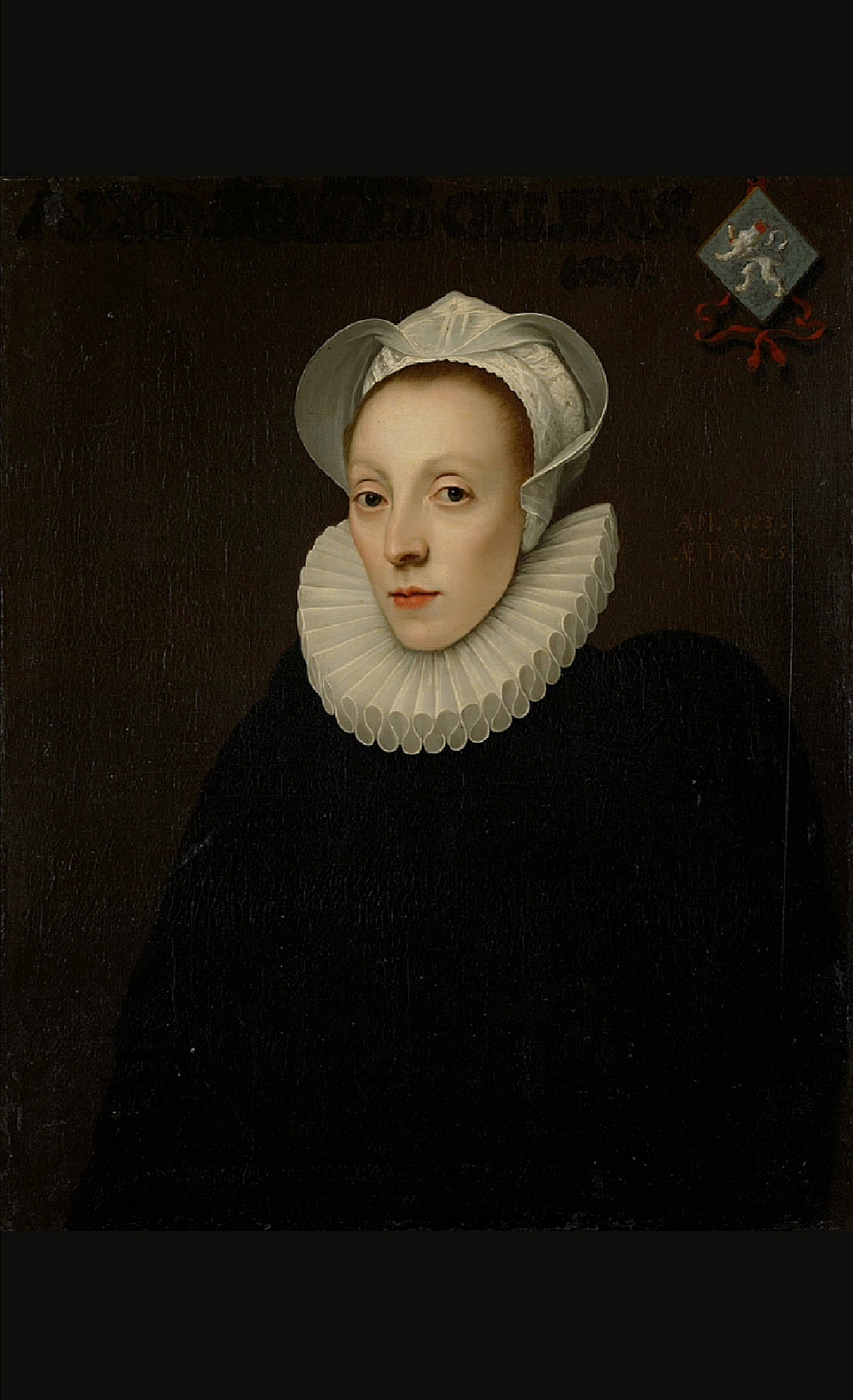
Alijda Andriesdr Boelens (Loen) (1557–1630), wife of Gerrit Bicker

In 1585 Bicker was one of the richest merchants in Amsterdam, initially living on the Oudezijds Achterburgwal and later on the Niezel. In 1590 he was elected to the town council and six years later he not only became one of the founding directors of the Compagnie van Verre but also invested in Uilenburg, whilst also involved in the sale of plots of land. In 1597 he and his brother Laurens established the Compagnie van Guinee to trade with Guinea and on the Río de la Plata in South America. In 1601 Gerard le Roy and Laurens Bicker led the twelfth Dutch expedition to the east Indies, paid for by the Vereenigde Zeeuwse Compagnie (United Zeeland Company), a 'voorcompagnie'.

In 1590 Bicker was appointed Schepen and member of the Vroedschap of Amsterdam. In 1600 he sold his father's brewery. In 1602 he became one of the first financial backers of the Dutch East India Company, contributing 21,000 guilders. He was also one of the first Dutch traders to trade with the White Sea. In 1603 he became burgomaster of Amsterdam. His son laid the foundation stone of the Zuiderkerk. In 1604 Gerrit Bicker was appointed 'ambachtsheer' of Amstelveen, Nieuwer-Amstel.

== Sources ==
- (in Dutch) Zandvliet, Kees, De 250 rijksten van de Gouden Eeuw. Kapitaal, macht, familie en levensstijl (2006 Amsterdam; Nieuw Amsterdam Uitgevers), 73
