= Cornelis Bicker =

Regent and mayor of Amsterdam (1586 – 1652)

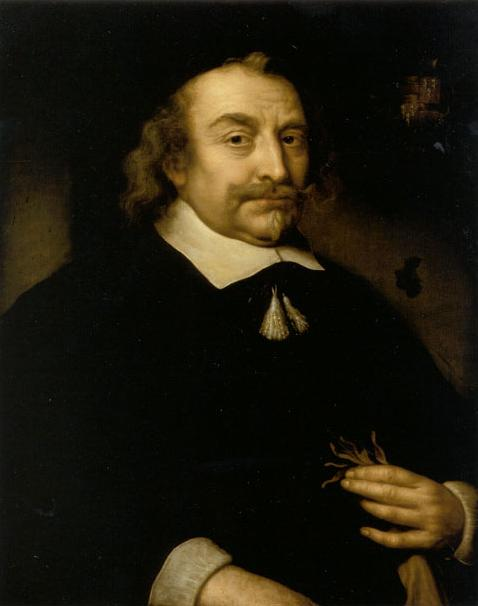
- Portrait by Govaert Flinck, 1654

Burgomaster of Amsterdam
- In office 1646, 1650, 1654
- Preceded by: Frans Banninck Cocq
- Succeeded by: Jan Bicker

Bewindhebber of the Dutch West India Company

Personal details
- Party: States Faction
- Spouse: Aleyd Boelens Loen
- Relations: Andries Bicker (brother); Jan Bicker (brother); Cornelis de Graeff (cousin); Andries de Graeff (cousin and son-in-law); Cornelis Geelvinck (son-in-law); Lambert Reynst (son-in-law); Johan de Witt (nephew)
- Children: 5, including Gerard
- Occupation: Burgomaster and Landlord
- Profession: Merchant

Cornelis Bicker van Swieten (25 October 1592 – 15 September 1654), heer (lord) van Swieten, was an Amsterdam regent of the Dutch Republic during the Golden Age. He traded in sugar, was a governor of the Dutch West India Company and director of the Wisselbank. As oneof the most influential members of the "Bickerse league" he became burgomaster and schepen of Amsterdam, hoogheemraad of the Hoogheemraadschap van Rijnland and a counsellor of the States of Holland and West Friesland at The Hague.

Cornelis Bicker, together with his brother Andries Bicker and his cousin Cornelis de Graeff, was one of the main initiators for a peace with Spain in the Eighty Years' War and for the participation of the Dutch provinces in the Peace of Münster.

== Life ==
Cornelis Bicker was the youngest son of Gerrit Bicker and Aleyd Andriesdr Boelens Loen. In 1617 Cornelis Bicker married Aertge Witsen (1599–1652)(1599–1652), daughter of merchant and burgomaster Gerrit Jacobsz Witsen. They had five children:

1. Margaretha Bicker van Swieten (1619–1697), ⚭ with Gerard van Hellemond and afterwards with Cornelis Geelvinck, burgomaster of Amsterdam
2. Alida Bicker van Swieten (1620–1702), ⚭ with Lambert Reynst, burgomaster of Amsterdam
3. Elisabeth Bicker van Swieten (1623–1656), ⚭ with her uncle and cousin Andries de Graeff, statesman, burgomaster of Amsterdam
4. Maria Bicker van Swieten (1629–1653), ⚭ with Gerbrand Ornia
5. Gerard Bicker (I) van Swieten (1632–1716), Rekenmeester van Holland en West-Friesland ⚭ married three times: I. with his grand cousin Alida van Papenbroek (1633–1656); II. with his cousin Cornelia Bicker (1638–1665); III. with Jkvr. Catherine van Sypesteyn (1629–1709).

=== Career ===
In 1617 Cornelis Bicker and his wife settled at Singel 130 in Amsterdam, in a canal house which his family sold in 1767. In 1622 he became bewindhebber of the Dutch West India Company and also held several directorships, such as of the Wisselbank from 1625-1633. He was one of the investors in draining the Bijlmer. In 1627 he chartered a ship on Arkhangelsk.

In 1632 he bought the Swieten estate and manorhouse from Hugo Cuyk van Mierop - from these he later derived his noble title. In 1634 he was appointed a captain in the schutterij (civic guard). In 1641 Jacob Bicker succeeded him at the Wisselbank. In 1628, 1635, 1637, 1638, 1642 he was appointed schepen.

Cornelis Bicker was member even of the "Bickerse league", which included his brothers Andries, Jacob, Jan, and their distant cousins, the brothers Roelof, Jacob and Hendrick Jacobsz Bicker. They opposed the stadtholder Frederick Henry, Prince of Orange, who intended the centralize the five admiralties, which would cause the Admiralty of Amsterdam to lose influence.

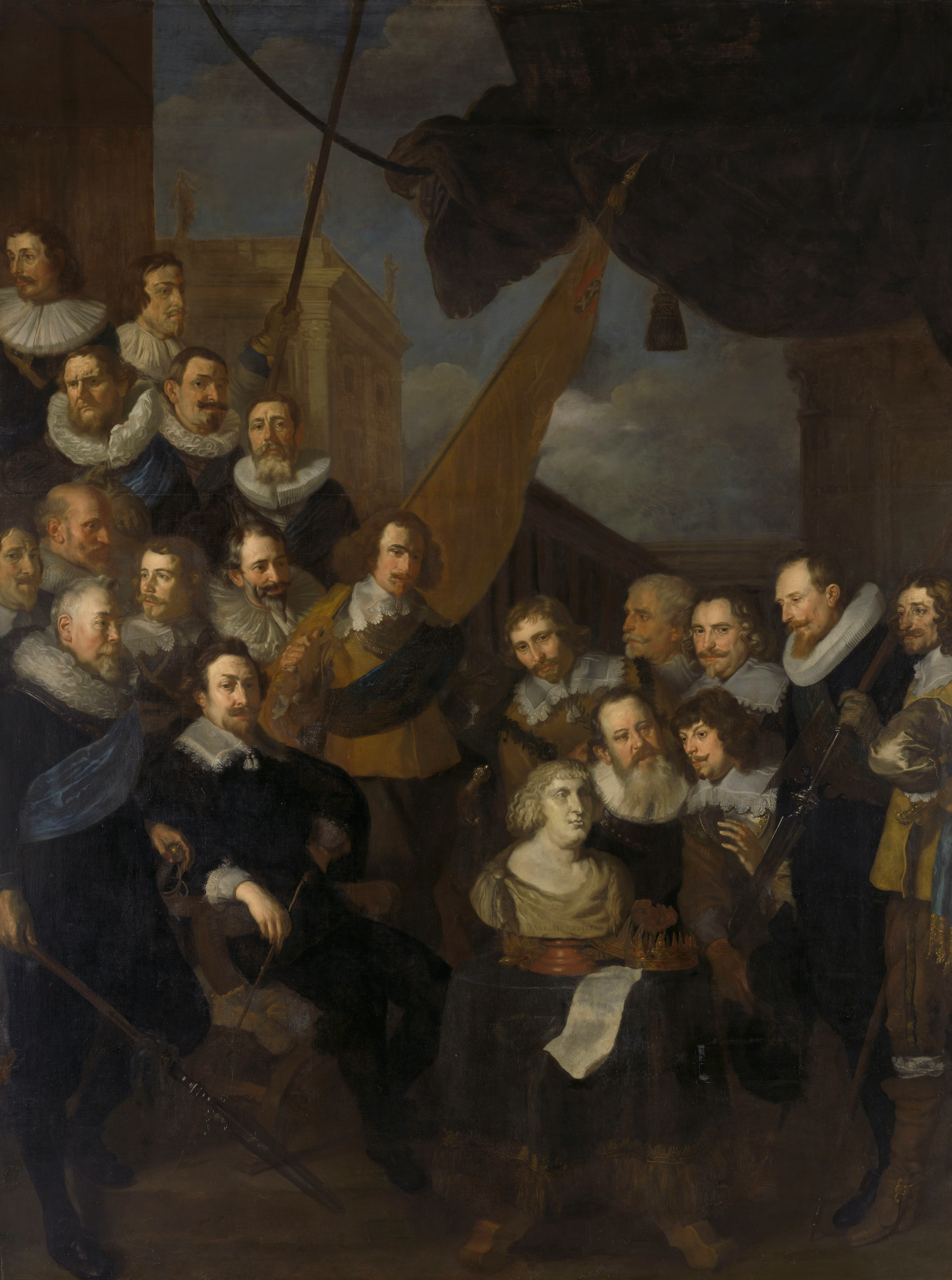
Officieren en andere schutters van wijk XIX in Amsterdam onder leiding van kapitein Cornelis Bicker en luitenant Frederick van Banchem, gereed voor de ontvangst van Maria de’ Medici, Rijksmuseum SK-C-393

During the 1640s, the republican elite of the province of Holland, the brothers Cornelis, Andries, Jacob and Jan Bicker, Jacob de Witt and the brothers Andries and Cornelis de Graeff advocated an end to the Eighty Years' War with the Kingdom of Spain and a reduction in land forces. This ongoing state of war prevented the economic growth and social development of the Republic of the United Netherlands. Also, this state of war strengthened the atadtholder's power as commander-in-chief of the armed forces, something the Republicans did not want. This intensified the conflict between them and the stadtholder Frederick Henry of Orange and the Reformed Hollands.

In 1647 he became a deputy for East Friesland at the States General. In February 1651 he was sent to the States of Holland for three years. He was burgomaster of Amsterdam in 1646, 1650 and 1654. Cornelis Bicker was buried in Amsterdam's Nieuwe Kerk. During the 1640s, the influence of Andries Bicker, his family and the city grew even greater as the end of the Eighty Years' War drew nearer. Amsterdam's trade interests pointed in the direction of peace and she was able to push through under Bicker's leadership. The position of the Bicker family was then more powerful than any generation of mayors before or after them. In 1648, due to the immense political pressure from the entire Bicker-De Graeff Clan the United Netherlands entered into peace negotiations with Spain in order to end the Eighty Years' War with the Peace of Münster.

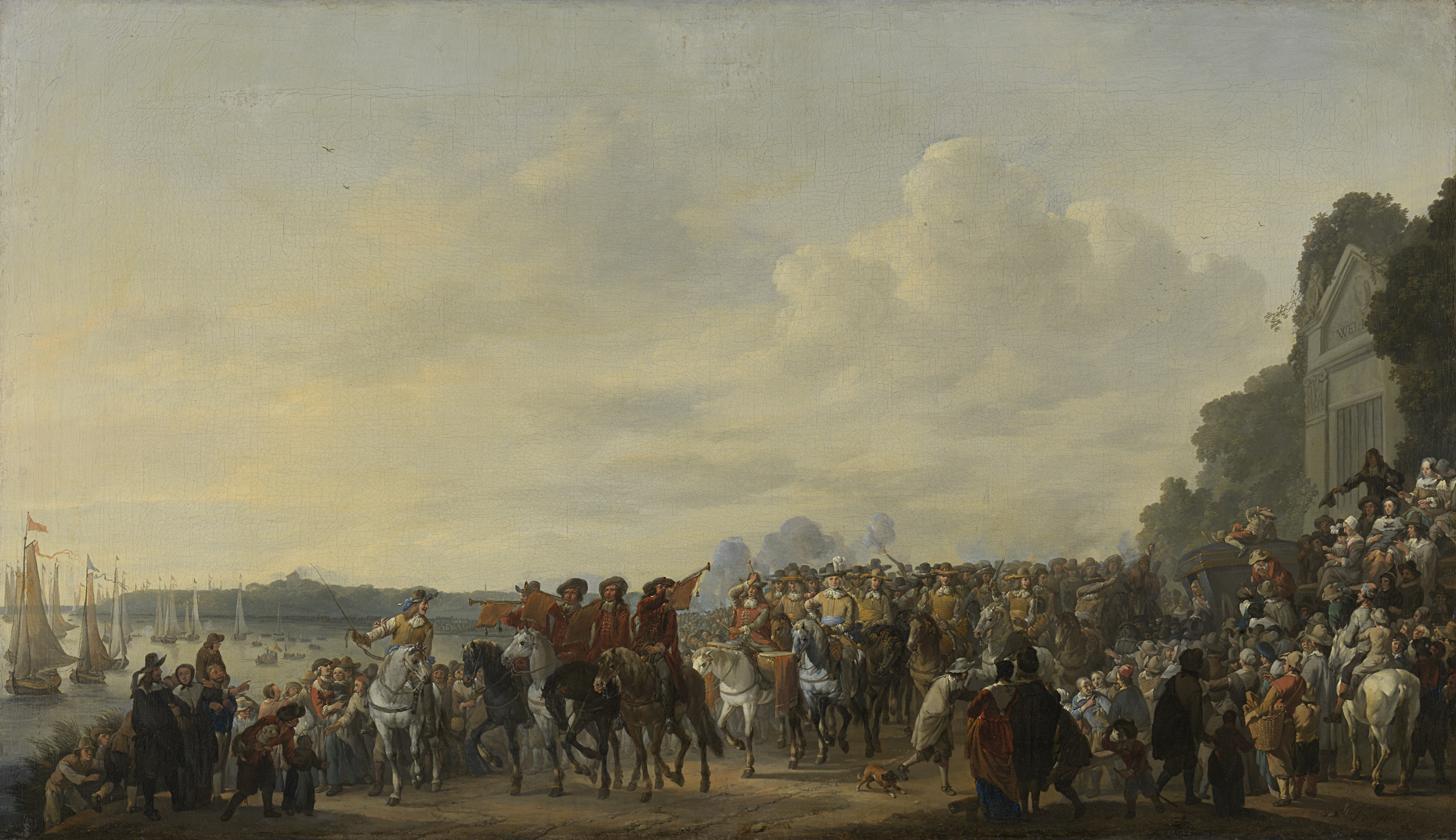
This painting possibly shows princely troops along the Amstel river near Welna estate during William II's attack on Amsterdam.

=== Attack on Amsterdam ===
After the peace treaties and the reduction of the land forces, the political opposition to the House of Orange and in particular to the new stadtholder William II, who wanted to make the city of Amsterdam docile in 1650 by means of a coup d'etat, deepened. In May 1650 he supported a proposal that suggested military cutbacks to encourage peace efforts. On 30 July 1650 the brothers Andries (old-burgomaster) and burgomaster Cornelis Bicker activated the militia to defend against an attack on Amsterdam by the new stadholder William II after being warned of William's approach by a postman travelling from Hamburg to Amsterdam, who passed on the news to Bicker's nephew (via his brother, the former burgomaster Andries) Gerard Bicker, then the bailiff or drost of Muiden. Gerard set off for Amsterdam immediately and after receiving the news Cornelis and Andries together with burgomaster Joan Huydecoper van Maarsseveen raised the bridges, shut the gates and deployed artillery. The attack failed but after the attack burgomaster Cornelis de Graeff passed on a message from William II that Cornelis and Andries must resign from their posts on the town council. However, they were restored to them on 22 November the same year afterwards William died shortly of smallpox.

=== Cornelis Bicker in art ===
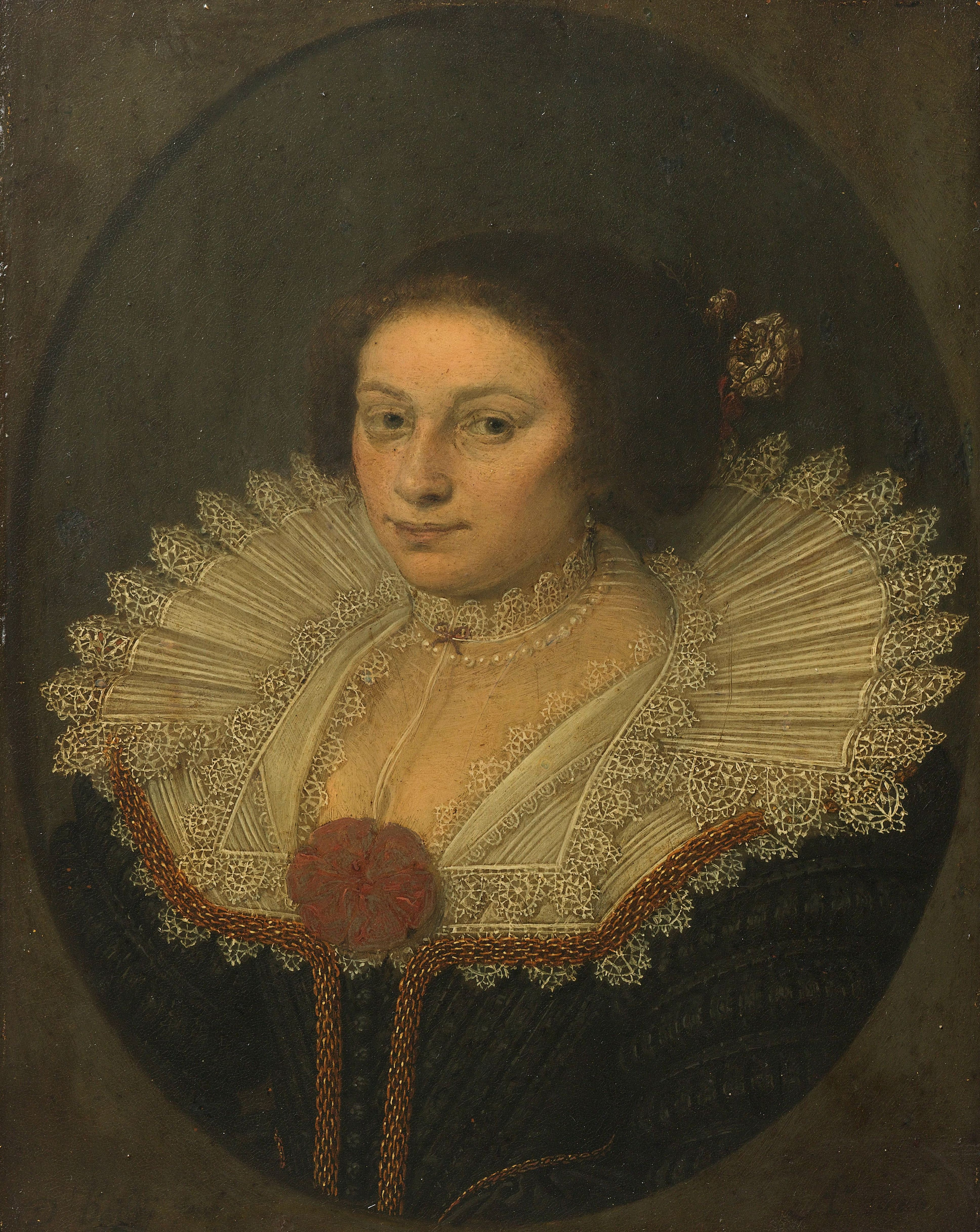
David Bailly's portrait of Aertge Witsen.

Bicker commissioned a large-format portrait of himself and his family from Cornelis van der Voort in 1618. Cornelis Bicker also appears as a captain in a 1638 militia group portrait by Joachim von Sandrart, commissioned by the Kloveniersdoelen to mark the visit of Maria de Medici and now in the Rijksmuseum in Amsterdam. Another painting of Blick dates to 1654 and is attributed to Govert Flinck - this work was praised by Vondel. His wife was also painted by David Bailly.

== Bicker family ==
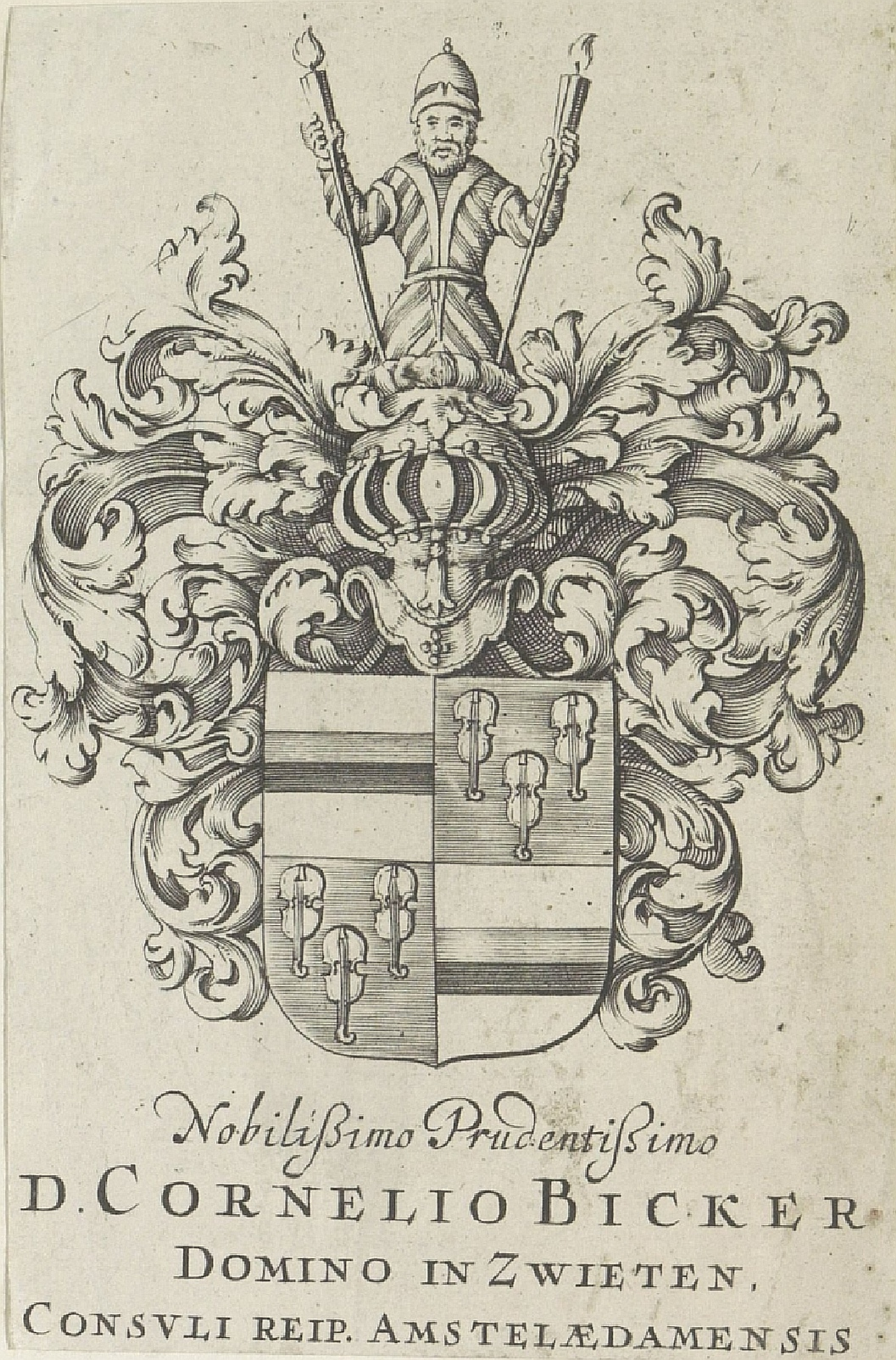
Coat of arms Cornelis Bicker

The Bicker family was one of the oldest patrician families of Amsterdam and belonged to the leading regent-oligarchy. The Bickers were the most powerful family in Amsterdam and decisively determined the fortunes of the city. They were a major trading family involved in the pelt trade with Muscovy and supplying ships and silver to Spain. Laurens Bicker was one of the first to trade on Guinea and seized four Portuguese ships in 1604. The Bicker-De Graeff family-faction became the strongest competitor in the years after the Dutch uprising. They controlled Amsterdam's city government and the province of Holland for half a century. Both families were powerful and influential between the earlier 17th century and the Rampjaar 1672 during the height of the Republic's power. Through their work on the Amsterdam City Council and the Dutch East India Company, the Bickers gained enormous influence on politico-economic self-determination in the young Dutch Republic due to the city's position of economic power within the Republic. Gerrit was a wealthy patrician, politician (burgomaster in 1603), international grain merchant and beer brewer. and threw his work in the Amsterdam Vroedschap and as one of the founders of the East India Company, he was able to launch the careers of his sons, grandchildren and nephews. Cornelis' oldest brother Andries Bicker ruled the city administration for a long time and was mainly supported and carried by him and their other two brothers Jacob and Jan Bicker, his uncle Jacob Dircksz de Graeff and his cousin Cornelis de Graeff. The Bicker brothers had a firm grip on world trade, trading on the East, the West, the North and the Mediterranean.

== Bibliography ==
- Matthias Laurenz Gräff: Cornelis Bicker van Swieten (1592-1654). Patriziatische Macht und Ohnmacht im Goldenen Zeitalter der Niederlande (2026)
- Jonathan I. Israel: The Dutch Republic: Its Rise, Greatness, and Fall: 1477-1806. Clarendon Press, Oxford 1995, ISBN 978-0-19-820734-4
- (in Dutch) Cornelis Bicker - Biography on DBNL
- (in Dutch) Kernkamp, G.W. (1977) Prins Willem II 1626-1650
- (in Dutch) P. Burke: Venetië en Amsterdam. Een onderzoek naar de elites in de zestiende eeuw. 1974
- (in Dutch) J.E. Elias, De Vroedschap van Amsterdam 1578-1795, deel 1 (Haarlem 1903), p. 175
- (in Dutch) Zandvliet, Kees De 250 rijksten van de Gouden Eeuw - Kapitaal, macht, familie en levensstijl (2006 Amsterdam; Nieuw Amsterdam Uitgevers)
