= Andries Bicker =

Regent and mayor of Amsterdam (1586–1652)

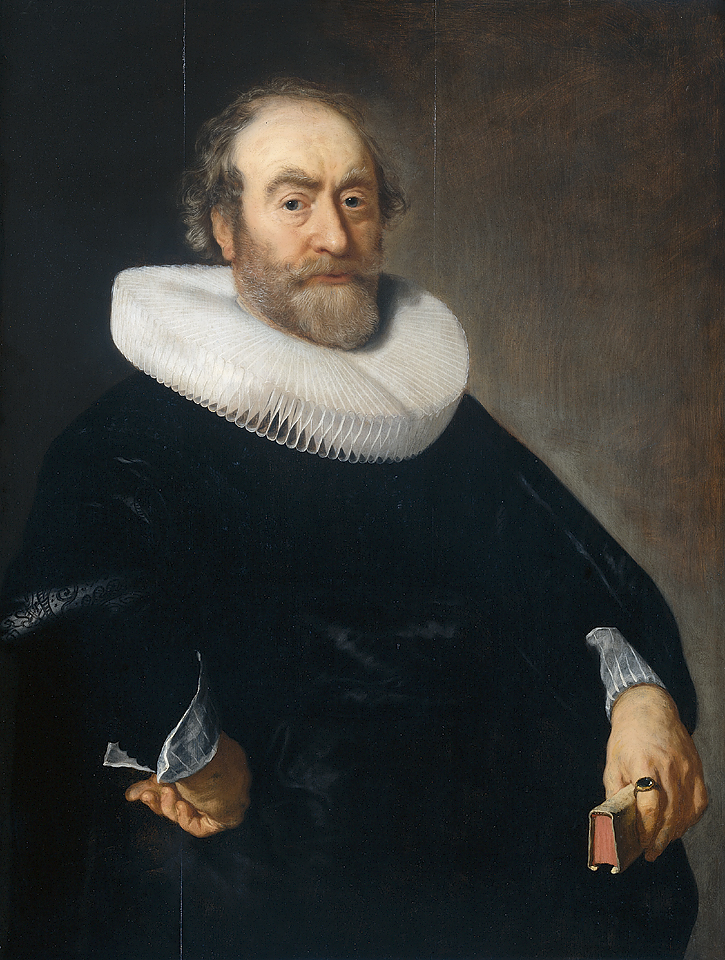
- Portrait by Bartholomeus van der Helst, 1642

Regent and Mayor of Amsterdam
- In office 1627–1649
- Preceded by: Jacob Dircksz de Graeff
- Succeeded by: Cornelis de Graeff

Personal details
- Party: States Faction
- Spouse: Catharina Gansneb von Tengnagel
- Relations: Jacob Bicker (brother); Jan Bicker (brother); Cornelis Bicker (brother); Dieuwertje Bicker (older sister)
- Occupation: Regent / Mayor and Landlord of Amstelveen, Nieuwer-Amstel, Sloten, Sloterdijk, Osdorp, and Engelenburg
- Profession: merchant, politician

Andries Bicker (14 September 1586 – 24 June 1652) was a prominent burgomaster (mayor) of Amsterdam, politician and diplomat in the Dutch Republic. He belonged to the Bicker family, who, together with the related De Graeff family, ruled the city of Amsterdam and thus the province of Holland for about half a century. At that time, the Republic was at the height of its power.

At the end of the Twelve Years' Truce he became a member of the city council and the leader of the Bickerse faction, after Reynier Pauw's political end in 1620. Then the management of the Amsterdam city council fell into the hands of the tolerant Bicker and his uncle Jacob Dircksz de Graeff. This also gave new impetus to the republican States faction, which had been weakened since the assassination of Land's Advocate Johan van Oldenbarnevelt.

Andries Bicker, the leader of the so called "Bickerse league", was considered one of the strongest political adversaries of Frederick Henry, Prince of Orange, and controlled Dutch foreign policy. He, together with his brother Cornelis Bicker and cousin Cornelis de Graeff, portrayed as Bicker-De Graeff clan, was one of the main initiators of Peace of Münster effectively bringing an end to the Eighty Years' War.

== Political career ==
=== Beginning ===
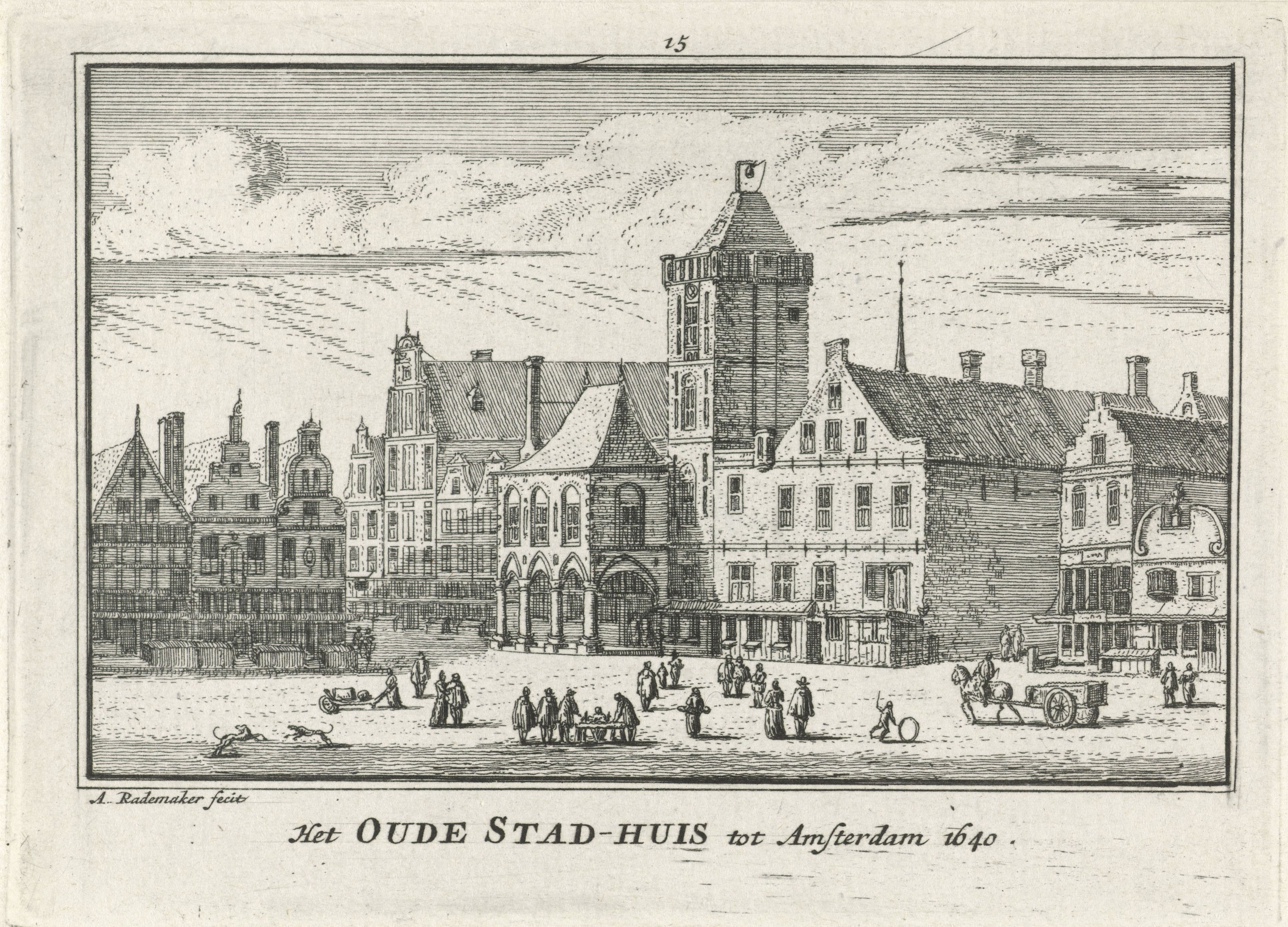
View on the old town hall in Amsterdam, 1640. The mayors seated in the tower.

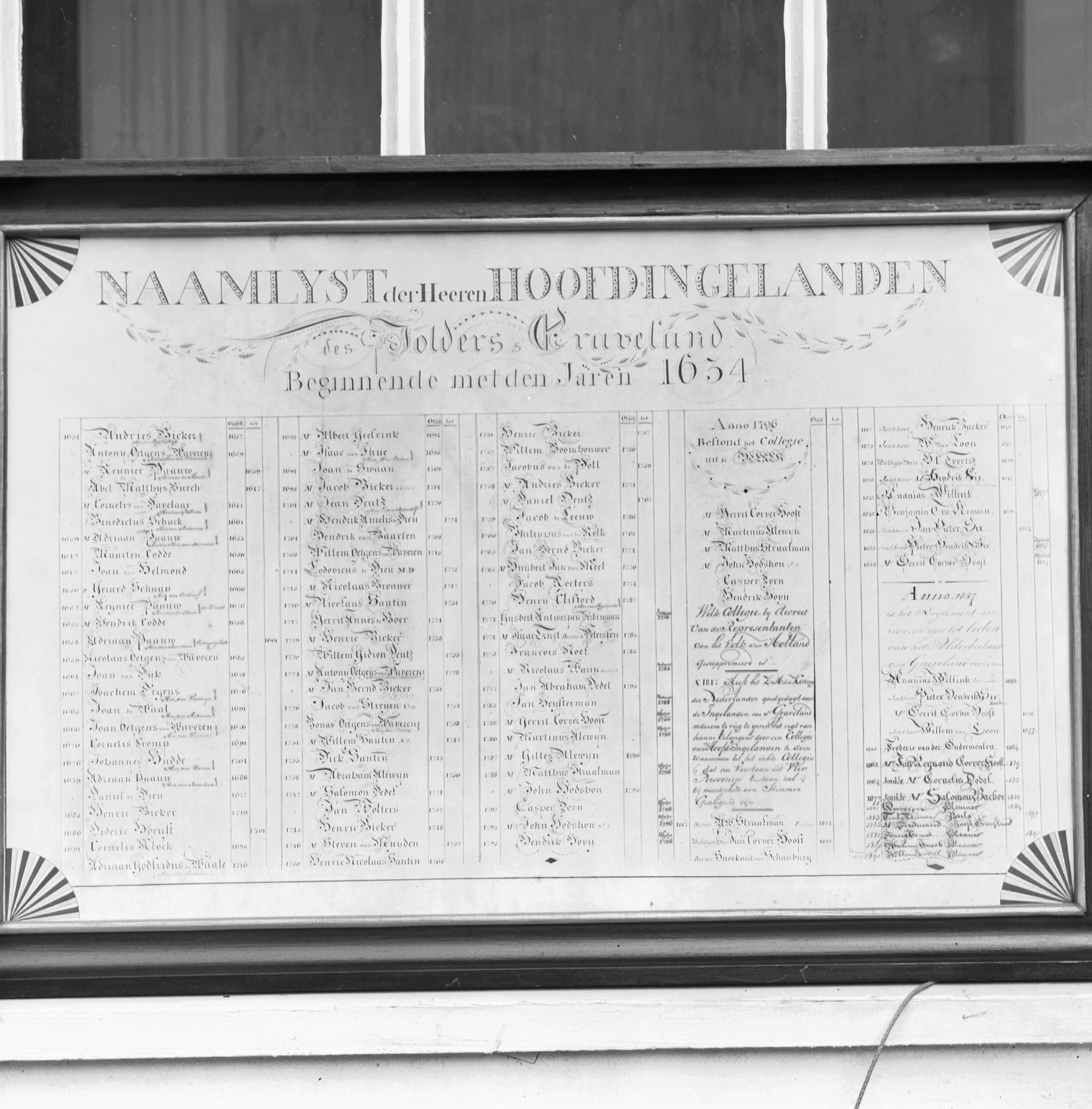
Naamlijst hoofdingelanden 1634–1891 in raadszaal 's-Graveland

Andries Bicker grew up at Lange Niezel. His father Gerrit Bicker owned a brewery at Grimburgwal and was one of the founders of the Dutch East India Company. Andries studied in Leiden starting in 1604 and seems to have made a Grand Tour; in 1610 he was in Poitiers. In 1611 he was admitted at Hof van Holland as a lawyer. In 1616 he became a member of the Amsterdam vroedschap and represented the States faction. In 1620 he was appointed schepen. Like his father he invested in draining the polders Purmer, Schermer and Heerhugowaard. In 1624, on behalf of the city, he was appointed landlord of Amstelveen en Nieuwer-Amstel. As manager at the Wisselbank (for just one year) he visited Emden, requesting a loan. (Note: Emden is the city where several of his relatives lived in the early stages of the Dutch revolt.) In 1626 he became colonel in the civic guard. In January 1627, reaching forty years old, he was elected mayor of Amsterdam. Bicker came to the fore through his knowledge and moderation. Although he belonged to the Calvinist church, as liberal Protestant he protected Arminians and Remonstrants. (Note: His further appointments fell in the years 1629, 1631, 1633, 1634, 1636, 1640, 1641, 1645 and 1649.)

In May 1627 Bicker was sent by the States-General as an ambassador to Danzig, Elbing and Königsberg to represent Dutch commercial interests and close negotiations between Poland, Sweden and Brandenburg. The Dutch diplomats were visited by Axel Oxenstierna, Governor-General in Riga but refused Gustavus Adolphus further monetary aid and demanded peace with Poland. The prolonged Polish-Swedish War caused great financial losses to Dutch merchants in the Baltic region. In June 1628 Bicker returned without having achieved anything.

=== Bickerse league ===
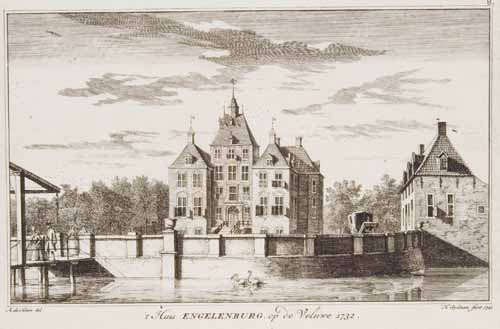
In 1647, he inherited from his brother Jacob Engelenburg castle near Herwijnen.

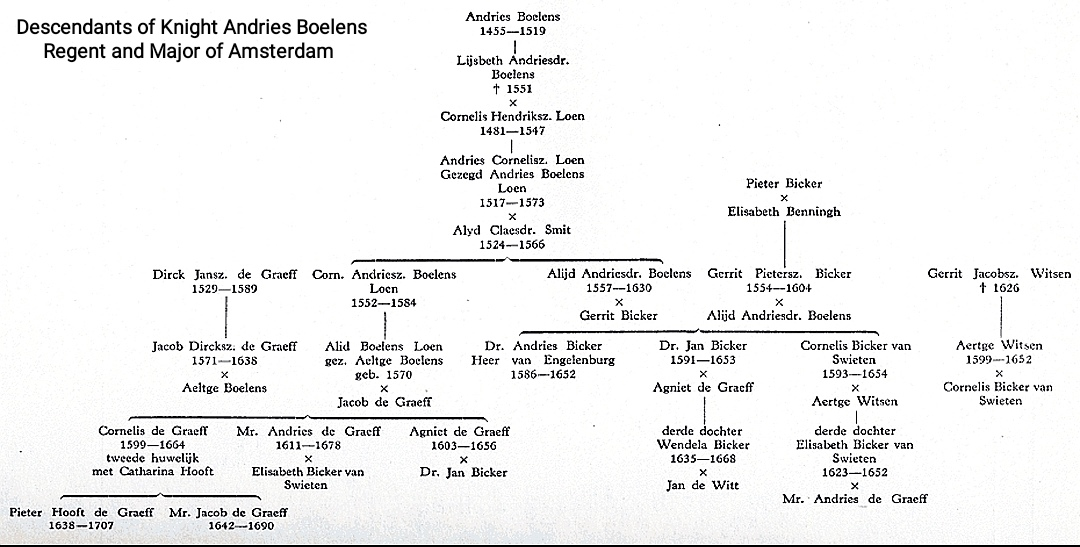
Descendants of Andries Boelens. Overview of the personal family relationships of the Amsterdam oligarchy between the regent-dynasties Boelens Loen, De Graeff, Bicker (van Swieten), Witsen and Johan de Witt.

In the 1630s, Bicker ruled the city together with his uncle Jacob Dircksz de Graeff portrayed as the arminian clique, helping the Republicans regain influence and recognition for the first time since Johan van Oldenbarnevelt's beheading. Bicker and De Graeff shared a liberal attitude that set them apart from strict Calvinist politicians. In 1628, Andries Bicker supported a call for more tolerance towards the Remonstrants, just like Geurt van Beuningen. In 1632 both were appointed to represent the city in the church councils.

The Bicker family, the so called "Bickerse league", focused on Amsterdam's economic boom. From 1625 Cornelis Bicker was connected to the Wisselbank. Jacob Bicker became one of the managers of the VOC. Jan Bicker, a contractor bought Bickerseiland in January 1631. The Bicker family participated in peat-digging in Drenthe and disagreed with Adriaan Pauw. In 1634 Bicker became the owner of five plots with a depth of ca 1,100m in 's-Graveland, the site where now Spanderswoud and Trompenburgh are located. Ships transported the excavated sand to Amsterdam using the Weespertrekvaart.

In 1635 he went on a diplomatic mission to Poland and Sweden. They reached an extension of the expiring armistice between Poland and Sweden in the Treaty of Stuhmsdorf and set up new Baltic trade agreements. He became involved in the discussions around postponing the Gijsbrecht van Aemstel (play). At the solemn entry of Maria de Medici into Amsterdam in September 1638, he, his brother Jacob and other regents, (Note: Albert Burgh, Pieter Hasselaer, Antonie Oetgens van Waveren and Abraham Boom) welcomed her. Jan Bicker supplied ships of war to France (Cardinal Richelieu) around 1638. (Note: Together with mayor Abraham Boom)

Between 1637 and 1639 Andries was councilor of the Admiralty of Amsterdam. He opposed stadtholder Frederick Henry, who intended the centralize the five admiralties, which would cause the Admiralty to lose influence. Bicker faced accusations involving private affairs, allegedly including monopolizing the fur and pepper trade. Though, there is no evidence that he ever traded on Russia. Johan Elias claimed he served as a manager of the VOC in 1641, though there is confusion with Jacob Bicker, who also assumed a position at the Wisselbank. In February 1643 Andries was tasked with representing the city in the States of Holland in The Hague.

In July 1644, the States of Holland sent Bicker and Jacob de Witt as envoy to Christian IV of Denmark and Axel Oxenstierna to mediate between Sweden and Denmark. Bicker and a son first stayed in Copenhagen and then went to Stockholm. In December they returned for consultation while the negotiations were prolonged. The end of the Torstenson War rested on the power of the Dutch naval dominance by Admiral Witte de With who arrived in the Sound in July 1645 to support a free passage. After the Treaty of Brömsebro in Blekinge, Sweden had unrestricted access to the North Sea and was no longer encircled by Denmark–Norway.

Engraving of the townhall (1650) based on a design by Jacob van Campen

During the 1640s the republican elite of the province of Holland, the brothers Andries and Cornelis Bicker, their cousins Cornelis and Andries de Graeff and Jacob de Witt, advocated an end to the war with Spain and a reduction in land forces. This ongoing state of war prevented the economic growth and social development in Holland. Also, this state of war strengthened the stadtholder's power as commander-in-chief, something the Republicans did not want.

Around 1646 the Bickerse league comprised seven members of the Bicker family, all of whom held political offices in those years. It included his brothers Jan, Jacob and Cornelis Bicker, as well their cousins, Jacob Jacobsz Bicker (1612–1676), Hendrick Jacobsz Bicker (1615–1651) and Roelof Jacobsz Bicker (1611-1656). Between 1646 and 1648 Bicker was deputy to the States General. Bicker was involved in the preparations for an extended town hall and a reorganisation of the VOC and WIC.

=== Peace of Münster ===
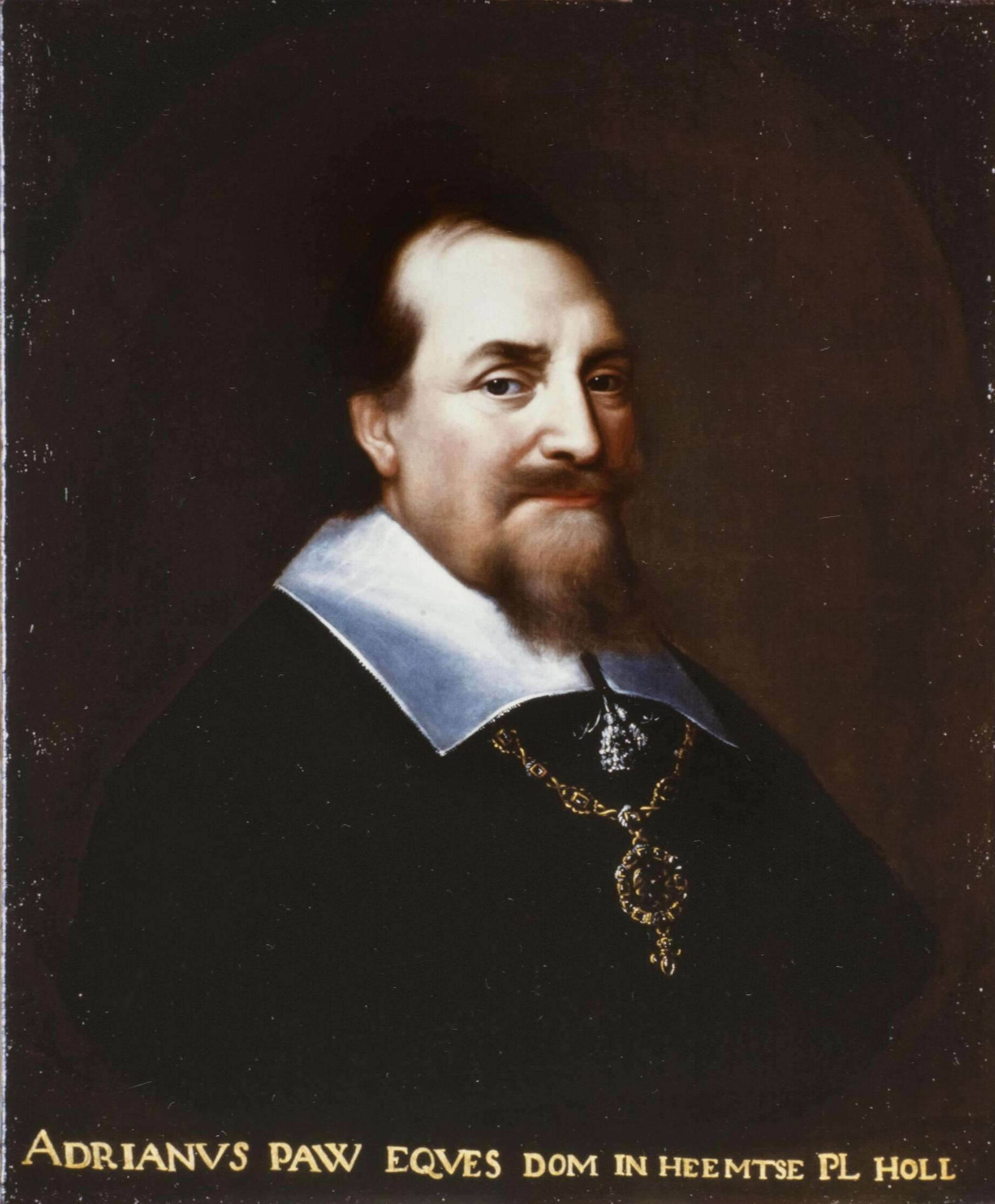
Adriaan Pauw (1585–1653)

On 30 January 1646, Adriaan Pauw and Johan de Knuyt reached an armistice for twenty years and recognition of State sovereignty in Munster. The siege of Antwerp took place in 1646. In 1646 Jacob Bicker (?) made a deal to transport silver from Cádiz to the Spanish Netherlands so Spanish soldiers could be paid. On 8 January 1647, a provisional peace agreement was reached, recognizing the status quo in the East and West Indies, as well as the patents of the Dutch East and West India Company. In particular, Holland was in favor of concluding a peace. This had everything to do with money. Holland had to raise most of the costs of the war. In addition, it was considered in this region that a peace could have a beneficial influence on Dutch trade. In March Frederick Henry died; Andries Bicker, Adriaan Pauw, Cornelis de Graeff and the inner power circle of the States of Holland advocated a drastic reduction of 6,000 mercenaries. Bicker dealt with Amalia von Solms and the corrupt Cornelis Musch.

On 8 July 1647 the way had been cleared for a separate peace with Spain. The Spanish government made a proposal aimed at making Amsterdam the staple market for Spanish silver. Spain seems to have bankrupt and England involved in a civil war. In October the States General decided to authorize the admiralties to issue passports to the skippers for the export of silver from Spain; Bicker was involved in the request, so Dutch soldiers could be paid. In 1648 Bicker was sent to Middelburg which did not support the peace negotiations. The United Provinces desired peace: they would rather have weak Spain as a neighbor than a growing France.

The Dutch were allowed to trade on any Spanish port. After the Treaty, a lot of silver from Cádiz (and Potosí) was received by the Wisselbank, transported by Joan and Balthasar Coymans. Amsterdam became a recognized staple market for Spanish silver from the New World.

In 1649 Andries Bicker promoted not to go to war with Portugal so that trade with Africa became possible again. Amsterdam's government resisted further financial support for the struggling West India Company and opposed its commercial monopoly. This position brought the Bicker brothers into conflict with Zeeland, which favoured military action against Portugal to preserve the company's possessions in Dutch Brazil.

The Bicker family had initially supported the WIC, but sold its shares in 1629 and subsequently competed with the company in trade with Dutch Brazil. Amsterdam's government increasingly favoured free trade over the company's monopoly, including in the Atlantic slave trade.

=== Conflict with William II of Orange ===
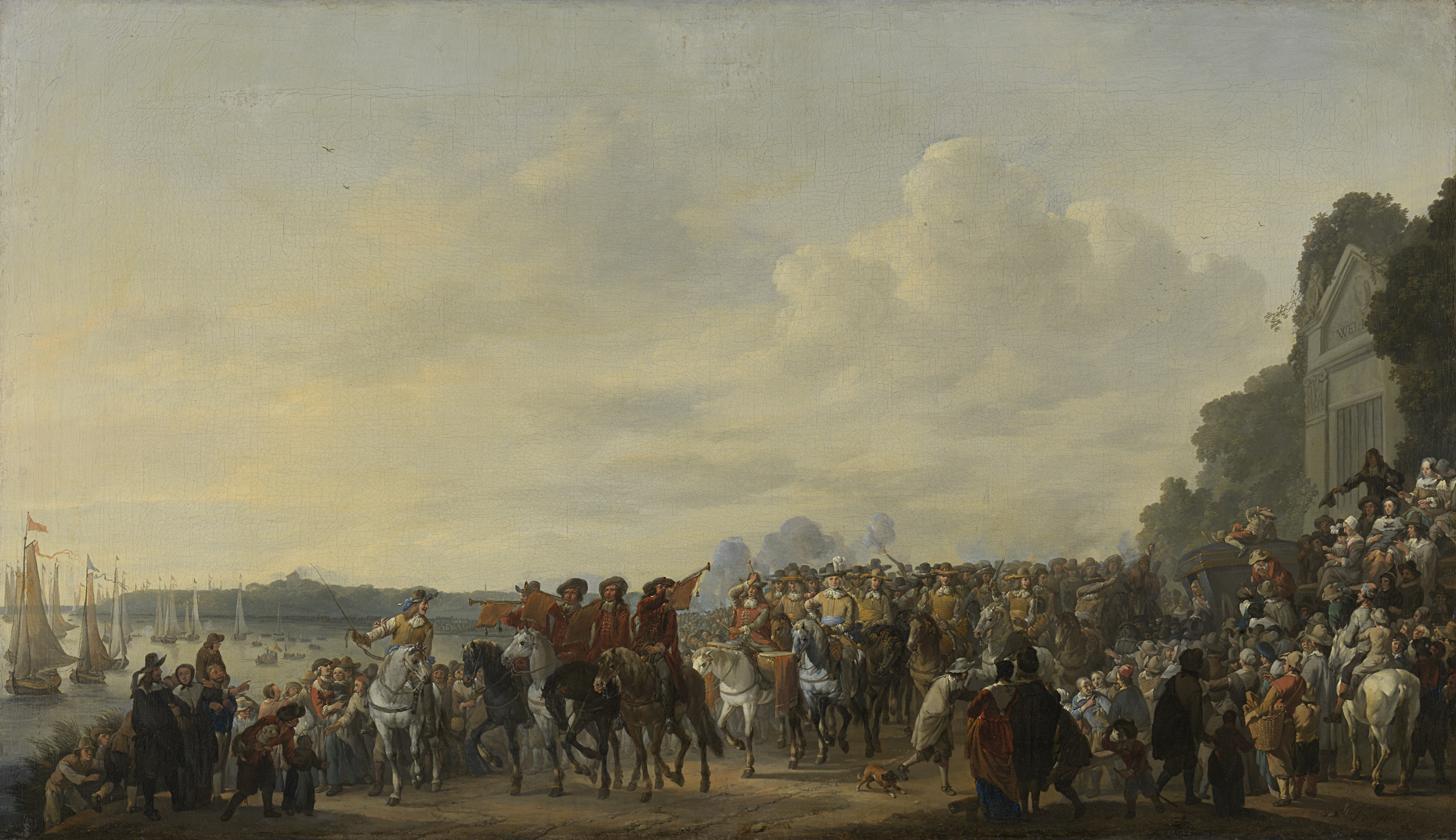
This painting shows princely troops (2,000 men) led by William Frederick, Prince of Nassau-Dietz and Frederick, Burgrave of Dohna along the Amstel river at the Welna estate, (today Utrechtse brug) headquarters during the attack on Amsterdam.

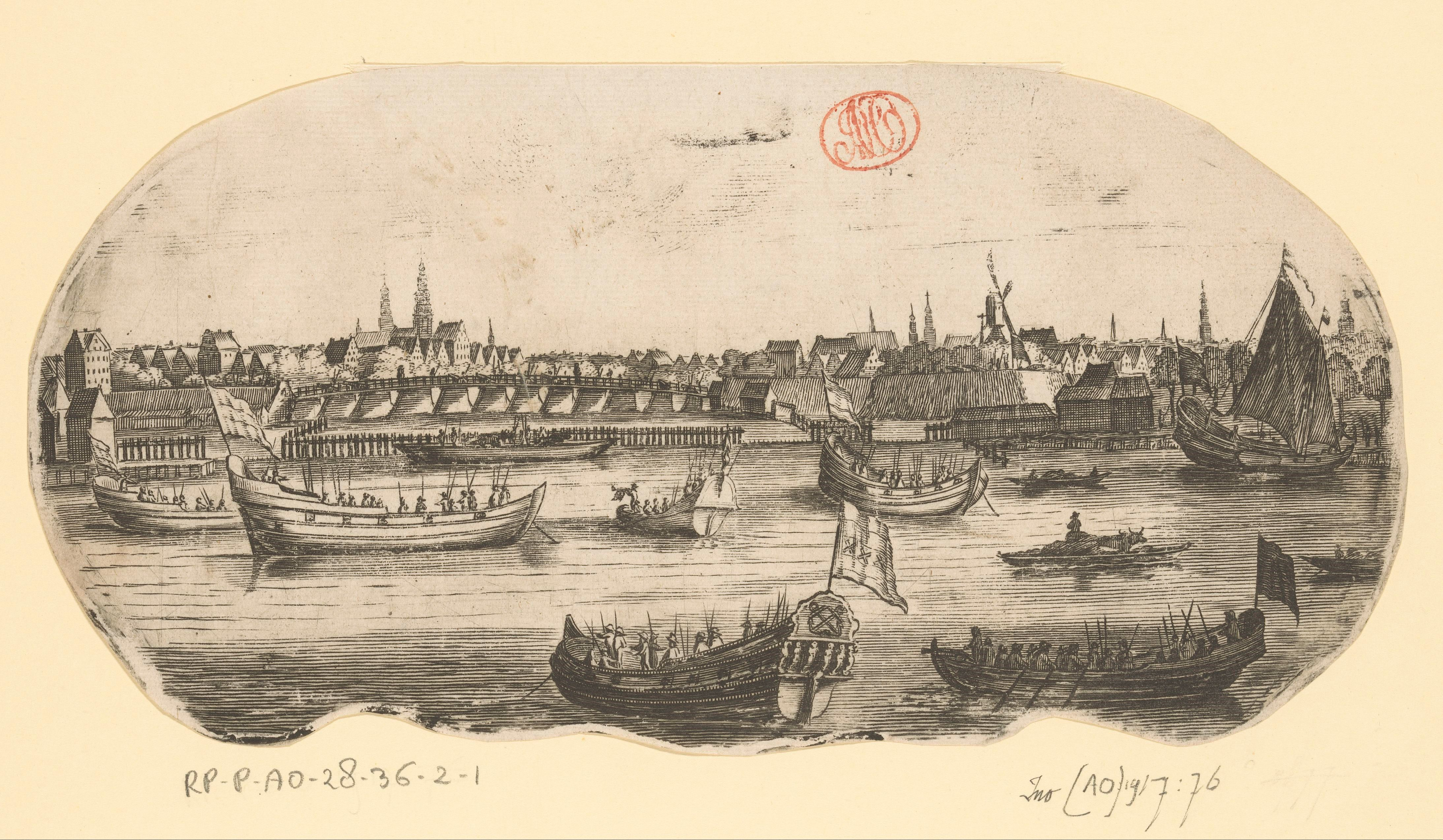
Boats with soldiers on the Amstel river (1650)

In February 1650, Andries, still colonel in the civic guard, was elected councilor of the Admiralty of Amsterdam. The stadtholder, who wielded a decisive influence over appointments in the Seven United Provinces, much to the chagrin of the Republicans, seems to have disagreed. In May, Andries supported strong military cutbacks. In an anonymous libel he was accused of Spanish arms trade, peace policy, and alleged sovereignty ambitions. Following the treaties and the downsizing of land forces, the youthful stadtholder William II sought to assert control over Amsterdam and devised plans for an unlawful attack on the city.

On Saturday 30 July 1650, Andries and Cornelis Bicker ordered the civic guard to defend the city against an attack on Amsterdam. They were warned of the approach by Bicker's troubled son Gerard, then bailiff of Gooi. The next day they ordered to raise the bridges, shut the gates and deploy artillery. The attack, a show of force, failed but in the negotiations with the clique around the pragmatic Cornelis de Graeff the stadtholder insisted that Andries and Cornelis Bicker resign from their posts. As result Andries was purged from the vroedschap, as well as his brother Cornelis as one of the mayors. However, two weeks after William II died of smallpox they were restored in their functions; next February Cornelis was sent to the States of Holland for three years.

During the conflict with William II in 1650, an anonymous pamphlet accused Bicker and Anthonie Oetgens van Waveren of favouring Spain, obstructing the West India Company, and undermining the interests of the Dutch Republic.

Many times Andries Bicker interfered with the appointment of ministers, according to his handwritten collection of resolutions (Recueil). In 1652 Andries was appointed deputy to the Chambre Mi-partie, solving remaining problems between Spain and the Netherlands. On 11 May, he requested his discharge from this function; Andries Bicker died on 24 June and was buried two days later in the Oude Kerk, Amsterdam.

=== Outlook ===
In 1653 his brother Jan became mayor but died within a few months. Although not direct descendants, in 1655, his cousin Wendela Bicker married Grand Pensionary Johan de Witt, whose dominance in Dutch politics persisted until the Year of Disaster. Hendrik Bicker (1649–1718) and Hendrick Bicker (1682–1738) were mayors. Hendric (1722–1783) and Jan Bernd Bicker (II) (1733–1774) were managers of Andries Pels & Soonen. Jan Bernd Bicker was schepen who gave up his position at the bank, dissolved in 1774. The Bickers' estate was separated in 1792.

== Family ==
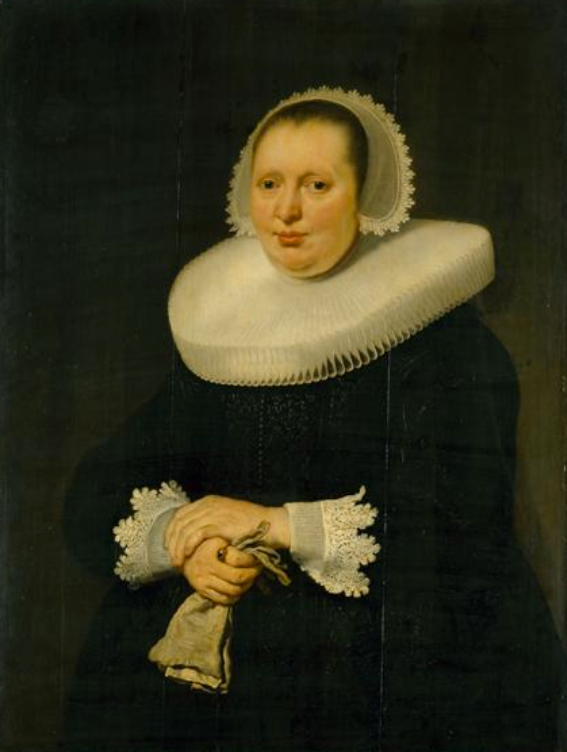
Portrait of Catharina Jansdr. Tengnagel, wife of Andries Bicker, by Bartholomeus van der Helst

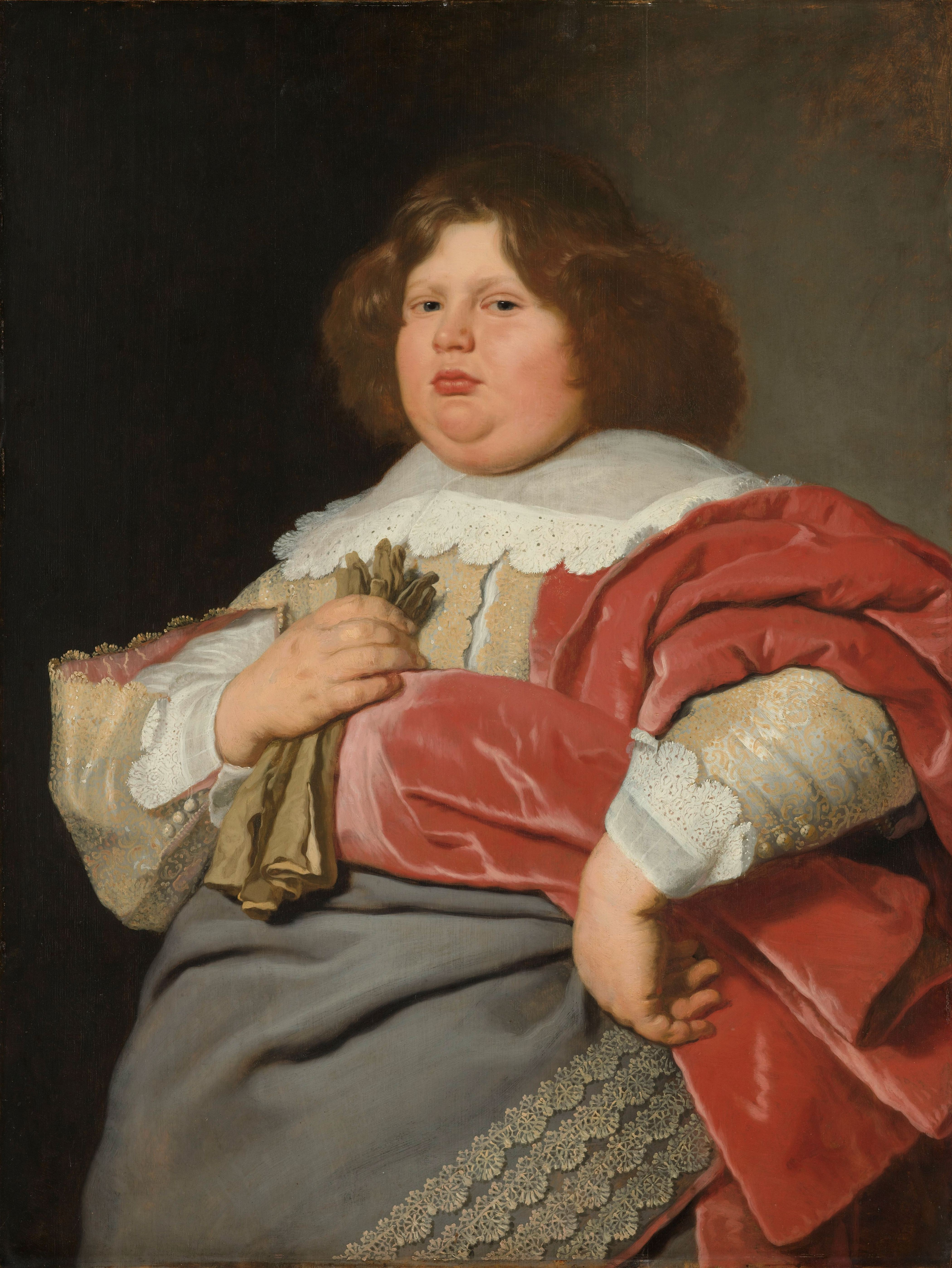
Gerard Andriesz Bicker by Bartholomeus van der Helst

Andries Bicker was married to Trijn Jansdr van Tengnagel (1595–1652). The couple lived near Oudemanhuispoort and had eleven children, all were baptized in the Oude or Nieuwe Kerk. Five survived childhood:

- Alida Bicker (1620–1702) was married to her cousin major Jacob Bicker (1612–1676), who inherited Engelenburg after the death of his brother-in-law. Their daughter, Catharina Bicker (1642–1678), was married to the Danish Count palatine Jacob de Petersen, the owner of "Boekesteyn".
- Gerard Bicker (1622–1666) was baljuw of Gooi, living at Muiden Castle from 1649. He inherited the estate Engelenburg and the title after the death of his father. In 1656, he married Alida Conings against the will of his father.
- Mr Jan Bicker (1626–1657), obese like his brother, met with Christina, Queen of Sweden, joining his father on his trip to Denmark and Sweden in 1644. In 1655 he became member of the vroedschap and councilor of the Admiralty of the Noorderkwartier; he remained unmarried.
- Cornelia Bicker (1629–1708), who inherited "Spanderswoud", was married to the Danish baron Joachim Irgens von Westervick in 1656. Irgens owned the Norwegian Irgens Estate, which was huge part of Northern Norway, but went broke.
- Elisabeth Bicker (1631–1666) was married to Salomon Sweers, a bookkeeper of the VOC.

=== Bicker family ===
The Bicker family, renowned as one of Amsterdam's oldest patrician lineages, occupied a prominent position within the city's ruling oligarchy. As the most influential family in Amsterdam, the Bickers played a pivotal role in shaping the city's destiny. Engaged in extensive trade, they actively supported the establishment of the East and West India Companies, with Jacob and Cornelis Bicker serving on their boards. Andries Bicker nevertheless remained a director of the Dutch East India Company from 1641 until his death in 1652.

Leveraging their involvement in the Amsterdam City Council, the Wisselbank, and the East- and West India Companies, the Bickers wielded significant influence over the socio-economic trajectory of the Dutch Republic, leveraging Amsterdam's status as a hub of economic power within the nation. With a stronghold on global commerce spanning the East, West, North, and Mediterranean, the Bicker brothers exerted formidable control over international trade routes.
