= Jacob Bicker =

Dutch patrician and merchant (1588-1646)

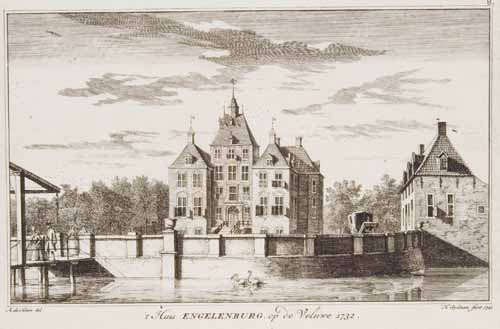
Engelenburg in 1732

Jacob Bicker (Amsterdam 1588–July 1646) was a Dutch patrician and merchant. He was a director of the Oostzeevaart, handling grain trade with Riga, since 1618 and a manager of the Dutch East India Company and between 1641-1646 manager of the Wisselbank.

== Life ==
Jacob Bicker was a son of Gerrit Bicker and Aleyd Andriesdr Boelens Loen. Jacob's oldest brother Andries Bicker ruled the city administration for a long time and was mainly supported and carried by him and their other two brothers Cornelis and Jan Bicker, his uncle Jacob Dircksz de Graeff and his cousin Cornelis de Graeff. The Bicker brothers had a firm grip on world trade, trading on the East, the West, the North and the Mediterranean.

Jacob Bicker married his cousin Christina de Graeff (1609–1679), daughter of Jacob Dircksz de Graeff and of Aaltje Boelens Loen. The couple seem to have lived at Fluwelenburgwal and had no children; in 1648 she married Pieter Trip. She was one of the richest people of the Dutch Golden Age.

=== Career ===
Jacob Bicker was estimated to have a fortune of 220,000 guilders in 1631. In 1643 Jacob Bicker inherited the castle and estate of Engelenburg near Herwijnen from his relative Pieter Dircksz Graeff. In the 1640s Jacob Bicker belonged to the Bickerse ligue, which opposed Stadholder Frederick Henry, Prince of Orange. Among his other posts, he held that of schepen; from 1641 he joined the Wisselbank. He lived in the parental house at Lange Niezel. In July 1646 he died and was buried nearby in the Oude Kerk, Amsterdam.

Bicker owned country houses in Baarn and Soest: 'Den Eult' and 'Pijnenburg', and nl:Kasteel de Hooge Vuursche. Between 1643 and 1646 he was lord of nl:Engelenburg.

=== Bicker Family ===
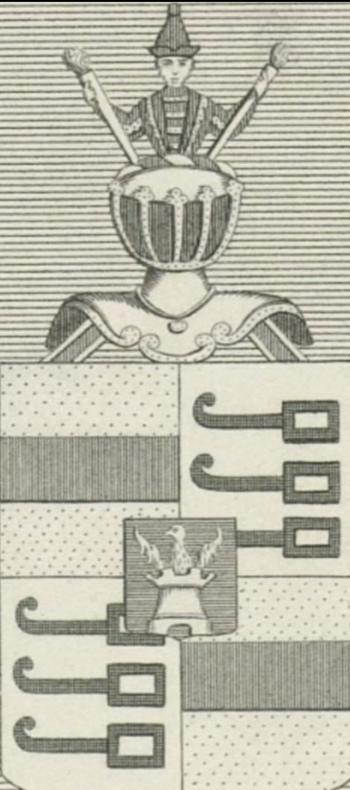
Coat of arms Jacob Bicker as Lord of Engelenburg

The Bicker family was one of the oldest patrician families of Amsterdam and belonged to the leading regent-oligarchy. The Bickers were the most powerful family in Amsterdam and decisively determined the fortunes of the city. The Bicker-De Graeff family-faction became the strongest competitor in the years after the Dutch uprising. They controlled Amsterdam's city government and the province of Holland for half a century. Both families were powerful and influential between the earlier 17th century and the Rampjaar 1672 during the height of the Republic's power. Through their work on the Amsterdam City Council and the Dutch East India and West India Company, the Bickers gained enormous influence on politico-economic self-determination in the young Dutch Republic due to the city's position of economic power within the Republic.

== Literature ==
- Matthias Laurenz Gräff: Jacob Bicker (1588-1646), 'der unbekannte Bicker'. Biografie eines Wirtschaftsmagnaten aus dem Goldenen Zeitalter der NiederlandeNiederlande' (2026)

== Sources ==
- (in Dutch) Zandvliet, Kees, De 250 rijksten van de Gouden Eeuw. Kapitaal, macht, familie en levensstijl (2006 Amsterdam; Nieuw Amsterdam Uitgevers), p. 73
- (in Dutch) Engelenburg in de Ebidat – Burgendatenbank des Europäischen Burgeninstitutes
