= Lambert Reynst =

Dutch regent

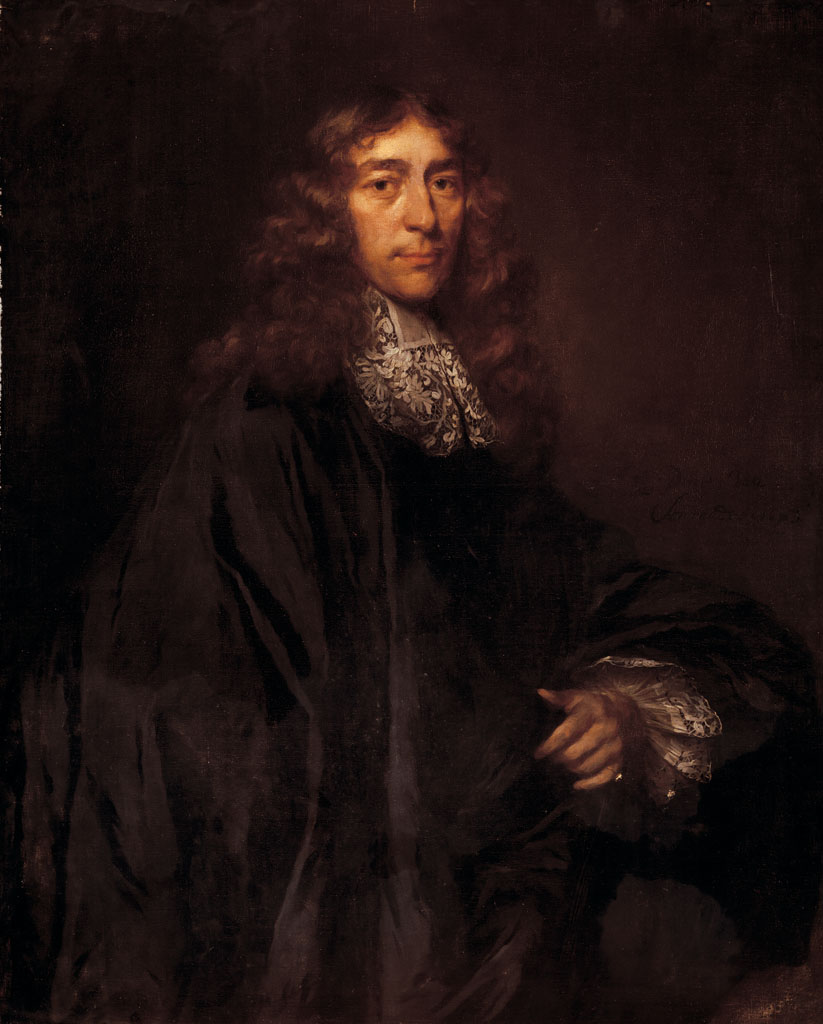
Lambert Reynst by Pieter van Anraedt, 1673 (Amsterdam Museum).

Lambert Reynst (1613–1679) was a Dutch regent and politician of the Golden Age. Born in Amsterdam, he belonged to the "republican" Dutch States Party.

== Family ==
He came from the patrician Reynst family and was the son of Hendrick Reynst and his wife Elisabeth Prinsen. He was also a cousin of the Grand Pensionary Johan de Witt and brother-in-law of the statesmen and Amsterdam burgomasters Cornelis de Graeff, Andries de Graeff and Cornelis Geelvinck, with the latter two he sat together during the Rampjaar 1672 in the Amsterdam Vroedschap. Lambert himself married Alida, daughter of Cornelis Bicker and Aertge Witsen.

== Life ==
Reynst worked as a lawyer and between 1649 and 1655 was a counsellor for the Dutch Admiralty in the Noorderkwartier. The family lived on Keizersgracht 71. In 1667 he became a 'bewindhebber' or governor of the Dutch East India Company and was made mayor of Amsterdam in 1667, 1668 and 1672. As mayor, he held a reception for Cosimo III de' Medici at the Van Campen Theatre.

When the Dutch Republic was attacked by Britain and France in the 'rampjaar' of 1672, the Dutch people turned to Johan de Witt and his brother Cornelis. After the death of both brothers and the rise of William III of Orange as stadtholder, Reynst, his brother-in-law Andries de Graeff, his cousins Pieter, Jacob de Graeff and Hans Bontemantel and nine others were dismissed. Reynst's successor as mayor was Johannes Hudde.

Between 1667 and 1672 Reynst was 'ambachtsheer' of Amstelveen and Nieuwer-Amstel. Reynst's housekeeper was Eeltien Vinck, who in 1668 married the painter Meindert Hobbema; the same year Hobbema obtained a job with the city council, and reduced his painting. Aernout van Overbeke, a 17th-century humorist, described Reynst as the city's greatest "hoerenjager" (literally, whore-hunter), which could mean one who frequented prostitutes or one who prosecuted them. He died in Amsterdam.

== Sources ==
- "Lambert Reynst in Amsterdam Museum" (in Dutch). Archived from the original on 2011-03-15.
