= Pieter Pietersz Bicker =

Dutch brewer & politician (1522–1585)

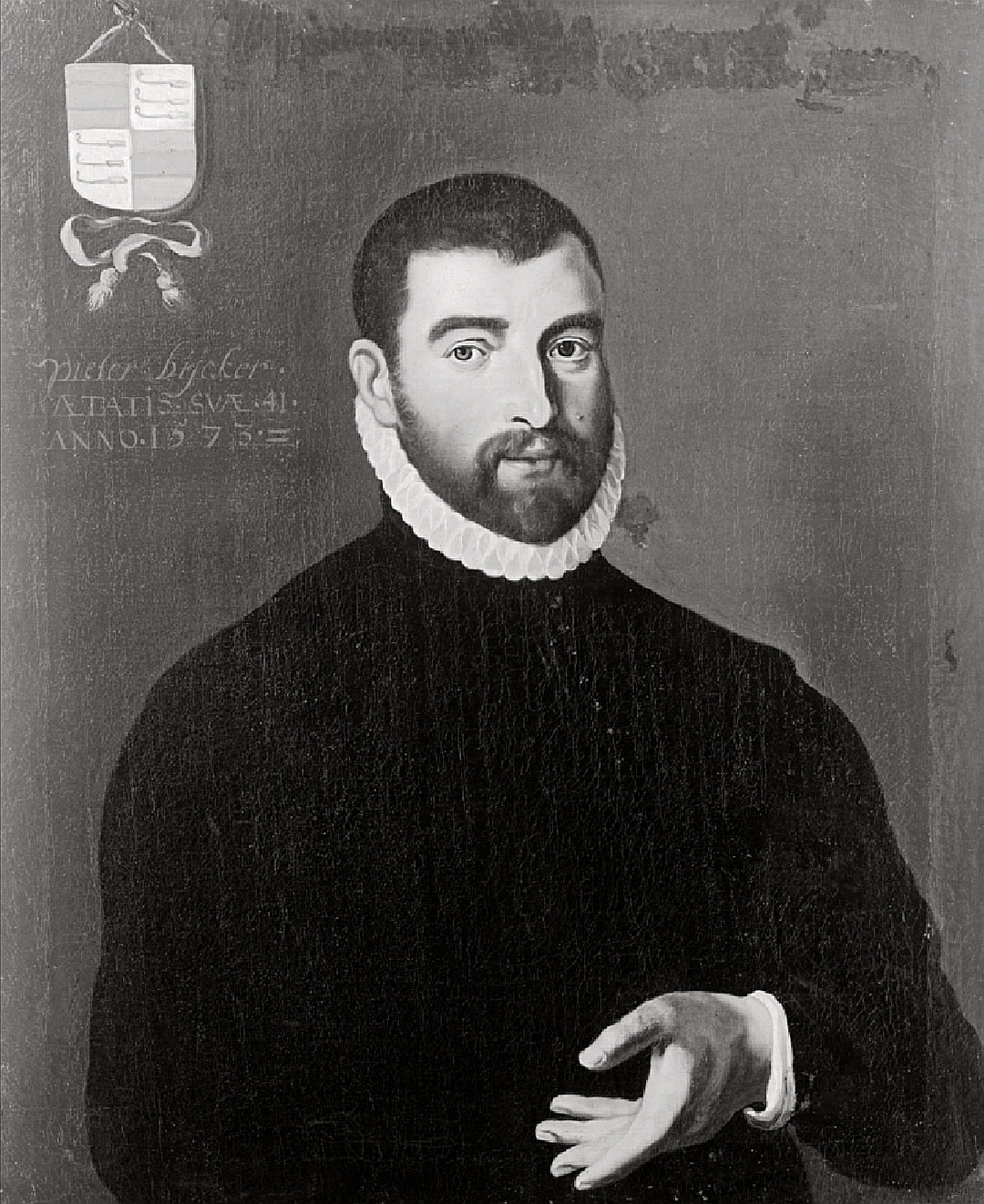
Portrait of Pieter Pietersz Bicker

Pieter Pietersz Bicker (born 1522 in Amsterdam, died 1585 Amsterdam) was a Dutch brewer and politician.

== Biography ==
Pieter Pietersz Bicker was the son of Pieter Gerritsz Bicker (1497–1567), Schepen of Amsterdam in 1534, and Anna Codde. His brothers were Dirk, Jan and Jacob Bicker. Pieter Gerritsz himself was a son of Machteld Pietersdr Bicker (circa 1455–1516) and Gerrit Dirkse (Helmer) van den Anxter (around 1450–1521/26) and had taken the family name Bicker from his mother, and therefore became the ancestor of the important Amsterdam patrician family Bicker.

Pieter Pietersz Bicker married to Lijsbeth Banninck [an ancestor of Frans Banninck Cocq] and had three sons with her:

- Gerrit Pietersz Bicker, (1554–1604), international trader and merchant, politician
- Jacob Pietersz Bicker (1555–1587) married Aeff Jacobsdr de Moes
  - Jacob Jacobsz Bicker (1581–1626), merchant, advisor and commissioner of Amsterdam, Heemraad van Nieuwer-Amstel
    - later noble branch of the family Bicker
- Laurens Bicker (1563–1606), traveller, Admiral, trader

His daughter Dieuwer Jacobsdr Bicker (1584-1641) came from his second marriage. She was married to Jan van Helmont and painted by Jacob Adriaensz Backer.

In 1566 Pieter Pietersz Bicker was involved as Amsterdam's envoy in the trade dispute with Danzig. In 1575 he undertook a journey to Friesland. On his return to Amsterdam he was banished from the city on suspicion of being in league with the Geuzen, but was pardoned a short time later because of his confession of the King of Spain as the legitimate Count of Holland and the Catholic religion. In 1576 he worked together with Dirck Jansz Graeff as a delegate of the Dutch States General in Hamburg and Bremen, where they were able to take out a loan of 600,000 guilders for the Dutch government.

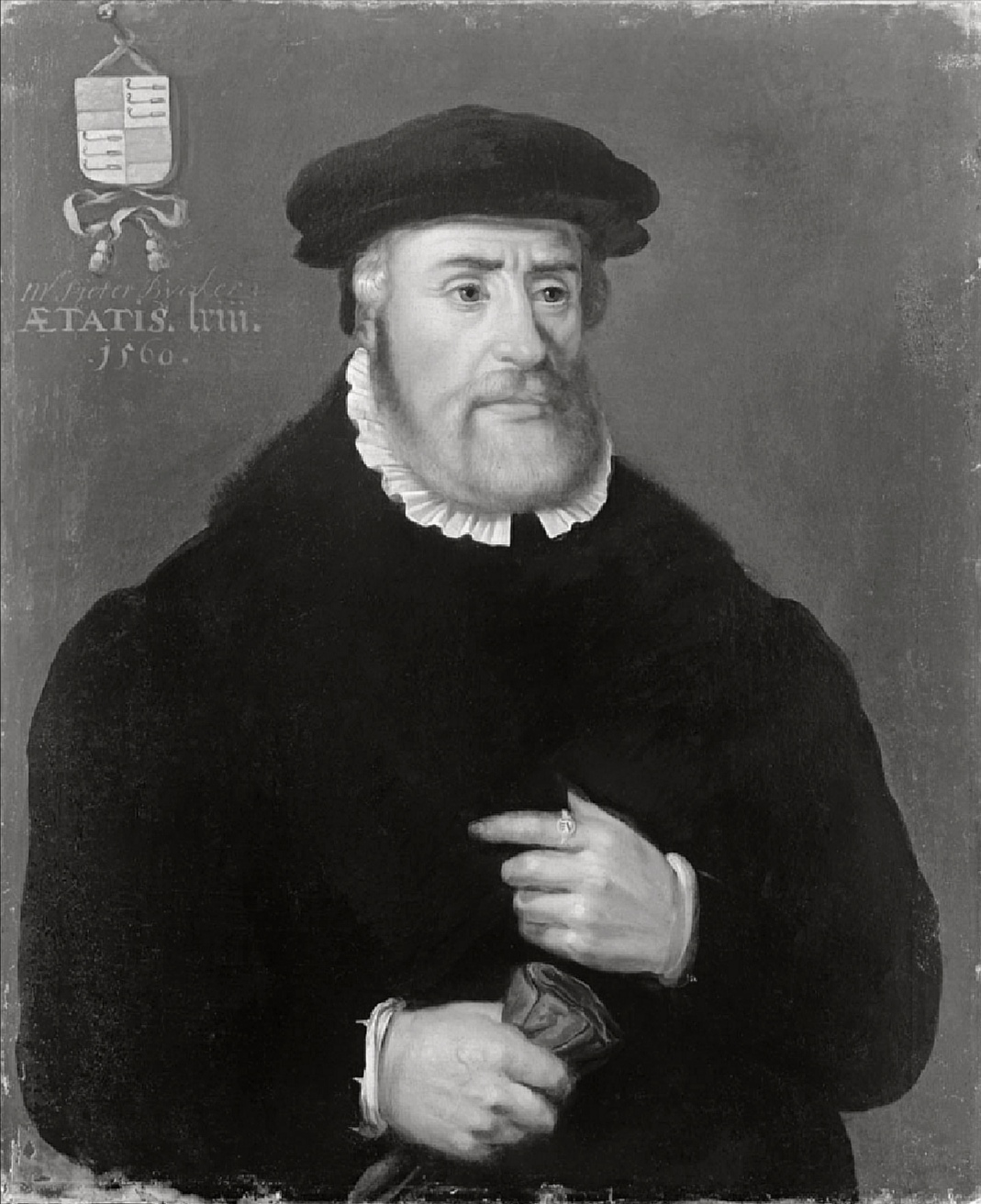
Bickers father Pieter Gerritsz Bicker (1497–1567)

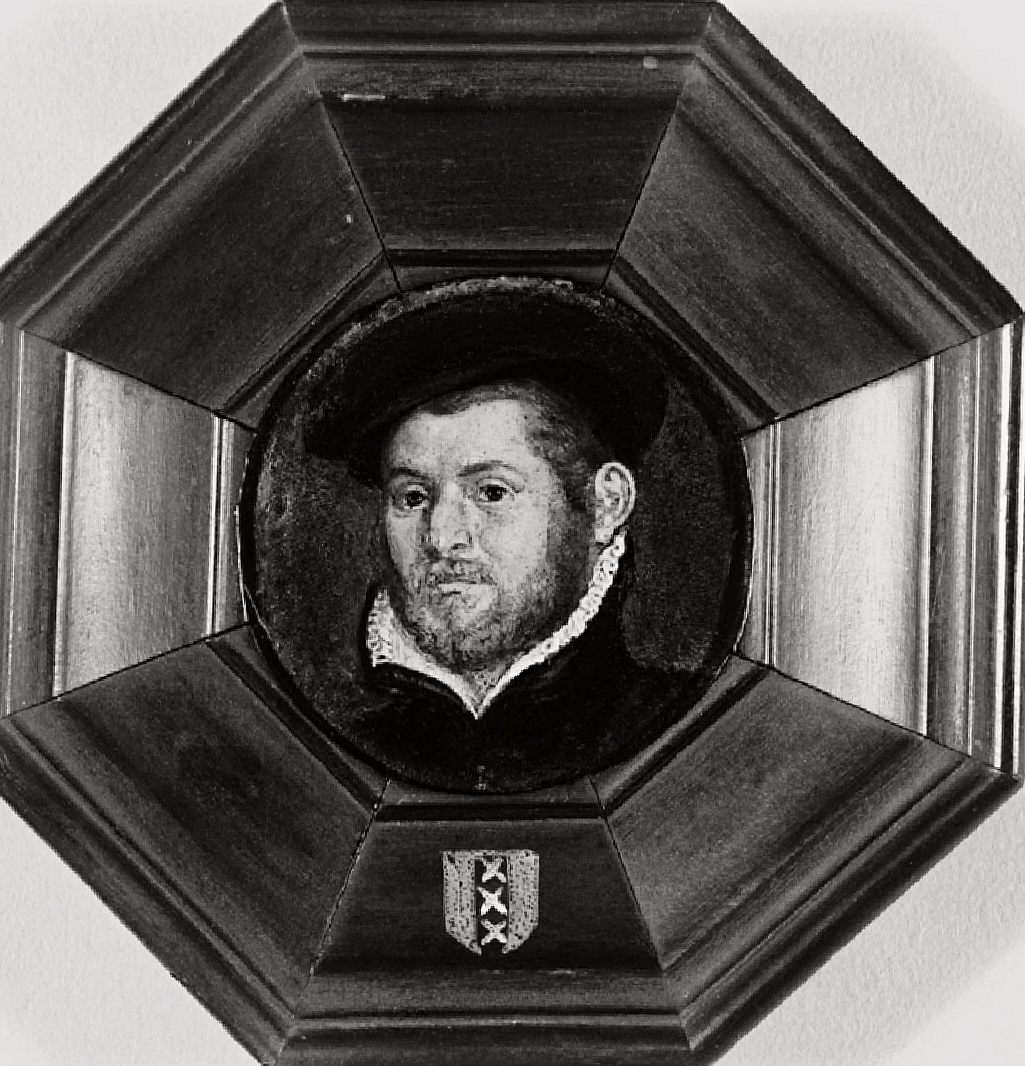
Bickers son (unsure) Jacob Pietersz Bicker
