= Witsen (family) =

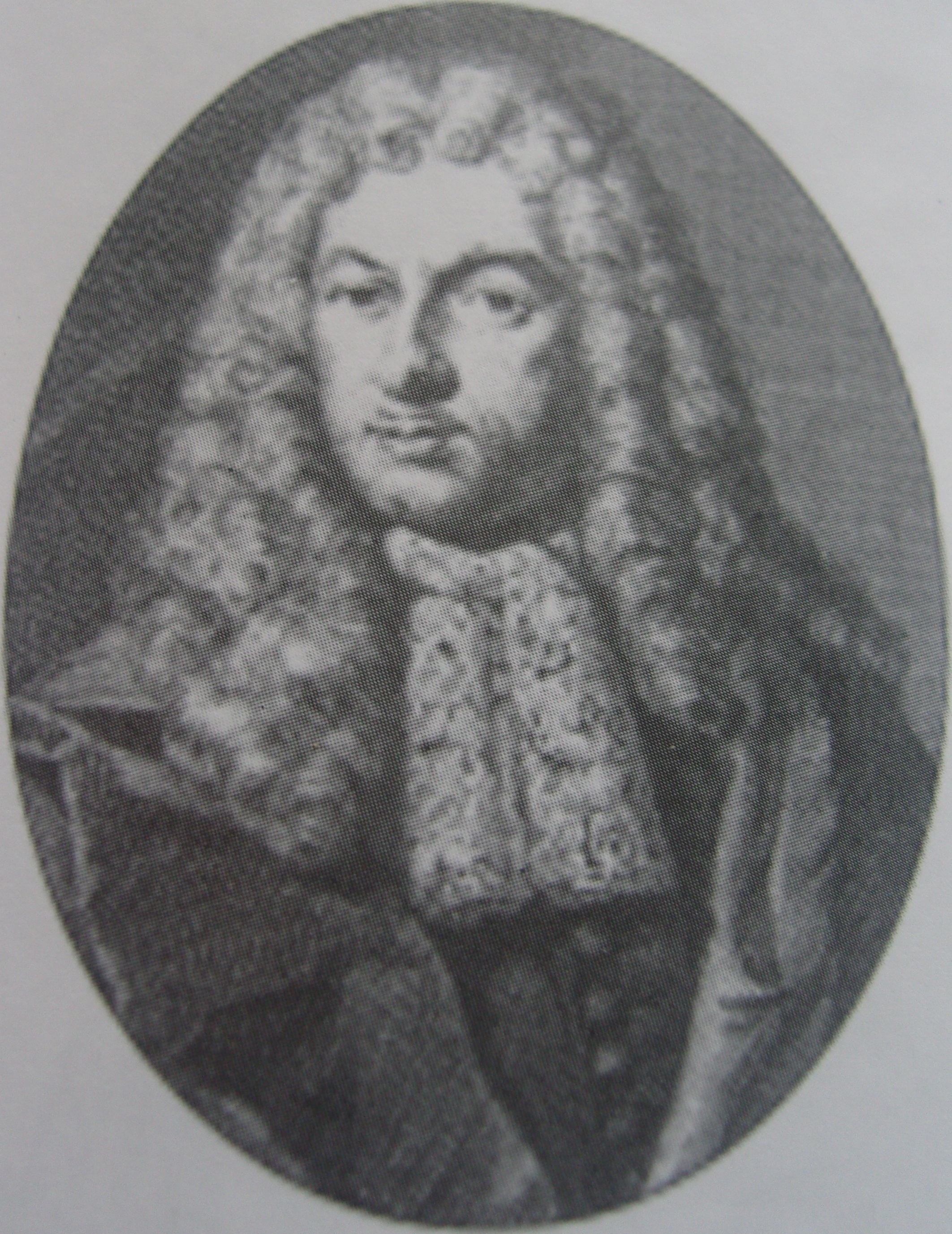
Nicolaes Witsen

Witsen (also spelled Witzen) is a patrician family of Amsterdam. Its most notable member was the politician and scholar Nicolaes Witsen, but many other members of the family also held leading roles in trade and politics from the Dutch Golden Age up until the French occupation of the Netherlands in the late 18th century.

== History ==
The Witsen family probably originated in Akersloot in Noord-Holland, where Jacob Witsz was a farmer and owned a farmhouse known as ‘de Noord’. A 1774 history of the family states that the family came from Schagerwaard, which had been known as the Witsmeer (literally the Wits lake) before it was reclaimed.

== Family tree ==
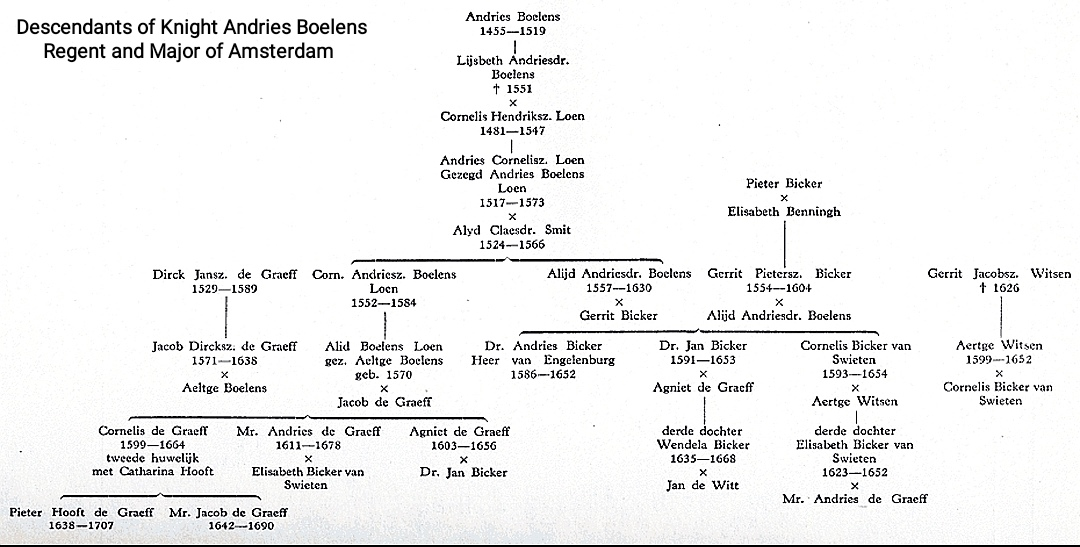
Overview of the personal family relationships of the Amsterdam oligarchy between the regent-dynasties Boelens Loen, De Graeff, Bicker (van Swieten), Witsen and Johan de Witt in the Dutch Golden Age

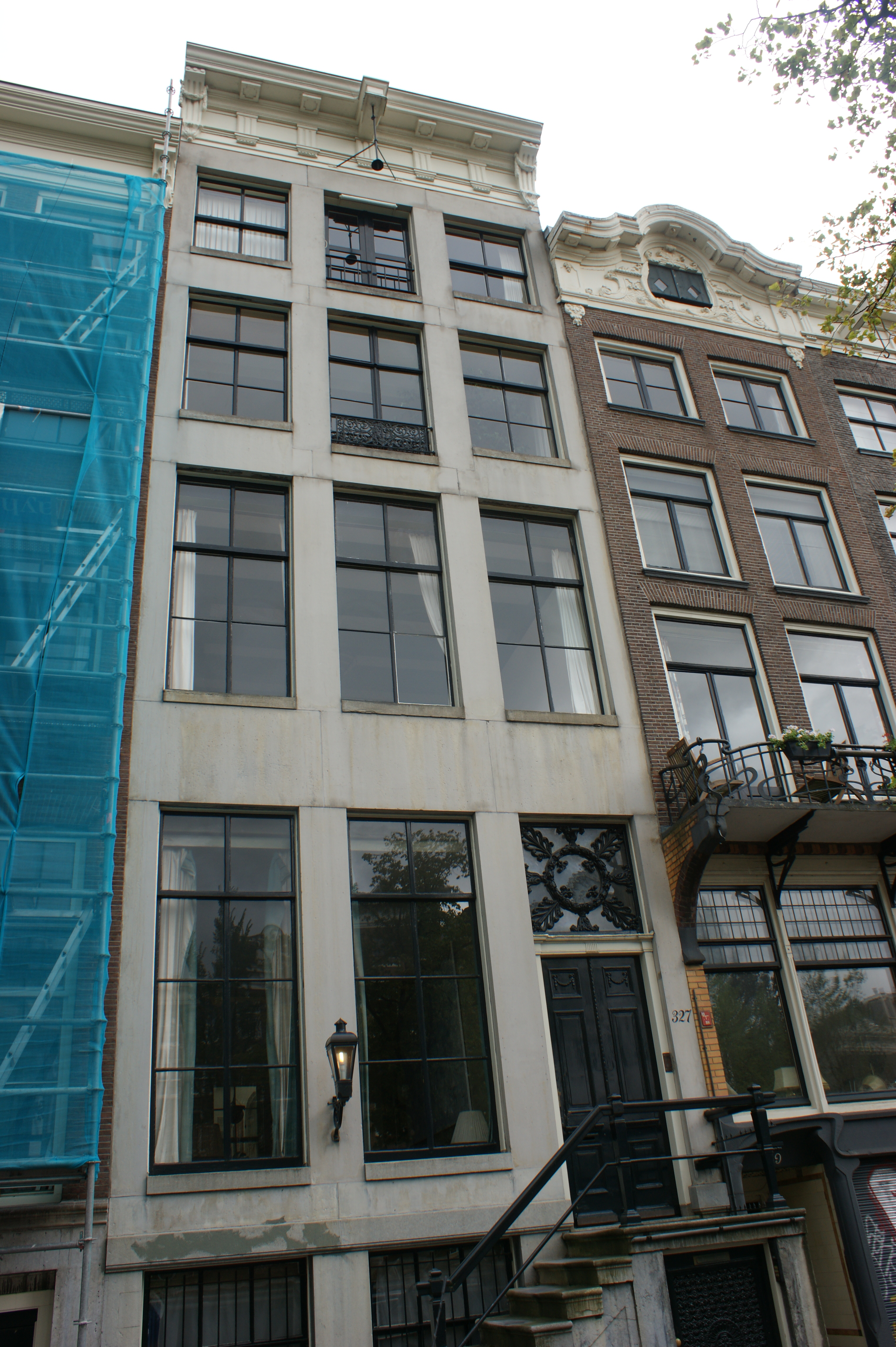
Keizersgracht 327, built around 1663 and sold in 1747

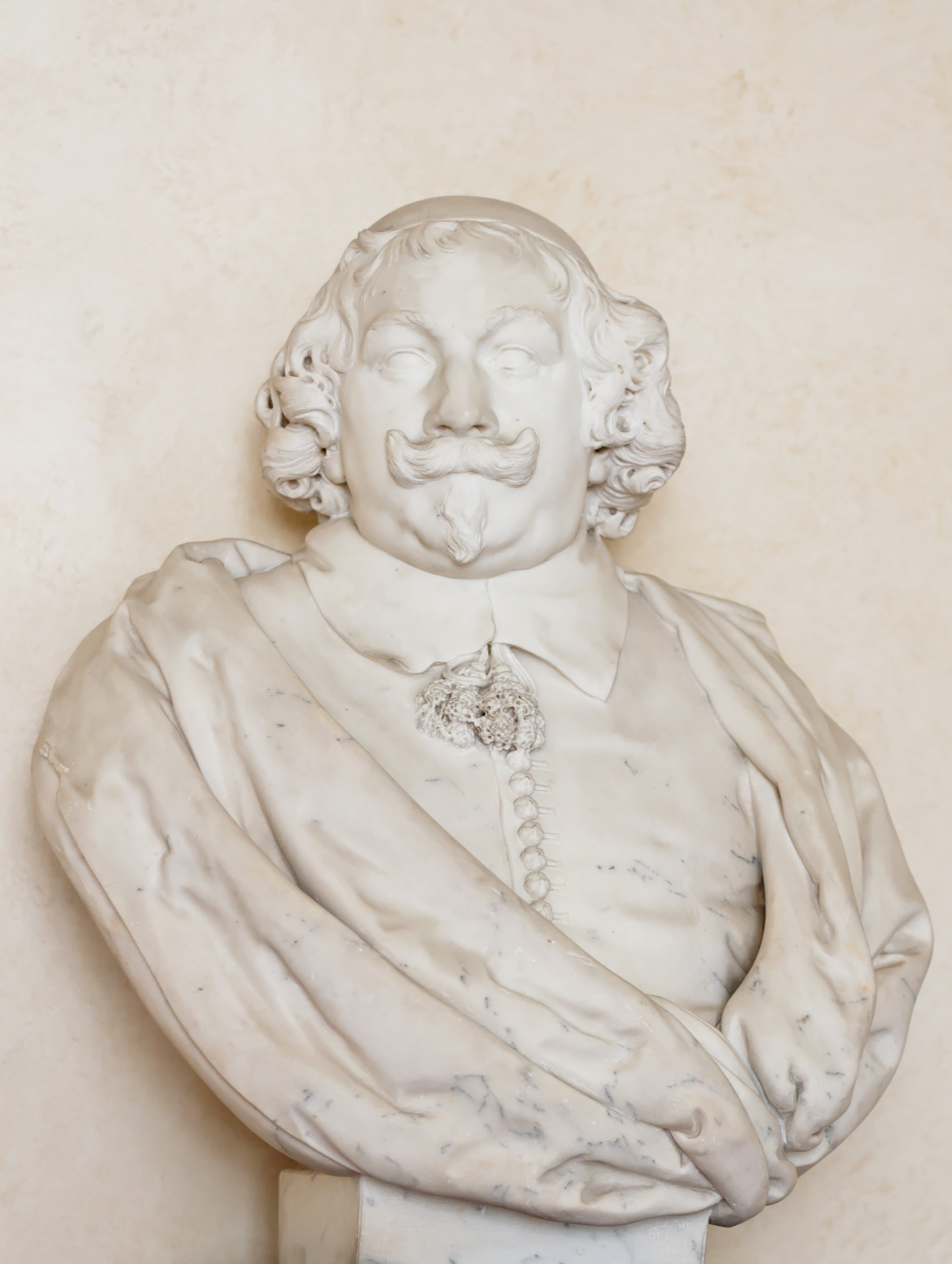
Artus Quellinus: Marble bust of Cornelis Jan Witsen, mayor of Amsterdam, 1658

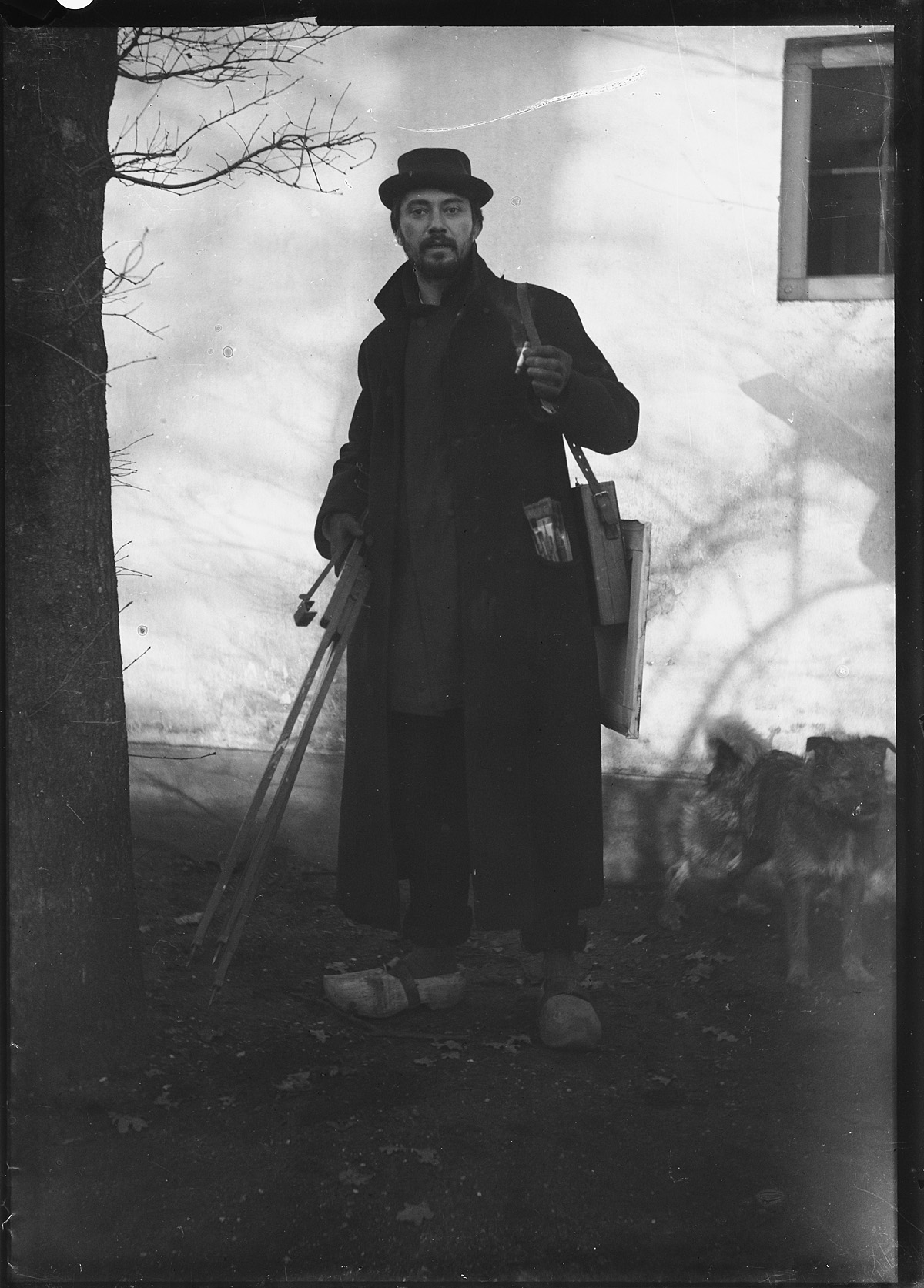
Self-portrait of Willem Witsen (ca. 1893)

- Gerrit Jacobsz. Witsen (-1626) was an influential salt merchant trading with France, Portugal and the Baltic Sea. He was mayor of Amsterdam in 1609, 1613 and 1618. He was painted by Michiel Jansz. van Mierevelt.
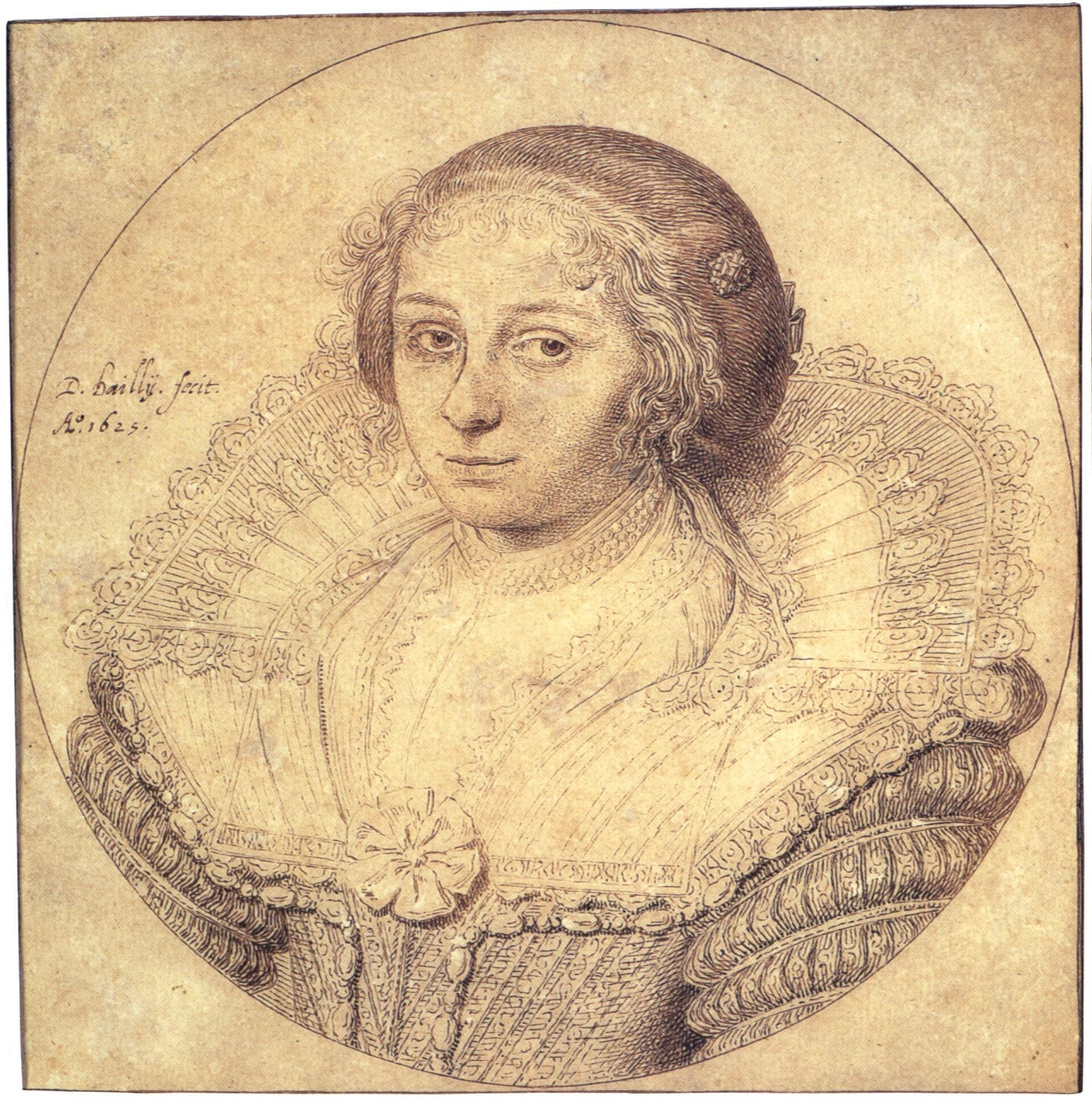
  - Aertge Witsen by David Bailly Clement C. Moore
    Aertge Witsen (1599-1652), who married Cornelis Bicker, lord Van Swieten and owner of Kasteel Swieten
- Cornelis Jacobsz. Witsen (-1595), who began his working life as a herring-packer but after the Alteratie quickly rose to become a counsellor and schepen; married Marrij Jacobsz (-1593).
  - Jonas Cornelisz. Witsen (1566-1626), mayor of Amsterdam in 1619, 1623 and 1624 and governor of the Noordsche Compagnie, the New Netherland Company and the Dutch West India Company. He traded with Levant, Palestine and Guinea and was also active alongside his brother Jan and his uncle Gerrit in trade with Russia. He lived on the Singel and in 1590 married Weijntje Jansdr. Swaeroogh. He, Frans Hendricksz. Oetgens and Barthold Cromhout speculated on the Third Increase in Amsterdam, mainly around the Haarlemmerdijk and the Westelijke Eilanden. He was also painted as a captain (with Volkert Overlander as his lieutenant) by Cornelis van der Voort. His daughter Marritje of Maria Witsen (1597-1683) married Gerrit Hudde, lived on the Singel. Johannes Hudde was her son
    - Cornelis Witsen (1599-1646) was secretary to Cornelis Haga, the Dutch Republic's first ambassador to the Ottoman Sultan and from 1628 its consul in Aleppo. He and Salomon Sweers left for the east in 1640, in 1641 he was on the 'Raad van Indië'; in 1642 and 1644 he was one of the backers of Abel Tasman's expedition; he died as governor of the Banda Islands.
    - Jan (1603-1636?), died unmarried
    - Jacob (1605-)
  - Jan Cornelisz. Witsen (1569-1636); in 1597 married Margrieta Oetgens. They had three children:
    - Petronella
    - Maria
    - Cornelis Jan Witsen (1605-1669); in 1634 married Catherina Claesdr. Gaeff, alias Opsie; lived at Herengracht 165; he had financial problems maintaining his status as a gentleman and caused Rembrandt's bankruptcy; Hans Bontemantel caricatured him as a useless drunk; around 1663 the family moved to Keizersgracht 327. In 1667 he was reluctantly appointed a schout.
      - Jan Witsen (1636-1676) married; city secretary; built up a notable cabinet of curiosities.
      - Lambert Cornelisz. Witsen (1638-1697); appointed captain at a young age; in 1666 in service of John Maurice, Prince of Nassau-Siegen; joined the local civic guard in 1676; lived near Oudemanhuispoort married Sara Nuijts in 1669, with whom he had eleven children:
        - Lambert Witsen (1681-1746) a bachelor, was from 1697 an officer in the civic guard and the last Witsen to live at Keizersgracht 327; his will included 82 paintings.
        - Nicolaes Witsen (II) (1682-1746) married Anna Catharina Tulp, a daughter of Dirck Tulp. He lived Herengracht 550. In 1720 he remarried Johanna Eleonora Huydecoper. He inherited his uncle Nicolaas Witsen (I)'s library but was only moderately interested; 2,300 books were auctioned in 1728 and 1747.
          - Nicolaes Witsen (III) the younger (1709-1780) inherited the manuscripts collected by several family members; sold at auction in 1761. Appointed as captain of the cavalry of civic guard in 1747. He traded in bonds and moved from Singel 210 (in 1742) to Westermarkt.
          - Lambert (1721-)
      - Nicolaes Witsen (I) (1641-1717) traveled to Russia in the company of Jacob Boreel in 1664. Thirteen times Mayor, author of a book about shipbuilding, and Tartary, cartographer of Siberia, collector of curiosities, books on theology, history and linguistics. He facilitated the young Peter the Great's famous visit to Holland, the Great Embassy and the expedition of Willem de Vlamingh to Australia. He was an expert on Ethiopia; manager in the Dutch East India Company, involved in the Hortus Botanicus Amsterdam, who pushed the idea to plant coffee in the Dutch colonies. In 1674 he married a minister's daughter Catharina de Hochepied from Sluis; their six children died young and they instead adopted the children after the death of his brothers. In 1711 he moved to the Gouden Bocht, either at Herengracht 440 or 479. After Witsen's death, his notes were considered lost for a long time. In 1886 did it become known in the Netherlands that copies of Nicolaas Witsen's diary and notes were kept in Paris; 300 years later a book was published: Nicolaas Witsen. Moscovische Reyse, 1664—1665. 's-Gravenhage, 1966—1967.
      - Cornelis Witsen (1645-1680); army captain who never married; died due to a fall from his horse
      - Jonas Witsen (1647-1675) laid the foundation stone of the new stadhuis op de Dam, and possibly for 's Lands Zeemagazijn; he travelled widely and was very cultured; he was painted by Jan Lievens. He married Sara van Raey in 1675, but died two weeks later.
        - Jonas Witsen (1676-1715); baptised eight months after his father's death; adopted by his uncle, collected paintings and gained three plantations in Suriname thanks to his marriage to his first wife Elisabeth Basseliers; lived as mayor at Keizersgracht 674; in 1704 remarried to Isabella Maria Hooft; had one daughter:
          - Catharina Witsen; married Gerrit Hooft Gerritsz
          - Jonas Witsen (1705-1767); counsellor to the Admiralty for the Noorderkwartier; in 1731 married Alberta Maria Pels; colonel in the civic guard; mayor in 1765; lived at Keizersgracht 672, now the Museum Van Loon.
            - Jonas Witsen (1733-1788); in 1761 married Anna Maria van Marselis. From 1771 he lived in the house of Gerrit Braamcamp on the Gouden Bocht; in 1770 he sold four plantations in Suriname.
              - Jonas Witsen (1765-1795); in 1793 married the actress Johanna Susanna van der Stel
                - Jonas Witsen (1795-1877); in 1818 married Helena Meijlant
                  - Jonas Jan Witsen (1819-1901); in 1848 married Jacoba Elisabeth Bonekamp
                    - Willem Witsen (1860-1923); in 1893 married Elisabeth van Vloten, daughter of nl:Johannes van Vloten, but divorced her a few years later; in 1907 married Augusta Maria Schorr
                      - Erik Witsen (1896-1982); in 1925 married Catharina Franciska van den Broek, daughter of Antonius van den Broek
                        - Jenno Witsen (1927-); in 1957 married Ineke de Leede
          - Nicolaas Witsen Jonasz (1707-1739); in 1734 married Constantia Hooft; lived at Herengracht 550; father of
            - Hester Witsen (1736-1771); in 1756 married Pieter Elias.
