= Regenten =

Dutch rulers and leaders between the 16th and 18th centuries

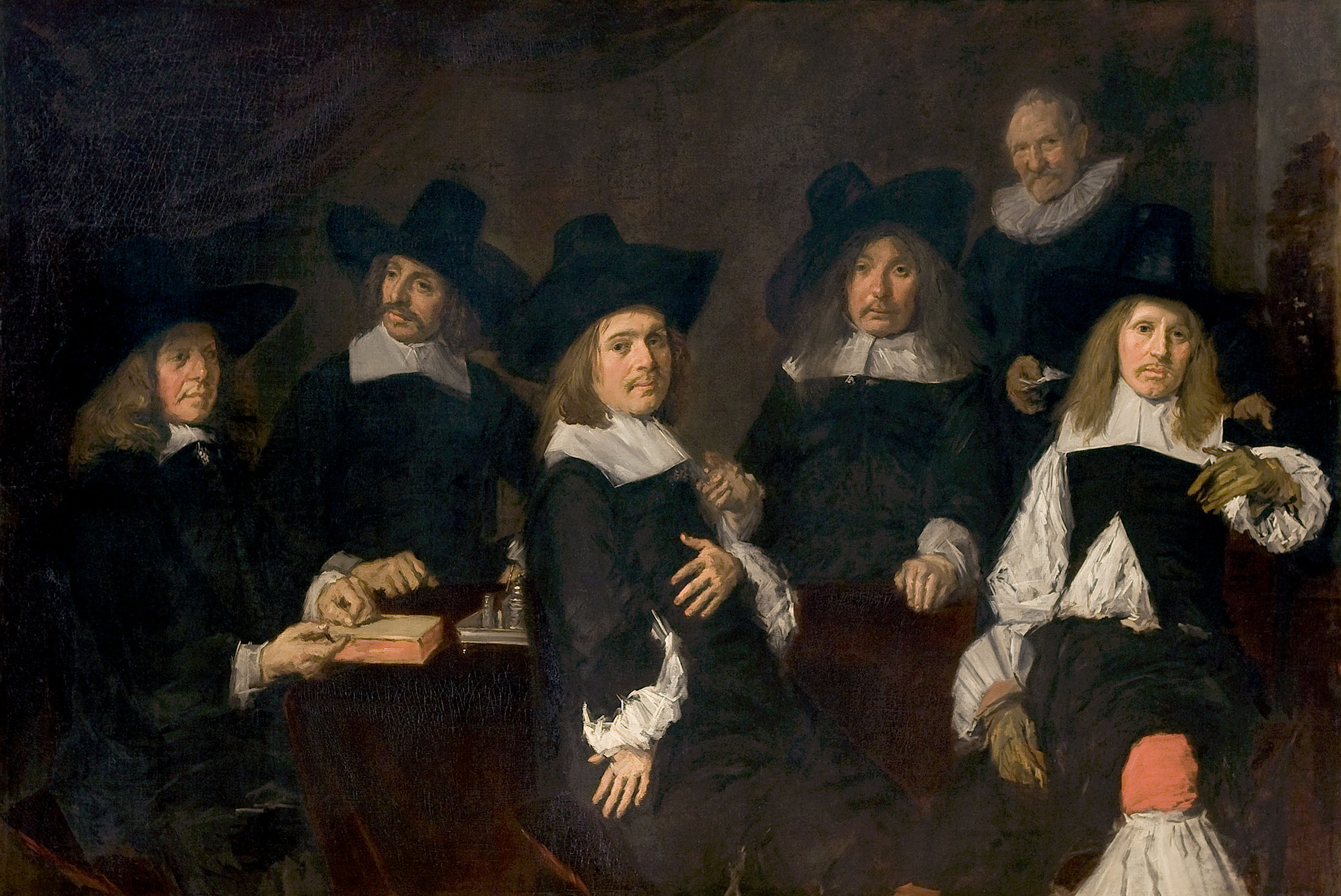
Regents of the Old Men's Almshouse at Haarlem by Frans Hals, 1664

The regenten (Dutch plural for regent) were the rulers of the Dutch Republic from the 16th through the 18th century, the leaders of the Dutch cities or the heads of organisations (e.g. "regent of an orphanage"). Though not formally a hereditary "class", they were de facto "patricians", comparable to that ancient Roman class. Since the Late Middle Ages Dutch cities had been run by the richer merchant families, who gradually formed a closed group. At first the lower-class citizens in the guilds and schutterijen could unite to form a certain counterbalance to the regenten, but in the course of the 15th century the administration of the cities and towns became oligarchical in character. From the latter part of the 17th century the regent families were able to reserve government offices to themselves via quasi-formal contractual arrangements. In practice they could only be dislodged by political upheavals, like the Orangist revolution of 1747 and the Patriot revolt of 1785.

== Origins ==
The regenten as the cities' ruling class originated in the 13th century, arising over the course of time under the influence of several factors. Commoners managed to obtain emancipation from dependent status as serfs by making skillful use of the power struggle between the sovereign and the nobility; the result was that their towns became a new power in medieval feudal society which could ultimately be dominated by neither the sovereign nor the nobility. The nobility's and rulers' incomes were often not enough to pay their mercenaries or their own army. They therefore needed financial assistance from the up-and-coming merchant class in the growing towns. This class could thus induce the sovereigns to grant municipal charters and city rights, establishing autonomy in the regulating of the city's internal affairs.

=== Rise of the regenten ===
This newly acquired autonomy brought into being a new group of "managers" next to the sovereign's deputy, the schout, to run the city. These city councillors were often recruited from the wealthiest citizens. Medieval city-dwellers were of the opinion that the vroedschap, from which the magistrates were chosen, had to consist of de weisten, treffelijksten en rijksten van de stadsbevolking (the wisest, most respected, and richest of the city's population). Men of wealth were deemed to be the people most able to guarantee the prosperity of the city. To keep the peace was in their personal interest, and because they were already rich, one could hope that they would not plunder the city coffers.

=== Increasing power ===
In the first half of the 15th century, the Burgundian dukes tightened their grip on the cities in the county of Holland (of which they had just obtained control). Philip the Good promoted the situation in which the regenten could exert a greater control over the city and her inhabitants, by diminishing the influence of the guilds. The vroedschappen were given the power to co-opt members, instead of using a more open electoral process. Members of a vroedschap were usually appointed for life, or during good behavior, whenever a vacancy arose. Similar developments took place in the other provinces.

The vroedschap was the body that nominated candidates for burgemeesters and schepenen in annual or biannual elections, by drawing up double lists from which the ducal stadtholder made a selection. These nominees were usually members of the vroedschap, though this was not a formal requirement for office. Members of the vroedschap were usually also the representatives of the cities that voted in the states of the provinces (of which there were 18 in Holland; the other cities were not represented).

These arrangements remained basically in place after the Dutch Revolt. In 1581 the Northern provinces renounced their ruler, Philip II, by the Act of Abjuration; after failed experiments with other foreign sovereigns, from 1588 on sovereignty was assumed by the provincial states and the states-general. From then on, the urban regenten were the de facto and de jure rulers of the republic.

== Developments under the republic ==
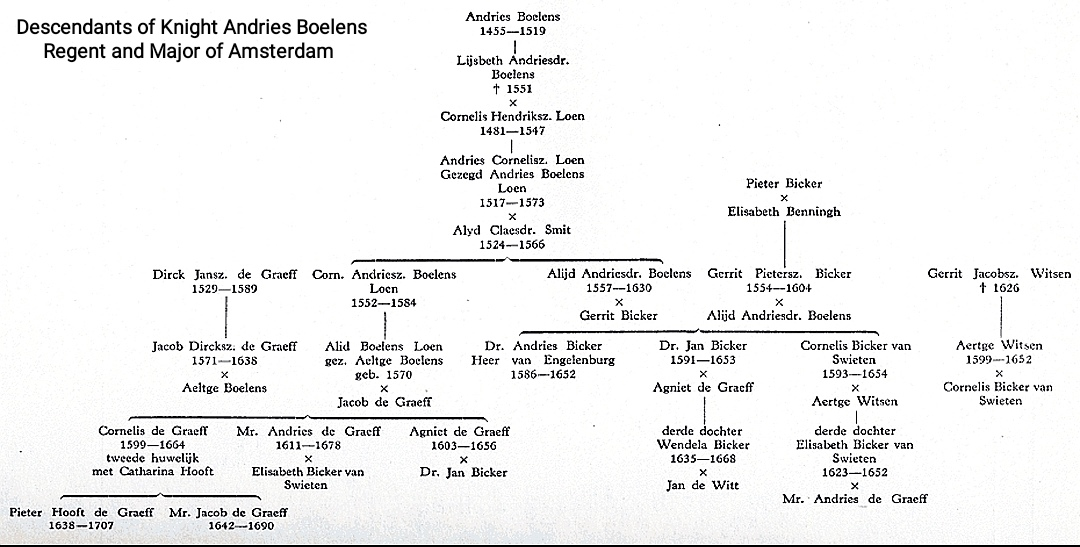
Overview of the personal family relationships of the Amsterdam oligarchy between the regent-dynasties Boelens Loen, De Graeff, Bicker (van Swieten), Witsen and Johan de Witt in the Dutch Golden Age

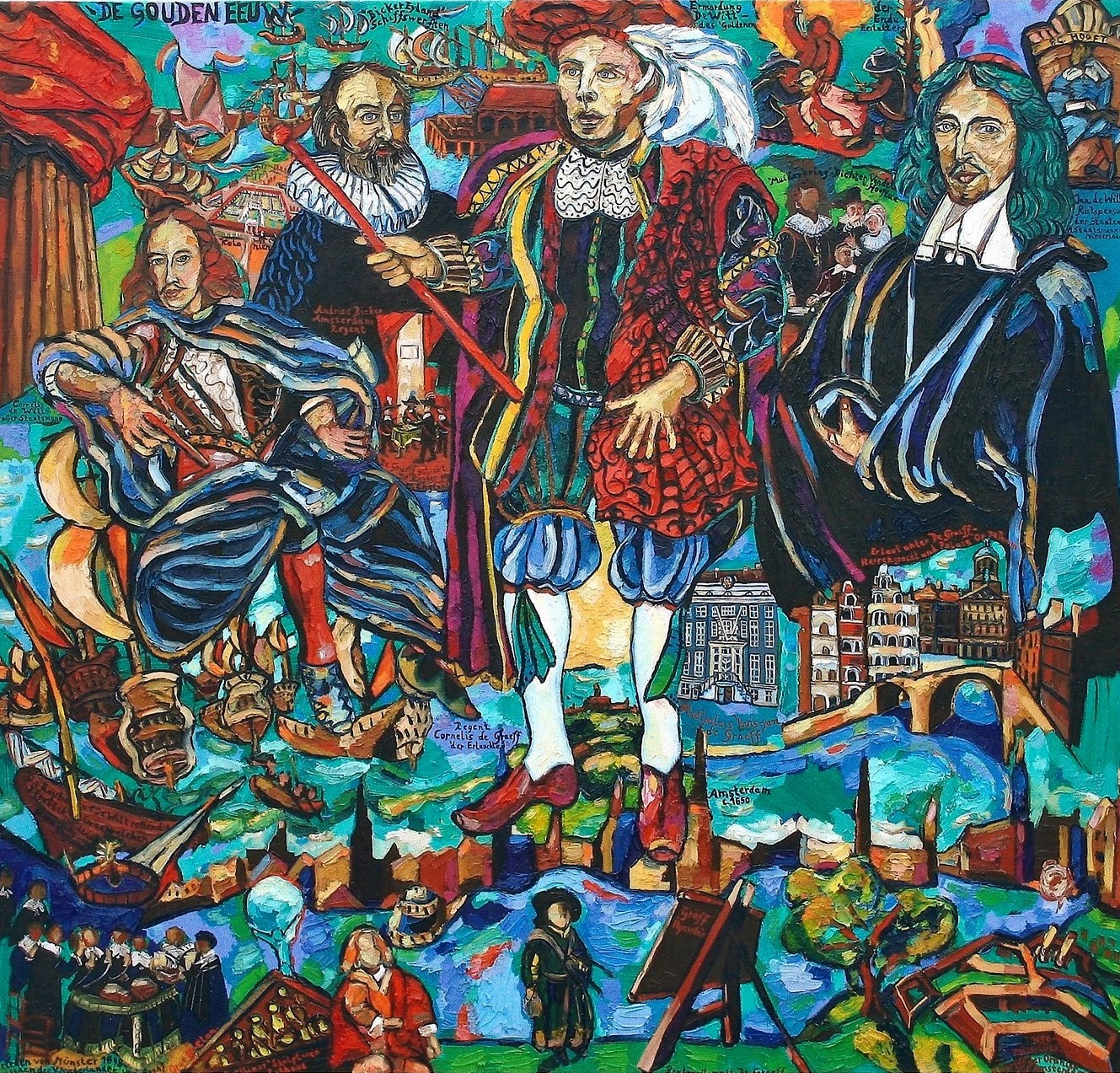
Historical-allegorical painting "De Gouden eeuw" about the De Graeff family of the Dutch Golden Age. The painting shows the protagonists around the Amsterdam regent Cornelis de Graeff (middle) and his relatives Johan de Witt (right), Cornelis de Witt (left) and Andries Bicker (second from left) as well as some events from this decade. (Painting by Matthias Laurenz Gräff, 2007)

Formally, little changed in the constitutional arrangements of the republic, compared to those of the preceding Habsburg Netherlands. For instance, though there was no more scope for the stadtholders to represent a deposed king, the new republic found a new role for them, though they now received their commissions from the sovereign provincial states. Equally, the same 18 cities made up the states that held the vote before. What changed after the revolt was the political makeup of these institutions. In most cities the old regenten were purged, and replaced with adherents to the new political order. In general, Catholic regenten were replaced with supporters of the "New Religion" (as were the Catholic members of the ridderschappen, the groups of nobles that represented the countryside in the States).

The new groups of regenten turned out to be representatives of a new economic elite that soon managed to bring about a rapid economic rise of the Netherlands, as described in Economic History of the Netherlands (1500–1815). In these early days access to political office was still relatively open. The new power holders belonged to the newly rich classes, but they did not represent them, nor was membership in these classes a prerequisite for office. If one speaks of a "regent class" the word "class" is therefore used in a loose sense.

The practice of co-option tended to perpetuate the same people in office in normal times. However, political upheavals could cause a wholesale replacement of the regent-elites, as had happened in the revolt years 1572–1578. Such upheavals were:

- the purge of the Remonstrant regents after the coup d'état of stadtholder Maurice of Nassau in 1618
- the replacement of the Orangist regents after the death of stadtholder William II by Cornelis de Graeff, Andries Bicker among others, issuing into the First Stadtholderless Period
- the replacement of the followers of Johan de Witt by Orangist regents in the Rampjaar 1672
- the replacement of Orangist regents by their opponents after the death of stadtholder William III, issuing in the Second Stadtholderless Period
- the restoration of the Stadtholderate in 1747, which brought the Orangists to power again
- the Patriot revolt of 1785 and
- the suppression of that revolt in 1787 by Prussian intervention
- the overthrow of the Stadtholderate in 1795, which brought the Patriot regents, ousted in 1787, to power again.

To consolidate his own position, Stadtholder William III encouraged the regenten who were in power during his regime, to make mutual arrangements, in which they promised to reserve government positions for scions of allied families, the so-called contracten van correspondentie ("contracts of correspondence"). Such arrangements were also used by their opponents when those reverted to power. Such arrangements helped to close the oligarchy even more in the 18th century, which explained the increasing intensity of the partisanship between the Orangist and Republican (under various names) factions during that era.

During that century the regenten (of both factions) became more and more removed from the merchant classes, from which their forebears had come. They instead became representatives of the rentier class that came into being because of the enormous growth of the Dutch public debt as a consequence of the turn-of-the-century conflicts with France. This economic interest militated against forceful political reforms, and reforms in public finance, that would have been necessary to successfully withstand the political and economic crises that confronted the republic after 1780.

This perceived lack of capacity for reform helped to bring about the attempted revolution of 1785 and the successful revolution of 1795 that eventually helped replace the regent-oligarchy with a short-lived democracy in the first years of the Batavian Republic.

== Sources ==
- Israel, J.I. (1995), The Dutch Republic: Its Rise, Greatness and Fall, 1477-1806, Oxford University Press,ISBN 0-19-873072-1 hardback, ISBN 0-19-820734-4 paperback
- Price, J.L. (1998), The Dutch Republic in the Seventeenth Century, New York: St. Martin's Press, ISBN 0-312-21732-3 clothbound, ISBN 0-312-21733-1 paperback
