= Schout =

Sheriff in Dutch-speaking areas

In Dutch-speaking areas, a schout was a local official appointed to carry out administrative, law enforcement and prosecutorial tasks. The office was abolished with the introduction of administrative reforms during the Napoleonic period.

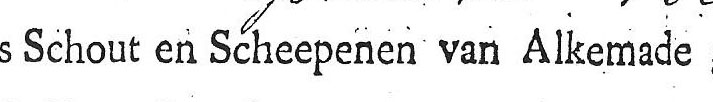
"Schout en scheepenen van Alkemade" as printed on an 1806 Dutch marriage document

== Functions ==
The exact nature of the office varied from place to place and changed over the course of time. In general, a schout was appointed by the lord (heer) of a domain (heerlijkheid) and acted in the lord's name in the local day-to-day administration of the domain, especially the administration of justice. A schout had three main functions: administration, law enforcement and criminal prosecution.

First, the schout was responsible for many local administrative matters in the town or heerlijkheid. The schout presided in the meetings of the schepenen. Together, the schout and schepenen made up what we would call the "town council" today. He ensured decrees were published. He sometimes represented the town or heerlijkheid in business matters or in negotiations with other towns. In these functions, a schout was somewhat like a modern-day mayor.

The phrase schout en schepenen appears in many legal documents from before the Napoleonic period, including the civil registration of marriages. Depending on the context and in what capacity they were acting, this phrase could mean something like the "mayor and aldermen" (i.e. the town council) or it could mean "the sheriff and magistrates".

Second, the schout was responsible for public order and policing. He was responsible for investigating a crime, apprehending a criminal and presenting the criminal to the court of magistrates (schepenen) for judgment. He or his men checked the drinking houses, carried out conscription orders, made sure taxes were paid and enforced the law. After a criminal verdict was given, the schout was responsible for carrying out the sentence. In these functions, he was somewhat like a modern-day chief of police.

Third, a schout prosecuted suspected criminals and presided over the sessions of the magistrates (schepenen) when they sat as a court. The schout was not the judge, but directed the court proceedings. In this function, he was somewhat like a modern-day prosecutor.

== New Amsterdam ==
The office was brought with the Dutch to the American colony of New Netherland. The first schout (sometimes called the schout-fiscal) in New Amsterdam after it was granted the authority to form its own local government in 1652 was Cornelis van Tienhoven, although officers were appointed to the post from at least 1626 when Jan Lampo was appointed. The schout had a seat on the Executive Council, but no vote, and would step down from the bench when acting as prosecutor, at which time the remaining members of the Council would function as the Court of Justice. The final schout was William Knyff, who held the office in 1674 when the colony was returned to the English.

The origins of the American public prosecutor (attorney general) have been traced to the schout in New Amsterdam.

== Related titles ==
Schout is the word usually used in Dutch, but there were a number of other terms used for this or similar offices in Dutch-speaking lands. The terms used included schout, baljuw, drost, drossaard, amman and meier. Perhaps the most common alternative name for this office in Dutch was baljuw. Baljuw is usually translated into English as "bailiff".

The word schout, depending on its context, can be translated variously into English, usually as sheriff, bailiff, or reeve, but strictly in their respective medieval senses. As a result, the Dutch word is sometimes used in English (even though schout is not actually a word in English). In Dutch, the plural of schout is schouten.

The Dutch word schout comes from Middle Dutch scouthete, in turn from Old Low Franconian skolthēti, and is cognate with Old English scyldhǣta, sculthēta "reeve, (medieval) bailiff", German Schultheiß, (Swiss) Schulze "bailie (magistrate)", from PGmc *skuldi-haitijō "debt-orderer". The office was occasionally referred to in Latin as scultetus.

The Dutch equivalent of the naval rank of Rear Admiral is called Schout-Bij-Nacht (literally, schout at night).

== Famous Figure ==
Adolf Wilhelm Verbond Hinne or Tuan Schout Van Hinne was famous for capturing Si Pitung (The Seven Friends) in Tanah Abang, Batavia in October 1893. The Schout led an ambush and shot the fugitive during a gun fight in a cemetery.

== See also ==
- Schout-bij-nacht
