= Schepen =

Municipal magistrate in Belgium

A schepen (Dutch, pronounced [ˈsxeːpə(n)]; pl. schepenen), échevin (French, pronounced [eʃ(ə)vɛ̃], [ɛʃvɛ̃]), Schöffe (German, pronounced [ˈʃœfə]) or Schäffe (Luxembourgish) is a municipal officer in Belgium, Luxembourg, and formerly the Netherlands, where it has been replaced by the wethouder (a municipal executive).

In modern Belgium, the schepen or échevin is part of the municipal government. Depending on the context, it may be roughly translated as an alderman, councillor, or magistrate.

== Name ==
The Dutch word schepen comes from the Old Saxon word scepino 'judge' and is related to German Schöffe 'lay magistrate'. In early Medieval Latin used in France, it was scabinus.

Originally, the word referred to member of a council of "deciders" – literally, "judgment finders" (oordeelvinders) – that sat at a mandatory public assembly called a ding ("thing" in English). Their judgments originally required ratification by a majority of the people present. Later, mandatory attendance (dingplicht) and ratification were no longer required.

== Belgium ==
In Flanders, a schepen is a town alderman who serves on the executive board in the municipal government. It is generally translated into English as "alderman", "municipal councillor" or "town councillor", though none of these is an exact equivalent.

Historically, schepen had different functions.

- From the post-Roman era until the 19th century, a schepen was a 'judgment finder' (oordeelvinders). They sat in a mandatory public assembly, the Vierschaar, often a roofless building in which 4 benches were installed along the 4 walls. Later the name of the institute of the council of Aldermen became the Schepenbank. The Schepenen legislated (made laws), ratified treaties, and acted as judges.
- Modern schepen are usually translated as "alderman", but unlike Anglosphere aldermen, schepenen serve together with the burgomaster as the executive power of the municipal government and not just elected councillors.

Each Flemish municipality has an elected town council. During the first meeting of a newly elected town council, council members vote by secret ballot to elect the schepenen from amongst their ranks. An absolute majority (more than half the votes) is required for a schepen to be voted in. Once elected, the schepenen serve with the mayor on an executive board charged with the day-to-day management of town and city affairs, and also continue to exercise their legislative powers as town councillors. The executive board is referred to in Dutch as the "college van burgemeester en schepenen".

Schepenen are often assigned portfolio areas such as culture, education or city planning. They have several executive responsibilities relating to their portfolios and thus assist the mayor in governing the town or city.

The total number of schepenen in a town depends on its population. A city like Antwerp has ten; whereas Herstappe, the smallest community in Belgium, has only two. Since a schepen is also an ordinary town councillor, the schepen must be re-elected to remain in the office of schepen. Since 2006, Belgian citizenship has not been a requirement for the position.

== Netherlands ==
In the Netherlands, schepenen have been replaced by wethouders.

Historically, schepenen had administrative and judicial duties in a Dutch seigneury (heerlijkheid). When acting in an administrative capacity, a schepen was similar to an alderman or town councillor, and is usually called that in English.

When acting in a judicial capacity, the schepenen were often referred to as the schepenbank. One of the functions of the schepenbank was to pass judgment on criminals, thereby functioning as a jury or magistrates' bench. In this context, they are a sort of magistrate.

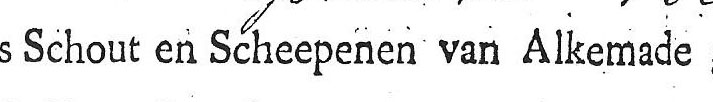
Image of "schout and scheepenen van Alkemade" as written in a 1806 Dutch marriage document

The phrase schout en schepenen appears in many legal documents prior to the Napoleonic period, including the civil register of marriages. This phrase was used in both administrative and judicial contexts. If they were acting in an administrative capacity, schout en schepenen may be expressed in English as "the mayor and aldermen" (or a similar phrase like "the mayor and councillors"). If they were acting in a judicial capacity, schout en schepenen may be expressed in English as "magistrate's court" (or a similar phrase like "magistrates' bench" or "aldermen's court").

The office of schepen was dissolved by the Napoleonic reforms at the end of the Ancien Régime.

== See also ==
- Voorleser
- Schöffe, the German equivalent
- šepmistr, the Czech equivalent
- scabino, the medieval Italian equivalent
