= Jacob Dircksz de Graeff =

Dutch regent (1570–1638)

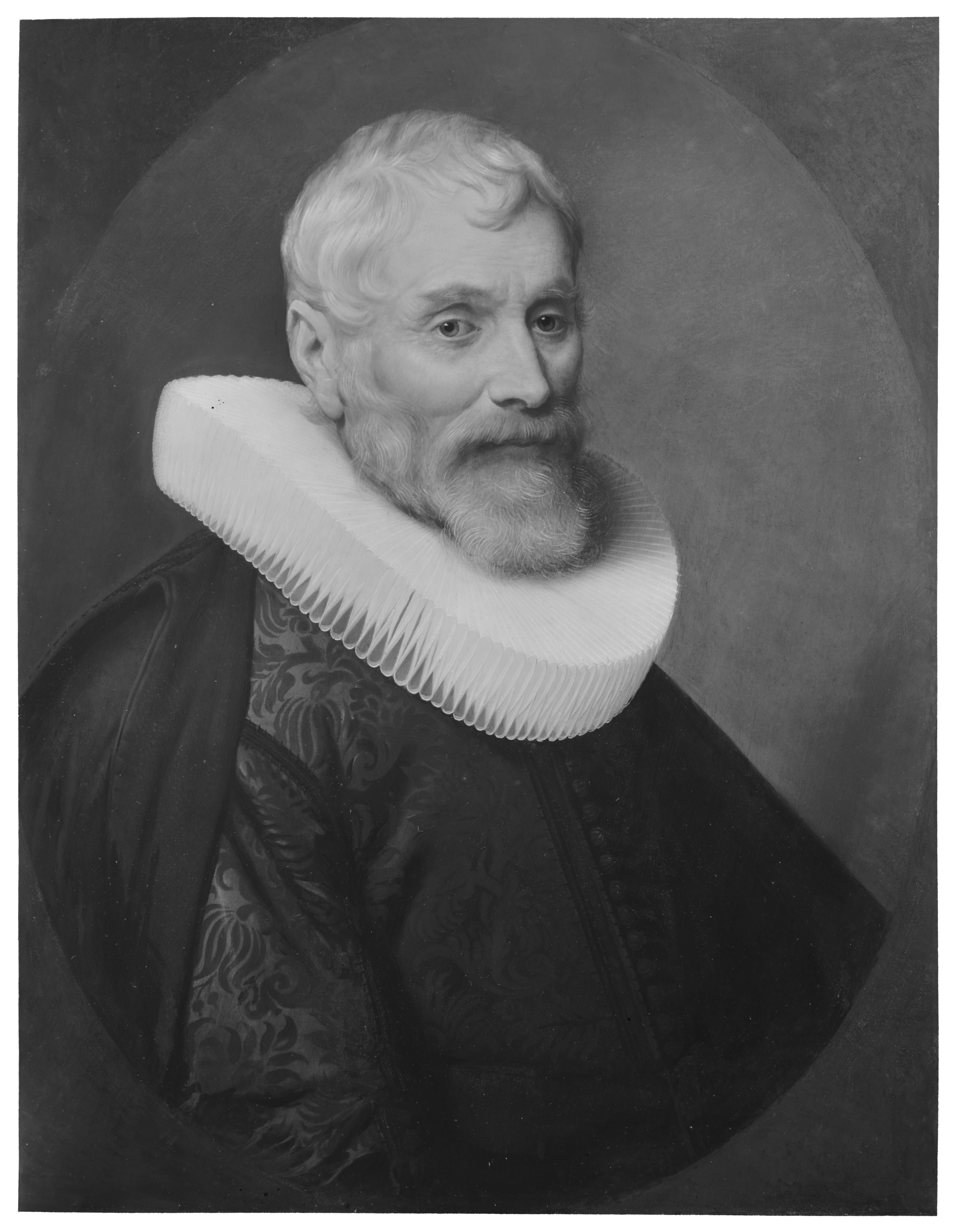

Regent and burgomaster of Amsterdam
- Reign: 1613–1638
- Predecessor: Reynier Pauw
- Successor: Andries Bicker
- Born: 1570; Emden
- Died: 6 October 1638 (aged 69); Amsterdam
- Burial: Oude Kerk, Amsterdam
- Spouse: Aaltje Boelens Loen
- Issue: Cornelis de Graeff (1599–1664); Dirk de Graeff (1601–1633); Agneta de Graeff van Polsbroek (1603–1656); Wendela de Graeff; Christina de Graeff (1609–1679); Andries de Graeff (1611–1678)
- House: De Graeff
- Father: Diederik Jansz. Graeff
- Mother: Agnies Pietresdr van Neck

Jacob Dircksz de Graeff, free lord of Zuid-Polsbroek (Emden 1571 – Amsterdam, 6 October 1638) was an illustrious member of the Dutch patrician De Graeff family. He belonged to States Faction and was an influential Amsterdam regent and burgomaster (mayor) of the Dutch Golden Age.

De Graeff was known for his "free-thinking", "republican" attitude but also for his "fame-seeking". Together with his nephew Andries Bicker, he campaigned for the recognition of the Remonstrants in Amsterdam. After the political collapse of Reynier Pauw in 1627, the management of the city government fell into the hands of the "Arminian clique" around De Graeff and Bicker, who contollef the city's politics in close cooperation to each other. This also gave new impetus to the republican "states party", which had been weakened since the murder of Johan van Oldenbarnevelt, and was able to determine Amsterdam politics up to the crisis of the Rampjaar in 1672. However, De Graeff was not a principled anti-orangist, because he honored the legacy of his father, Dirck Jansz Graeff, who was on friendly terms with William "the Silent" of Orange. His sons were influenced by their father's antagonistic attitude towards political issues. The proponents of the De Graeff family has shown they had an eye for national politics and tried to find some balance between the House of Orange and the Republicans. They were against too much influence of the church on political issues.

In addition to his political activities, De Graeff also conducted scientific experiments and research and ran a chemical laboratory. He maintained a close collaboration with Constantijn Huygens and via him also with René Descartes.

== Biography ==
=== Political background ===
During the Dutch Golden Age, the De Graeff and Bicker families were very critical of the Orange family's influence in the Netherlands. Together with the Republican-minded brothers and their cousins Andries, Cornelis and Jan Bicker, the family De Graeff strived for the abolition of stadtholdership. They desired the full sovereignty of the individual regions in a form in which the Republic of the United Seven Netherlands was not ruled by a single person. Instead of a sovereign (or stadtholder) the political and military power was lodged with the States General and with the regents of the cities in Holland. Jacob de Graeffs two sons Cornelis and Andries de Graeff became the strongest Dutch regents during the First Stadtholderless Period.

=== Family ===
Genealogy

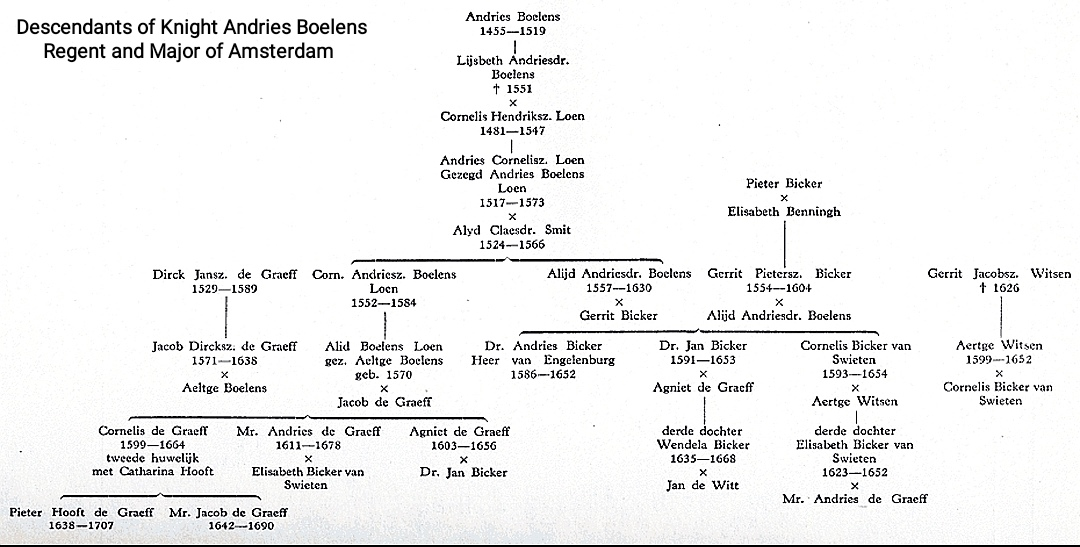
Overview of the personal family relationships of the Amsterdam oligarchy between the regent-dynasties Boelens Loen, De Graeff, Bicker (van Swieten), Witsen and Johan de Witt in the Dutch Golden Age

Jacob Dircksz de Graeff was born in Emden, Lower Saxony, the Exile of his parents Dirck Jansz Graeff and Agnies Pietresdr van Neck. He grew up in Emden and later in Amsterdam, at the house De Keyser in the Niezel, a small street not far from the Oude Kerk. In 1597 he married Aaltje Boelens Loen (27 February 1579 at Emden; † 29 August 1630 at Amsterdam), daughter of the politician Cornelis Andriesz Boelens Loen, descendant of Andries Boelens (1455–1519), a famous regent of Amsterdam. The couple had six children reaching adulthood:

- Cornelis de Graeff (1599–1664), regent and burgomaster of Amsterdam, Dutch statesman
- Dirk de Graeff (1601–1637), Vroedschap and Schepen of Amsterdam
- Agneta de Graeff van Polsbroek (1603–1656), married her full cousin Jan Bicker; her daughter Wendela Bicker married Johan de Witt, while her daughter Jacoba Bicker married her full cousin Pieter de Graeff
- Wendela de Graeff (1607–1652), married to Willem Schrijver (son of the important philologist Petrus Scriverius), painted by Rembrandt for his painting Jacob Blessing the Sons of Joseph
- Christina de Graeff (1609–1679), lady of Engelenburg (heiress to her uncle Pieter Dircksz Graeff) married in 1642 with her full cousin Jacob Bicker and in 1648 to Pieter Trip
- Andries de Graeff (1611–1678), regent and burgomaster of Amsterdam, Dutch statesman

==== Feudality ====
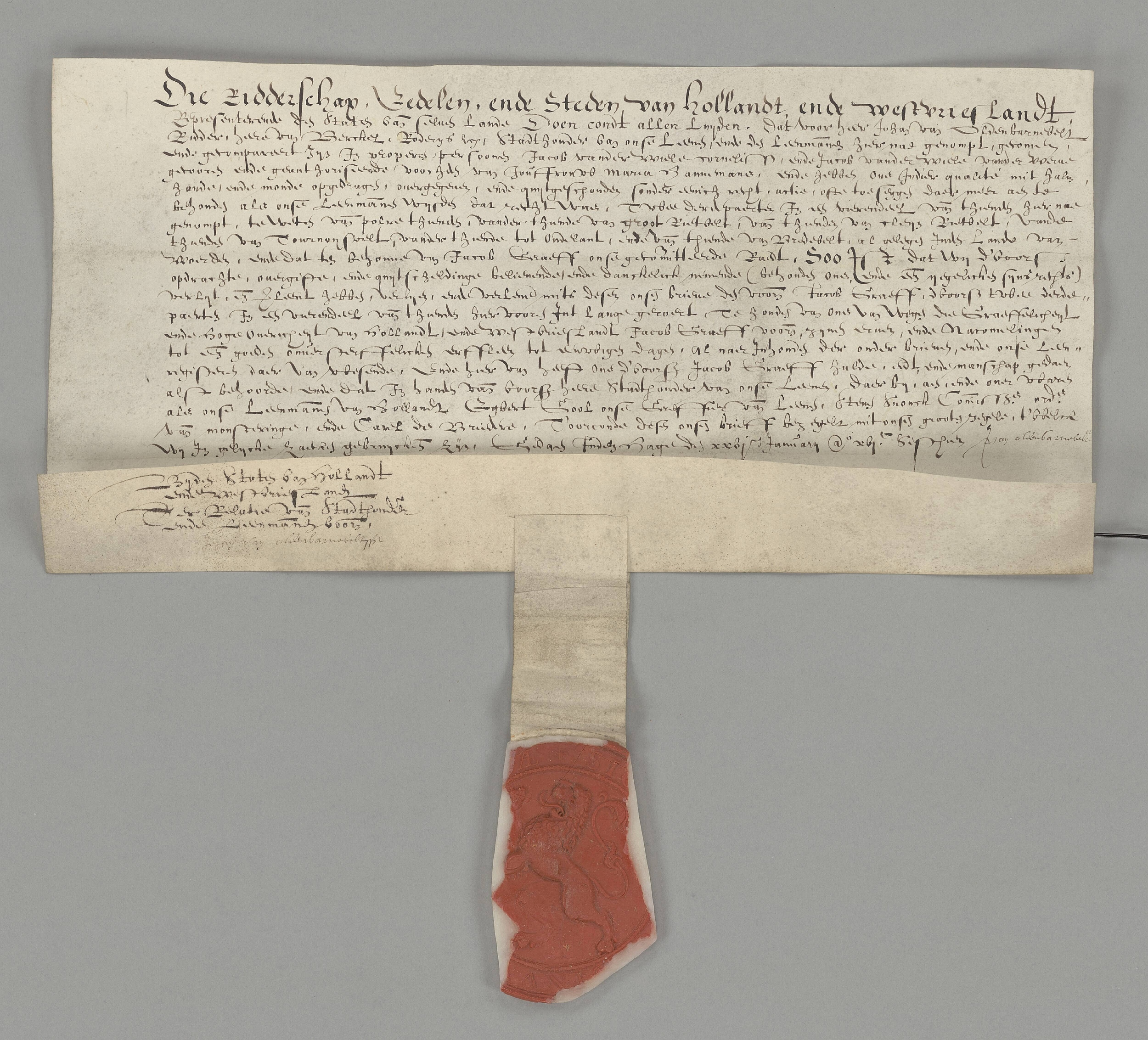
Deed of Fief of the States of Holland for the tithe in Rietveld, Poldertienden (Oliviersblok), Groot-Rietveld, Klein-Rietveld, Tournooisveld, Oudeland and Bredeveld (Bredeveld) in 1616

On September 18, 1610, Jacob Dircksz de Graeff acquired the High Lordship of Zuid-Polsbroek from Charles of Aremberg, which was freely inheritable and sellable as an allod. Their acquisition increased the reputation and contributed to the aristocratization of the family, in which De Graeff and his heirs could be addressed as Vrijheer(en) van Zuid-Polsbroek ever since. De Graeff was also from 1604 Ambachtsheer (Lord of the manor) of Sloten, Sloterdijk, Nieuwer-Amstel, Osdorp and Amstelveen, but not the owner of these glories. Rather, the city of Amsterdam bought them in 1529 from Reinoud III van Brederode, and then gave it in fief to one of their council members. He was also chieflandholder of the Zijpe- en Hazepolder, Watergraafs- and Wiemermeer. He also had the tithe in fief at Rietveld, Poldertienden (Oliviersblok), Groot-Rietveld, Klein-Rietveld, Tournooisveld, Oudeland and Bredeveld (Bredeveld).

==== Coat of arms ====
Coat of arms

Ancient coat of arms (variant divided and not quarterd)

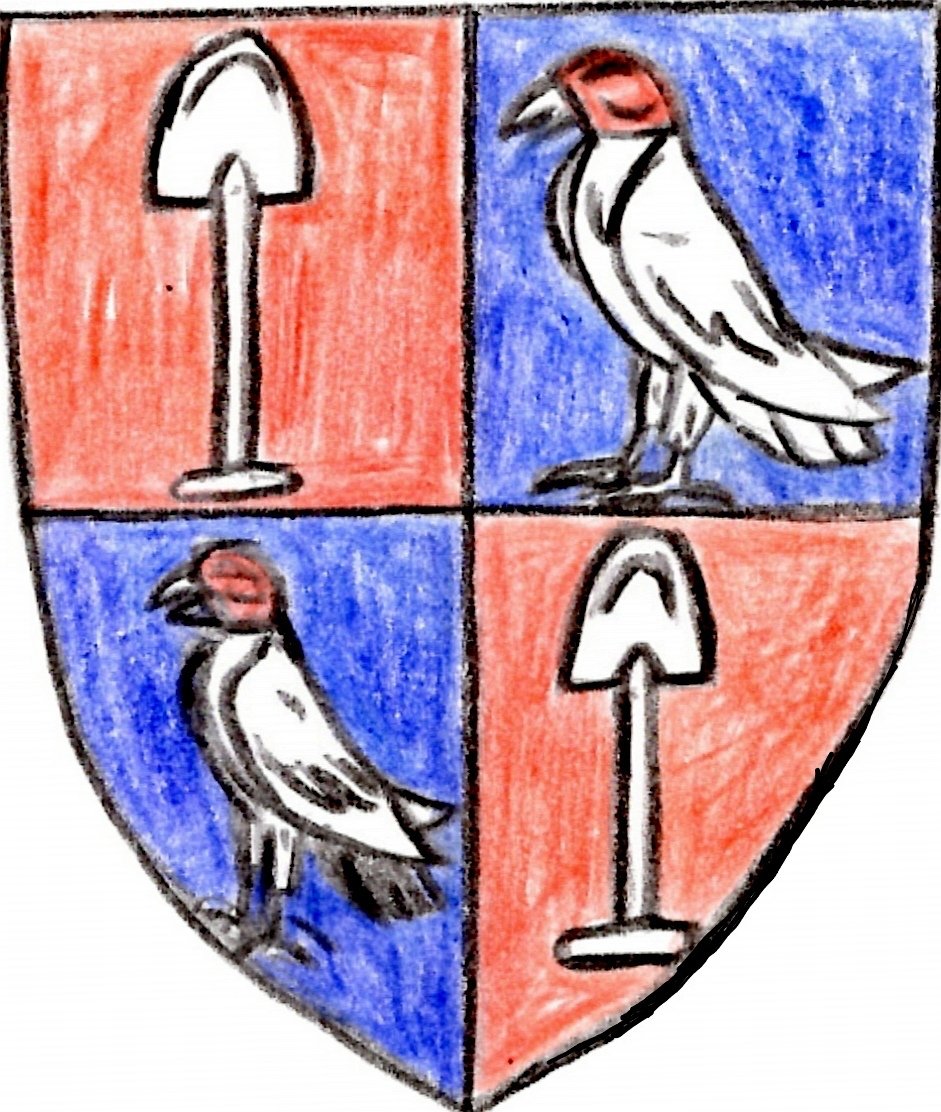
Personal coat of arms (shown without the heart shield who shows the three silver rhombuses on red of the Free Lordship of Zuid-Polsbroek)

Jacob Dircksz de Graeff's coat of arms of origin was possibly still divided (and not quartered) and showed the following symbols:

- field 1 the silver shovel on a red background of their paternal ancestors, the Herren von Graben
- field 2 it shows a silver falcon on a blue background. The origin of the falcon lies in the possession of the Valckeveen estate (later the Valckenburg estate) in Gooiland
- helmet covers in red and silver
- helm adornment shows an upright silver spade with ostrich feathers (Herren von Graben)

The personal coat of arms of Jacob Dircksz de Graeff (since 1610?) is quartered with a heart shield and shows the following symbols:

- heart shield shows the three silver rhombuses on red (originally from the family Van Woerdern van Vliet) of the High Lordship Zuid-Polsbroek
- field 1 (left above) shows the silver shovel on red of their paternal ancestors, the Herren von Graben
- field 2 (right above) shows a silver falcon on a blue background. The origin of the falcon lies in the possession of the Valckeveen estate (later the Valckenburg estate) in Gooiland
- field 3 (left below), same as field 2
- field 4 (right below), same as field 1
- helmet covers in red and silver
- helm adornment shows an upright silver spade with ostrich feathers (Herren von Graben)
- motto: MORS SCEPTRA LIGONIBUS AEQUAT (DEATH MAKES SEPTRES AND HOES EQUAL)
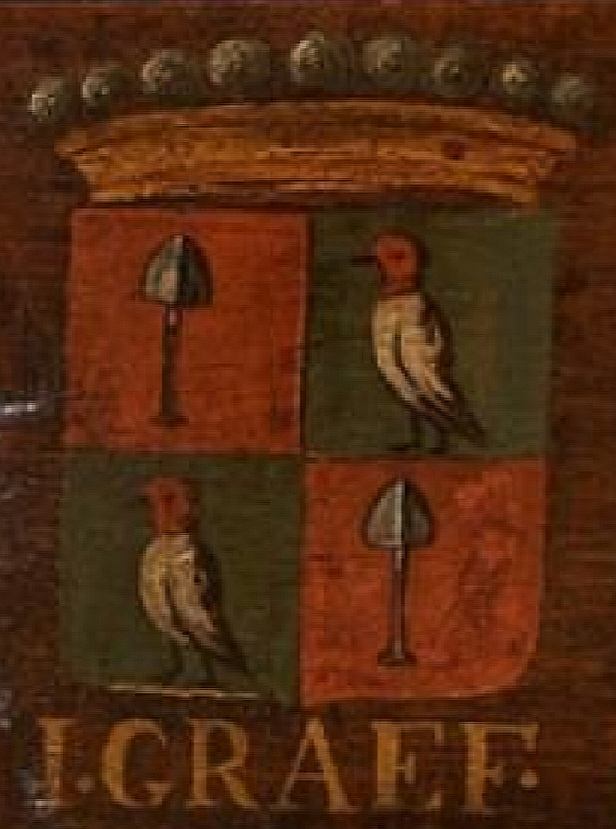
Ancient coat of arms Jacob Dircksz de Graeff quartered

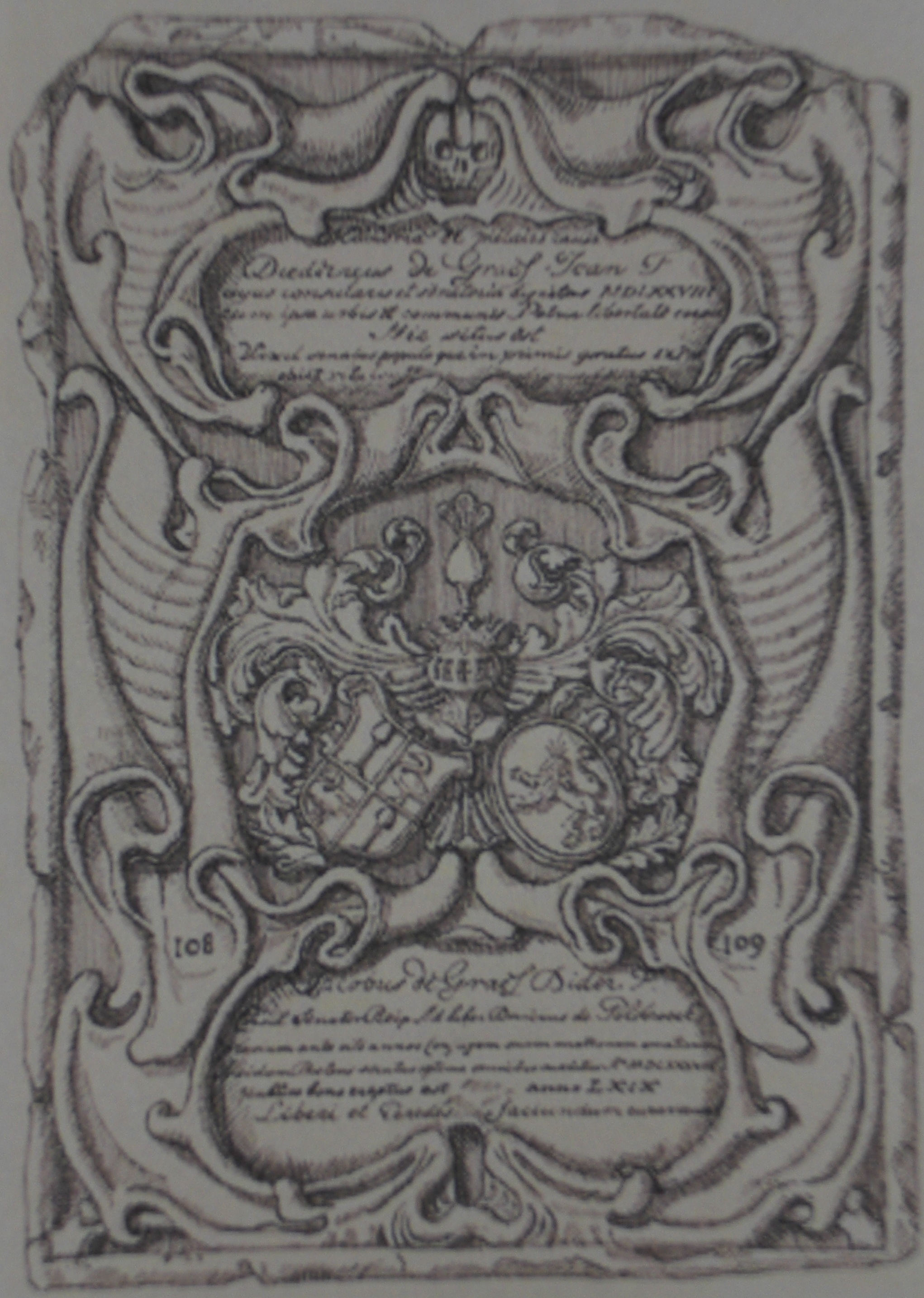
Gravestone of Jacob and his father Diederik Jansz. Graeff at Amsterdam's Oude Kerk

=== Career ===
==== First political period ====
After the death of De Graeff's father in 1589, his father's friend Cornelis Andriesz Boelens Loen - whose daughter Aaltje he later married - acted as his provider. Jacob Dircksz de Graeff studied Classical language at Leiden University. During his student days he lived in the house of professor Rudolf Snellius. In 1591 he undertook a grand tour of France, Italy and Germany with his friend Justus Lipsius and then lived in Geneva for three years in the house of the Calvinist preacher Giovanni Diodati. In 1597 De Graeff returned to Amsterdam and in the following year he became Schepen (alderman) and from 1603 a member of the Vroedschap. The following year he became ambachtsheer of Amstelveen, Nieuwer-Amstel, Sloten, Sloterdijk and Osdorp on behalf of the city of Amsterdam. After his death, his son Cornelis de Graeff received this fiefdoms. As early as 1610, De Graeff brought the Protestant preacher Johannes Cornelisz Sylvius to Amsterdam. In 1611 he was also elected one of the four burgomasters (mayor) of Amsterdam for the first time. That year he was also present at the meeting of Prince Maurits of Oranje and Frederick Hendrik of Oranje in the Beemster area newly retaken from the Spanish. In 1612 he became a colonel in the Amsterdam Civil Guard. When the Remonstrant Simon Episcopius was summoned before the mayors in 1613, De Graeff was one of his most ardent opponents, although he later maintained an intimate relationship with him and the Remonstrants. He was friends with burgomaster Cornelis Hooft, and competed with him on a committee on the city of Amsterdam's expansion plans against "self-seeking" land speculators Frans Hendricksz Oetgens van Waveren and Bartholt Cromhout. De Graeff himself owned much land within the city and ensured that his land was conveniently located for the new roads and canals in the new Jordaan area. At this time, a powerful Calvinist faction under Reynier Pauw crystallized in the Vroedschap, to which De Graeff and his ally Hooft kept their distance, and thus diminished their own influence.

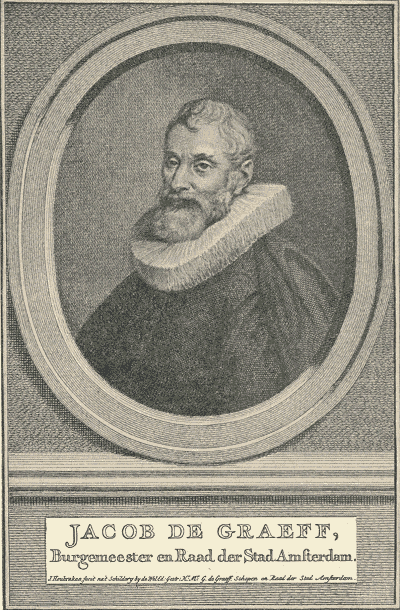
Jacob Dircksz de Graeff, engraving by Jacobus Houbraken (18th century)

During his councillorship in the States of Holland and West Friesland (1615–1617) De Graeff get sympathy with Johan van Oldenbarnevelt. There he became acquainted with the preacher Johannes Uytenbogaert and adopted the thesis of the Remonstrants as his own. This attitude brought him politically to the side of the state advocate Van Oldenbarnevelt and Hugo Grotius, whose socio-political position he prolonged as the local representative of Amsterdam. The city was one of the Holland cities whose regents were partisans of the Remonstrants and had agitated for the Sharp Resolution of 1617 which authorized city governments to raise private armies, called waardgelders. The Counter-Remonstrants (enemies of the Remonstrants) opposed this, and the stadtholder, Maurice of Nassau viewed this policy as a challenge to his authority as commander-in-chief of the States Army. On 23 August 1618, by order of the States-General and forced by François van Aerssen, Oldenbarnevelt and his chief supporters such as Grotius, Gilles van Ledenberg, Rombout Hogerbeets were arrested. De Graeff was therefore expelled from the government after Oldenbarnevelt's disempowerment and his subsequent beheading in 1618, on the initiative of the stadholder Maurits of Orange and the Amsterdam regent Reynier Pauw. His place had been taken by Pauw's protegee, Albert Burgh. De Graeff lost his political position in the government for some years.

==== Natural sciences ====
After his interim retirement from politics, De Graeff dedicated himself to scientific experiments and research. He ran a chemical laboratory in Amsterdam together with his friend Pieter Jansz Hooft. There they tried to invent a perpetual motion machine. There are claims that Cornelis Drebbel presented this device to the court of the English King James I and it was accidentally broken by the queen. In the field of science and natural history, De Graeff and Hooft maintained a close collaboration with Constantijn Huygens and via him also with René Descartes. He was also a scholar of the Amsterdam Latin School.

==== Second political period ====
After the death of Maurits of Oranje in 1625 and the political collapse of the orangist Reynier Pauw in 1627 Jacob Dircksz de Graeff returned to power again. In 1628 he was re-elected burgomaster and in 1630 re-elected Vroedschap. During the late 1620s and the 1630s he controlled the city's politics in close cooperation with his nephew Andries Bicker. Together with Bicker he was also the leader of the Arminian faction of the city. In contrast to Pauw, both took a liberal stance. In the early 1630s, the state party, weakened since Oldenbarnevelt's execution, was revived by them. Together, De Graeff and Andries Bicker led the city to its temporary peak of power in the years that followed. Both were remonstrants and helped the religious minority to gain relative recognition. De Graeff was also known as a very liberal ruler who did not hide his religious convictions and republican sentiments. Altogether he was burgomaster of Amsterdam six times. During this time, De Graeff was repeatedly offered the post of Gecommitteerde Rad der Holland und West-Friesland in The Hague, which he never accepted. In 1631, he initiated the political career of his protégé Joan Huydecoper van Maarsseveen at the Vroedschaper elections. Furthermore, in 1632 he was appointed to the hoofdingeland van de Watergraafs- en Wienermeer.

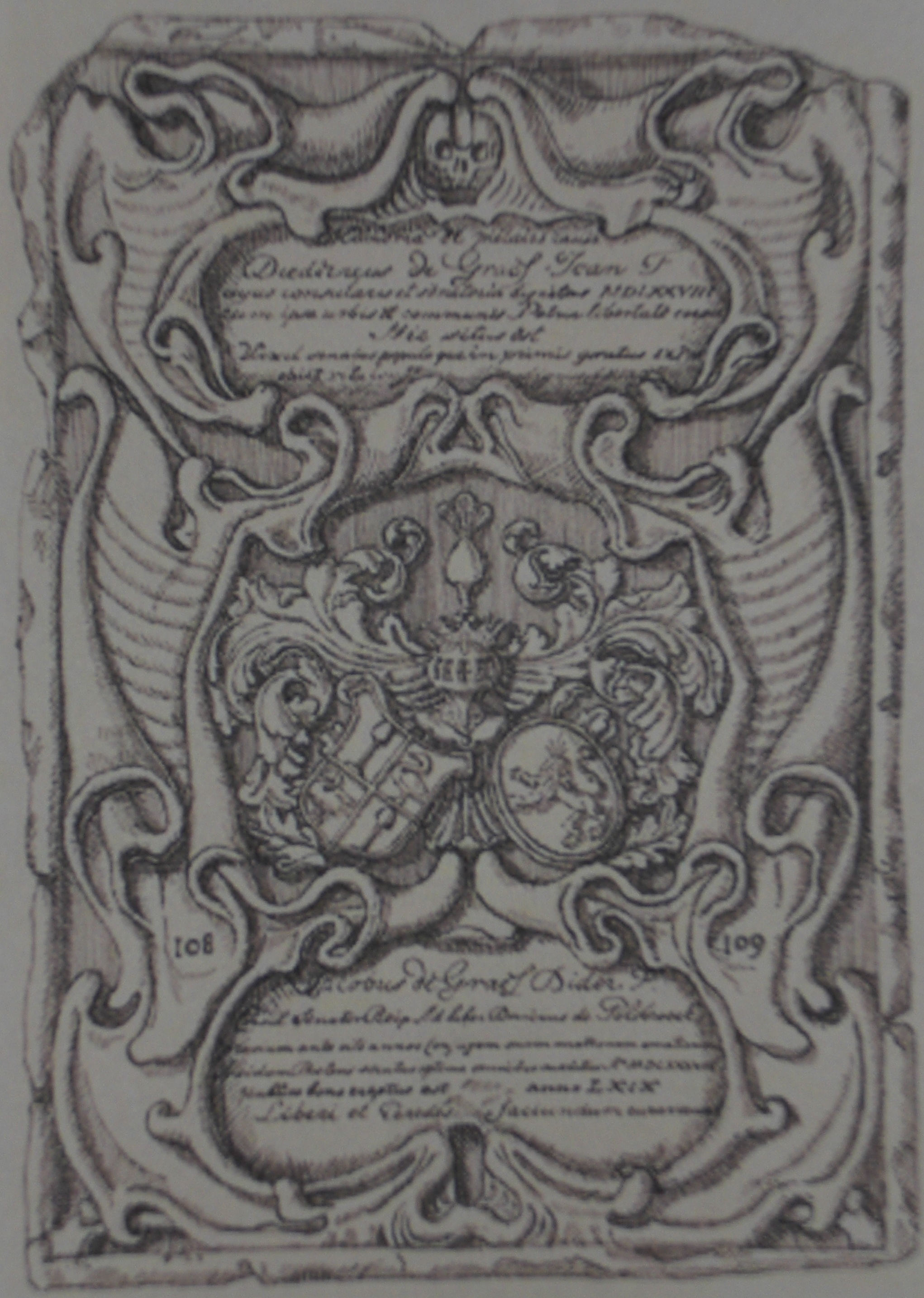
Jacob Dircksz de Graeff's tombstone in Amsterdam's Oude Kerk

Jacob Dircksz de Graeff was one of the wealthiest residents of Amsterdam; his cash assets at the time of death totaled 270,000 guilders. He died in Amsterdam and his tomb chapel can be found in the Oude Kerk floor, plots number 108 and 109. The poet and writer Joost van den Vondel wrote an obituary for him with "De titel maakt alleen geen Graef". After his death his son Cornelis de Graeff and his nephews, the hardcore republican-minded brothers Andries and Cornelis Bicker took over his role on the council. His granddaughter Wendela Bicker married the important statesman Grand pensionary Johan de Witt.

== Trivia ==
- Jacob Dircksz de Graeff is also portrayed as a 'goed schutter en groot liefhebber van de jacht' (good marksman and a great lover of hunting) who also kept a 'tal van jachthonden' (a multitude of hunting dogs). Furthermore, the Digitale Bibliotheek voor de Nederlandse Letteren reports that De Graeff "reed veel te Paard en hanteerde met vaardigheid den degen" (practiced a lot and tried to improve his fluency with the dagger)
- In The Hague and Amstelveen there are two Jacob de Graef(f)laans named after him
- Dirck Jansz Graeff play a role in the historic roman Krone der Welt by Sabine Weiß.

Jacob Dircksz de Graeff House De Graeff Born: 1569/1571 Died: 6 October 1636
Preceded by Charles de Ligne, 2nd Prince of Arenberg	Free Lord of Zuid-Polsbroek; 1610–1638	Succeeded by Cornelis de Graeff
Preceded by Gerrit Bicker and City of Amsterdam	Lord of the manor of Sloten, Nieuwer-Amstel, Osdorp and Amstelveen; 1604–1624/1638	Succeeded by Andries Bicker and Cornelis de Graeff

== Literature ==
- Elias, Johan E. (1903–1905) De vroedschap van Amsterdam, 1578-1795, p. 266
- Lademacher, Horst Phönix aus der Asche? Politik und kultur der niederländischen Republik im Europa des 17. Jahrhunderts, Münster (2007, Waxmann Verlag), p. 228
- Israel, Jonathan I. (1995) The dutch Republic - Its Rise, Greatness, and Fall - 1477-1806, Clarendon Press, Oxford, ISBN 978-0-19-820734-4
- Burke, P. (1994) Venice and Amsterdam. A study of seventeenth-century élites.
