= Dirk de Graeff =

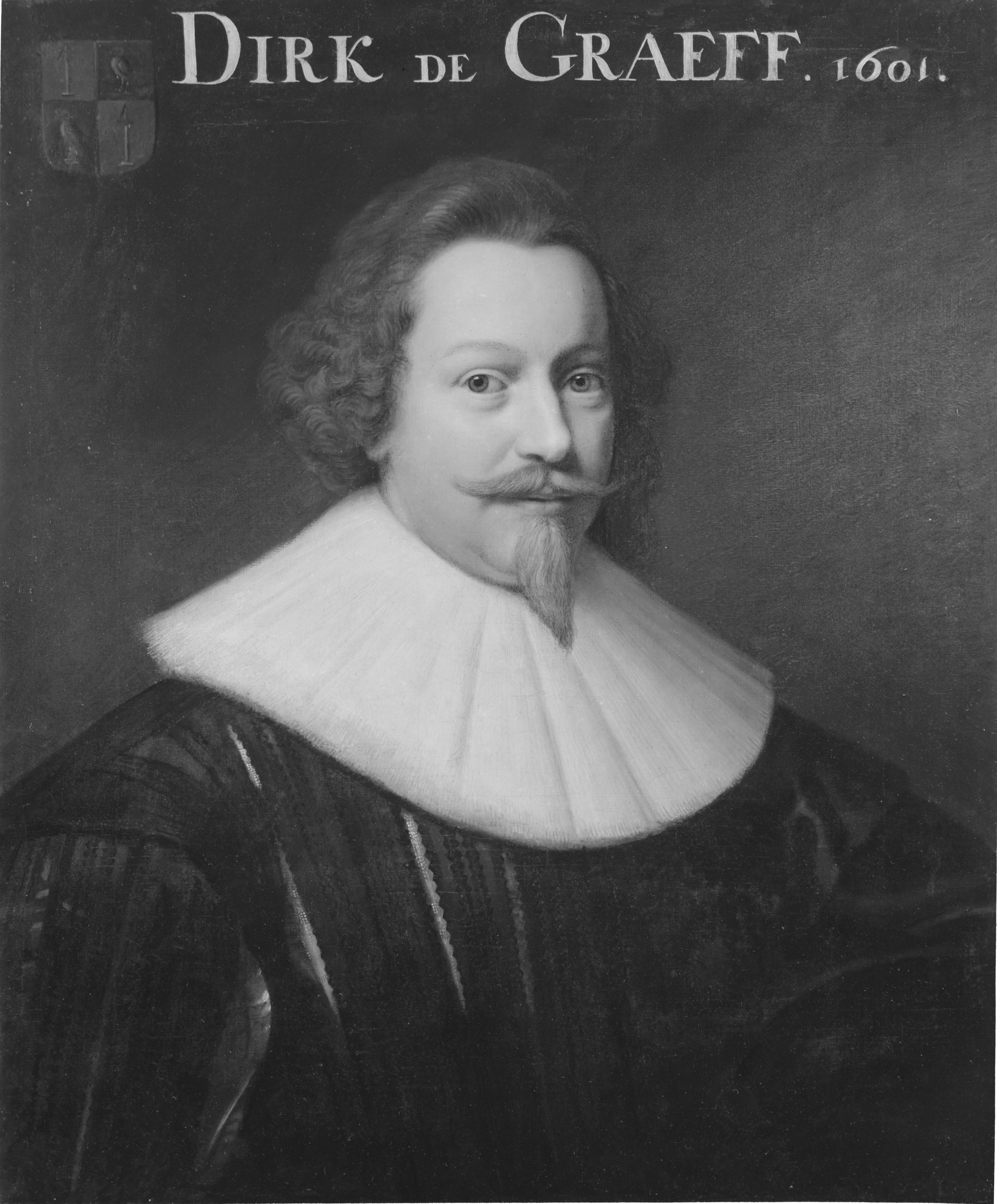
Dirk de Graeff

Dirk de Graeff (Amsterdam, February 1, 1601 - April 26, 1637 ibid) was a Dutch 17th-century regent who belonged to the States Party.

== Biography ==
Dirk was a scion of the De Graeff family and son of Amsterdam regent and burgomaster Jacob Dircksz de Graeff and Aeltje Boelens Loen (1579-1630), daughter of Cornelis Andriesz Boelens Loen. His godparents were Pieter Dircksz Graeff and Weyntje Dircksz (de) Graeff, both siblings of his father. He grew up in the house De Keyser in the Niezel street. Like his older brother Cornelis de Graeff he studied law in Leiden and received his doctorate there. In 1626 he undertook together with his brother Cornelis and Willem Nooms, Lord van Aarlanderveen (he was the father of an illegitimate daughter named Margaretha, whom he, together with Dirk's sister Wendela de Graeff had) an extensive Cavaliersreise, which took them to Paris, Orléans, Blois, Nantes, La Rochelle, Poitiers and in 1628 brought it back to the capital. There they were warmly received by the then Swedish ambassador Hugo de Groot (Latinized Hugo Grotius). In the same year the three young men returned to their home town via Flanders.

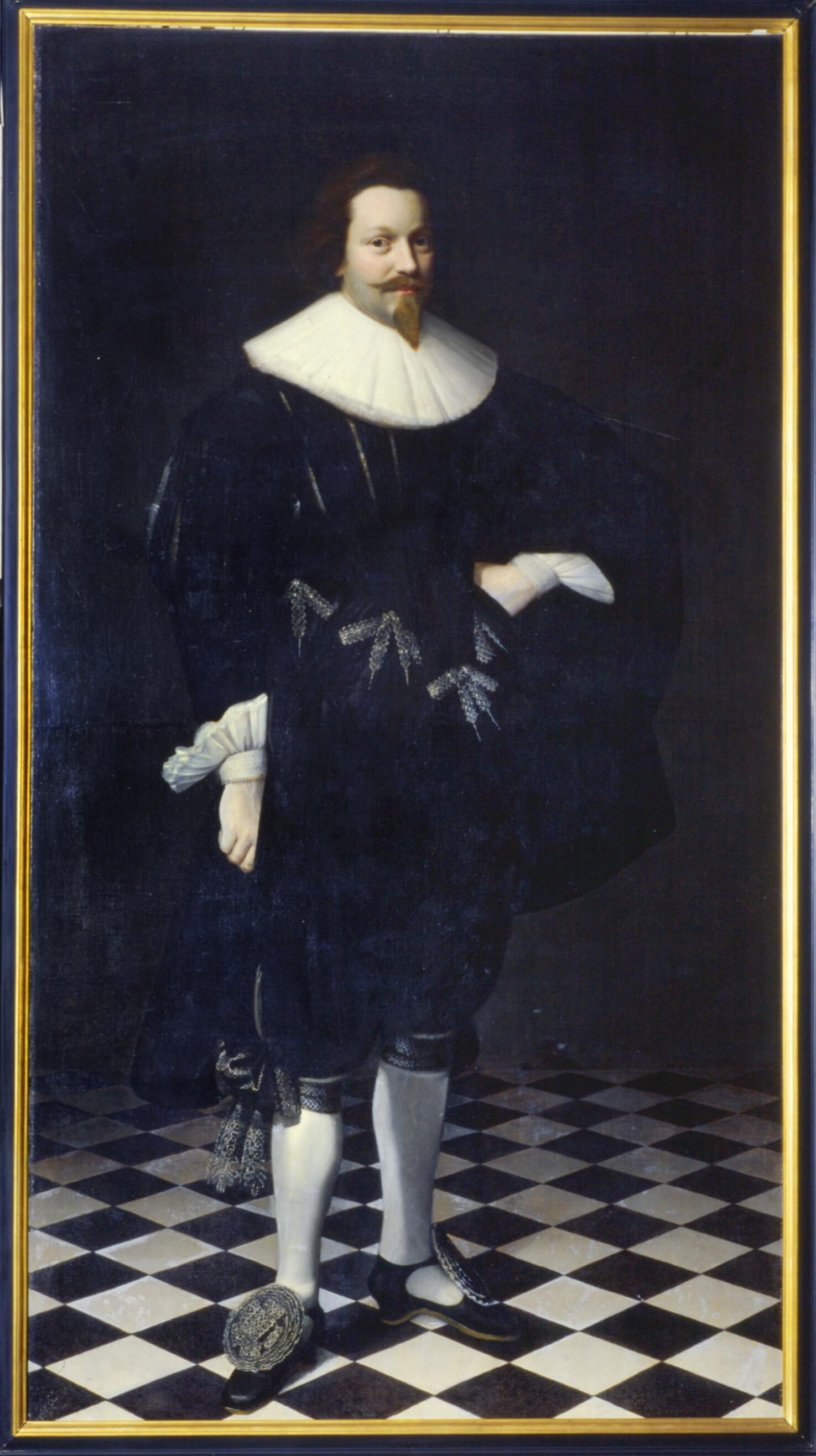
Wedding portrait of Dirk de Graeff, painted by Nicolaes Eliaszoon Pickenoy (1630)

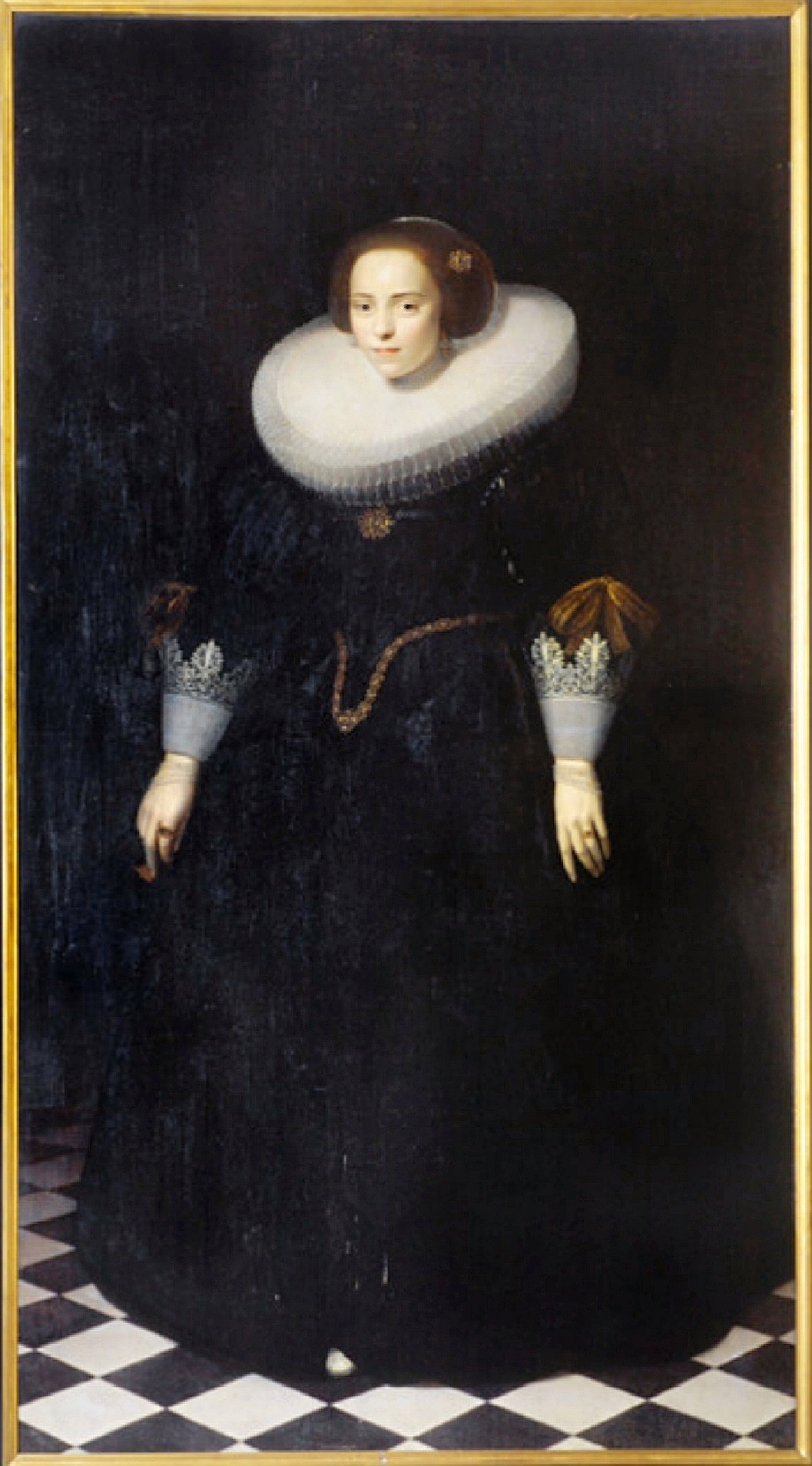
Wedding portrait of Eva Bicker, painted by Nicolaes Eliaszoon Pickenoy (1630)

On February 5, 1630, Dirk de Graeff married his second cousin Eva Bicker (1609-1655), daughter of Jacob Jacobsz Bicker (1581–1626), advisor of Amsterdam, and Anna Roelofsdr de Vrij (1589-1626). Her father was first cousin with statesman and Amsterdam burgomaster Andries Bicker and Dirk de Graeff himself was a full cousin of the Bicker brothers around Andries. In 1631 he was appointed commissioner of Amsterdam and member of the Amsterdam Vroedschap and in 1632 he became Schepen. He belonged to the powerful states-oriented Bicker-De Graeff faction of the city, led by his father Jacob and his cousin Andries Bicker.

De Graeff and his wife Eva Bicker were painted by Nicolaes Eliasz. Pickenoy. These are two unsigned works identified by their similarity to a painted portrait of De Graeff by an unknown painter. He also appears as a lieutenant in a 1633 painting by Thomas de Keyser of the Citizens Guard (Civic guardsmen from the company of captain Jacob Symonszn de Vries and lieutenant Dirck Jacobszn de Graeff) which is in the Amsterdam Historical Museum. De Graeff died childless in his native hometown Amsterdam in 1637 and was buried in the Oude Kerk in Amsterdam. His wife remarried Frederik Alewijn in 1640.

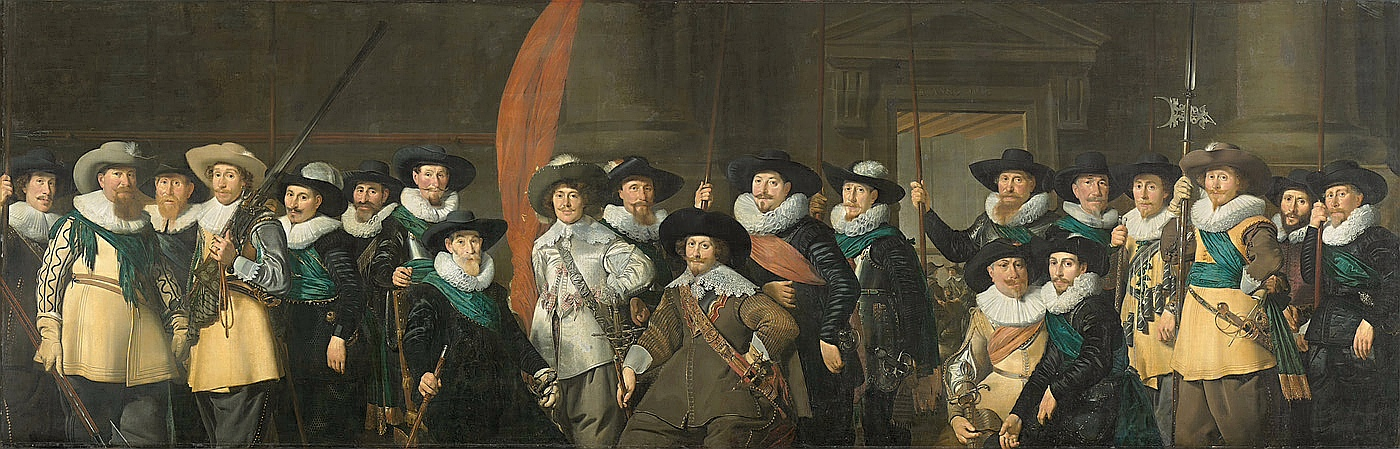
Civic guardsmen from the company of captain Jacob Symonszn de Vries (seated right) and lieutenant Dirck Jacobszn de Graeff (seated left), painted by Thomas de Keyser (1633)

== Coat of arms ==
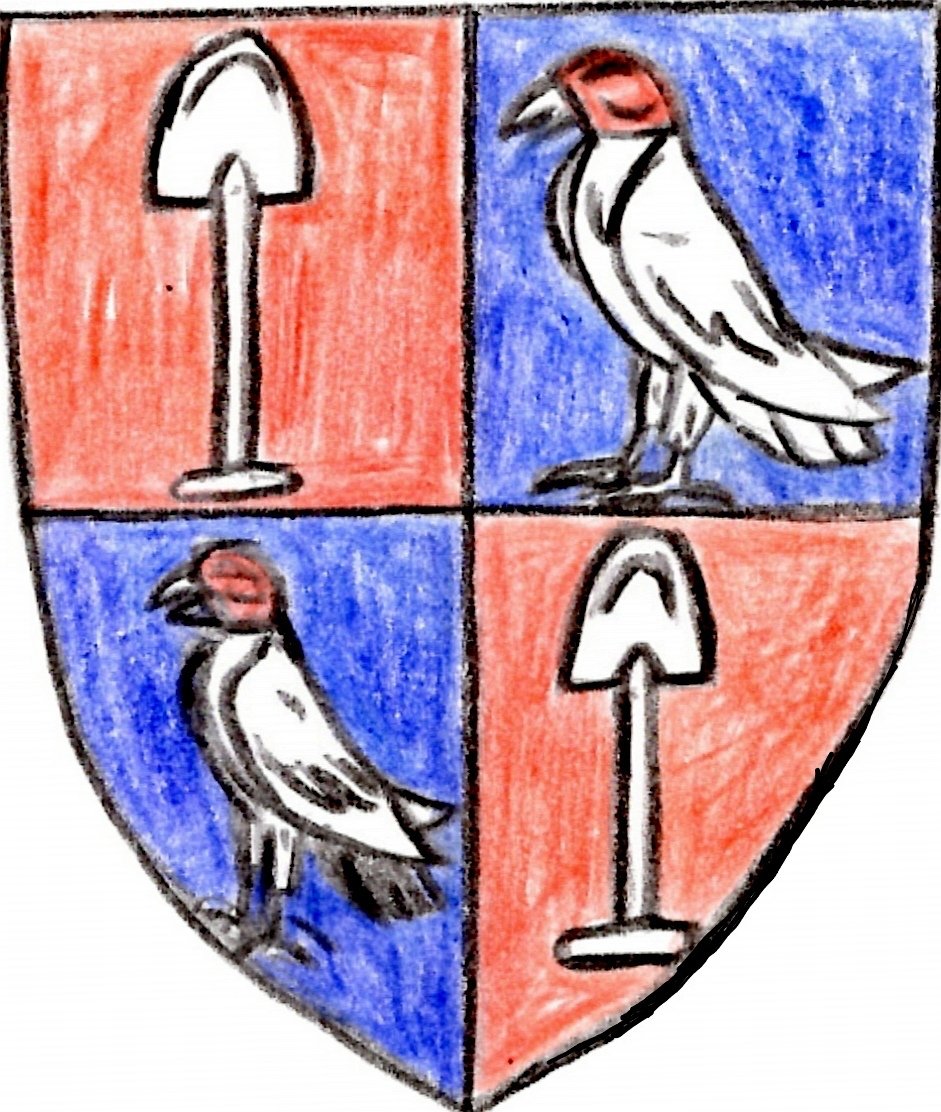
Coat of arms

Dirk de Graeff's coat of arms was quartered and showed the following symbols:

- field 1 (left above) the silver shovel on a red background of their paternal ancestors, the Herren von Graben
- field 2 (right above) it shows a silver falcon on a blue background. The origin of the falcon lies in the possession of the Valckeveen estate (later the Valckenburg estate) in Gooiland
- field 3 (left below), same as field 2
- field 4 (right below), same as field 1
- helmet covers in red and silver
- helm adornment shows an upright silver spade with ostrich feathers (Herren von Graben)
- motto: MORS SCEPTRA LIGONIBUS AEQUAT (DEATH MAKES SEPTRES AND HOES EQUAL)
