= Albert Burgh =

Dutch politician (1593–1647)

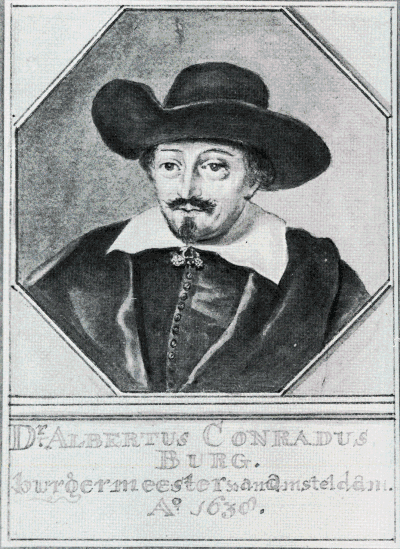
Albert Burgh in 1638

Albert Coenraadsz Burgh (1593 – 24 December 1647) was a Dutch physician who was mayor of Amsterdam and a councillor in the Admiralty of Amsterdam.

== Biography ==
Burgh was born into a rich brewer's family. He studied medicine in Leiden in 1614 and became a doctor in 1618 in Amsterdam. In the same year, after Johan van Oldenbarnevelts Fall and beheading, the Calvinist Burgh was appointed councilor by Reynier Pauw to replace the pro-Remonstrant Jacob Dircksz de Graeff in the Amsterdam city council. He changed his view within a couple of years, paying a fine for the famous Dutch poet Vondel. Vondel had gotten into trouble because of his play Palamedes, in which he was recalling the beheading of Oldenbarneveldt.

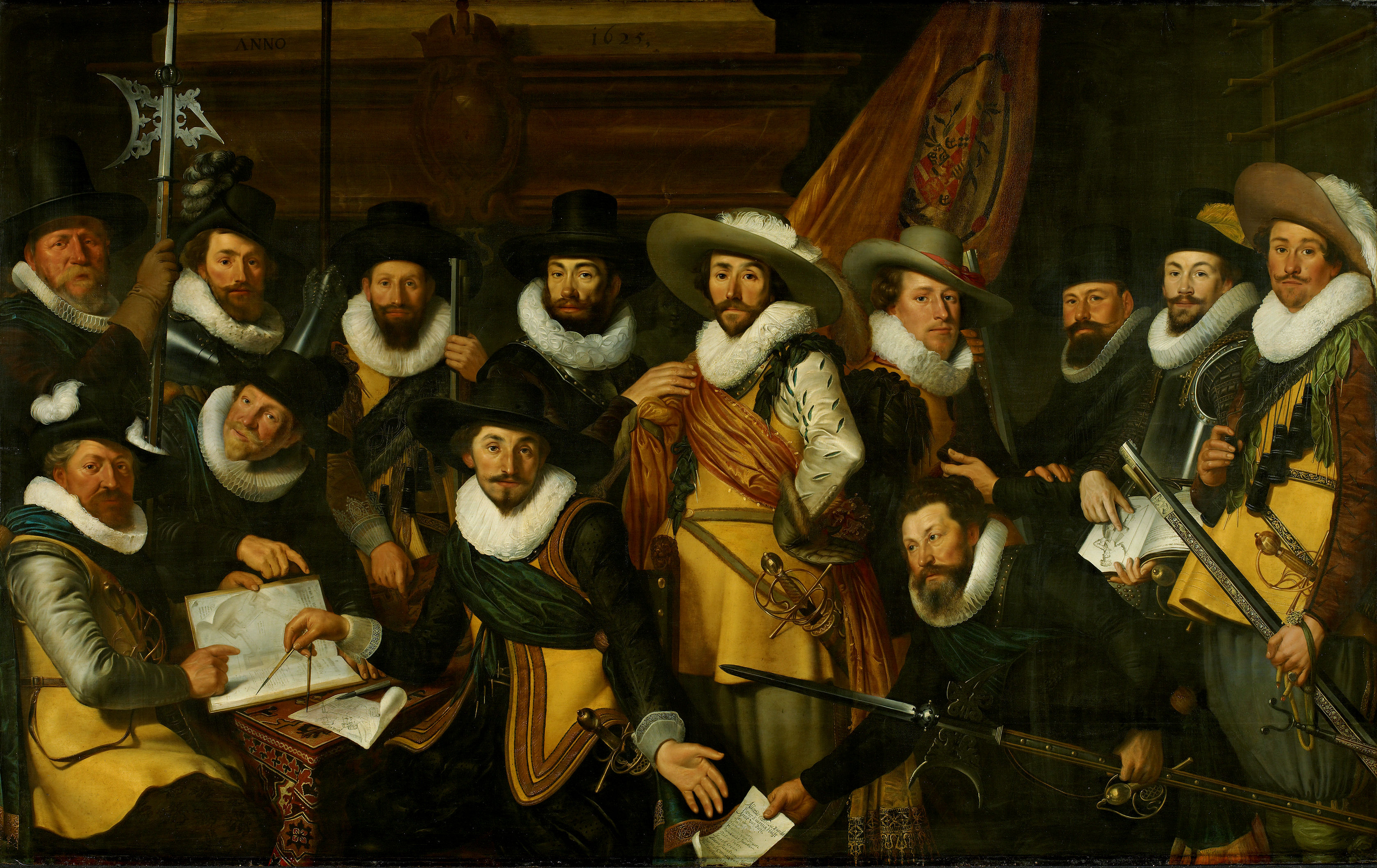
Civic guardsmen of the company of Captain Burgh and Lieutenant Hulft by Werner van den Valckert, 1625. Burgh is the man sitting on the far left side

Around 1624, Burgh became one of the managers of the Dutch West India Company and owned land on the New Jersey side opposite the river Delaware. In 1632, Albert Burgh sold his land in Rensselaerswyck, Albany, to the main investor Kiliaen van Rensselaer.

At the solemn entry of Maria de Medici into Amsterdam in 1638, he and the burgomaster and regents, Andries Bicker, Pieter Hasselaer, Antonie Oetgens van Waveren and Abraham Boom welcomed her in the name of the city's government. Burgh offered De Medici a meal with rice, in those days very exotic and hardly known to Europeans. He sold her a famous silver rosary, captured in 1629 by Piet Hein in Brazil. In 1644 he became a manager of the Admiralty of Amsterdam.

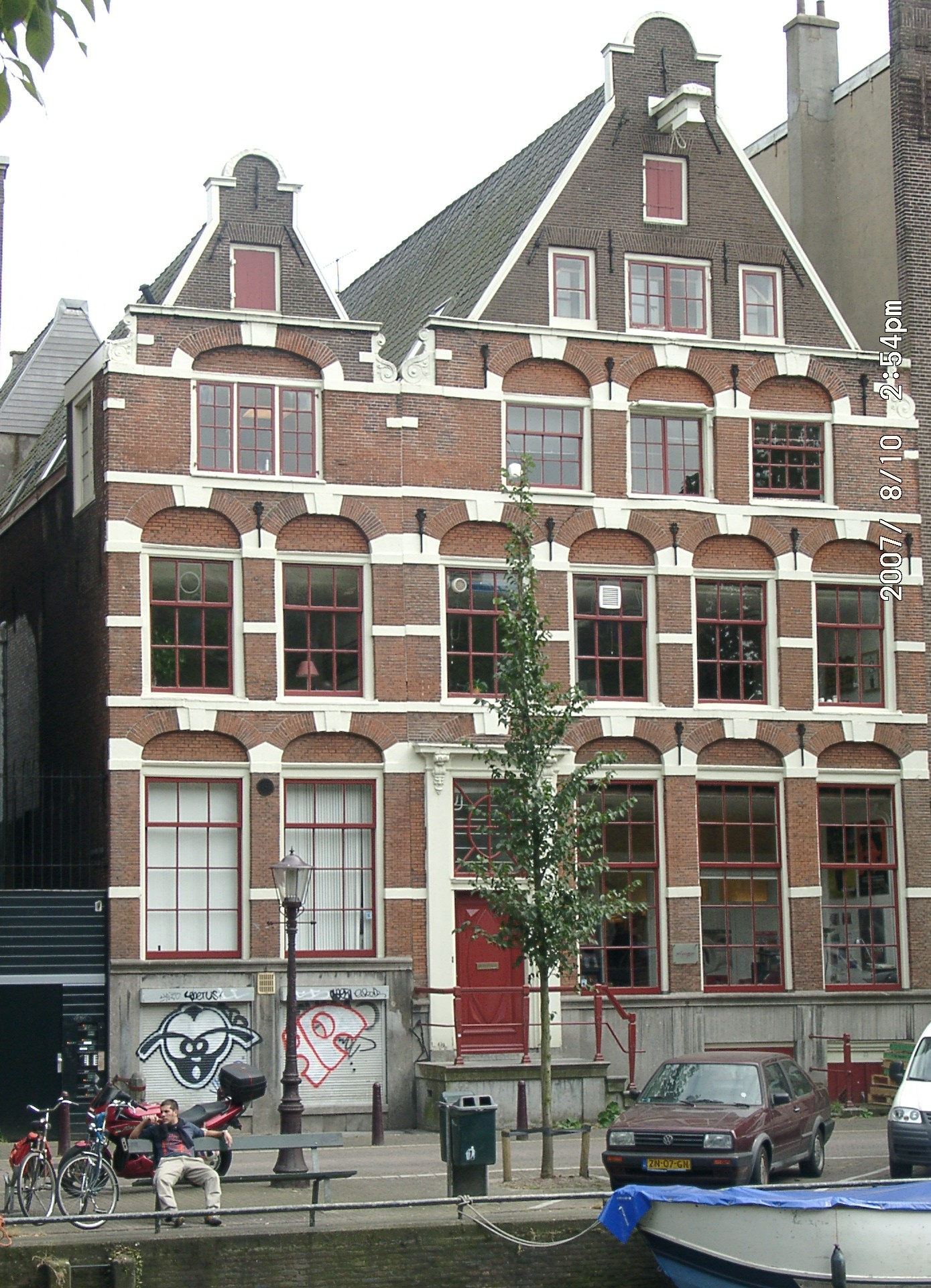
The house of Albert Burgh on Kloveniersburgwal

During his lifetime he visited Russia twice (1629 and 1647), in order to improve trade relations. Both times he entered the country in Arkhangelsk. Burgh died on Christmas Eve in Novgorod. The corpse was returned to Amsterdam. Dirck Tulp, the son of the famous surgeon Nicolaes Tulp, who had accompanied him on his trip to Russia, married his daughter. In 1652, Fort Coenraadsburg on the Gold Coast was named after him.

== Offspring ==
One of Albert Burgh's grandsons, also named Albert Burgh, was a Franciscan in Rome and argued with his former teacher Baruch Spinoza in some famous letters; another grandson of Albert Burgh was the mayor of Amsterdam Coenraad van Beuningen.

== Sources ==
- Elias, J.E. (1903–1905, reprint 1963) De vroedschap van Amsterdam 1578-1795, two volumes.
- KNAW
