= Dirck Tulp =

Dutch businessman (1624–1682)

Potter's portrait of Tulp in 1653

Dirck or Diederik Tulp (1624–1682) was the son of the surgeon professor Nicolaes Tulp and involved in the Dutch East India Company and the Civic guard. Dirck Tulp visited Russia with his father-in-law; he was painted in 1653 by Paulus Potter.

== Life ==
In 1647, Dirck accompanied Albert Burgh, son of a brewer and former mayor of Amsterdam, on his mission to Russia, to build up trade connections, especially in grain. Dirck Tulp married Anna Burgh in 1650, daughter of the late Burgh. The couple lived initially on Kloveniersburgwal 65, a building given to Anna by her family. This house had been used for dying silk since 1603. The silk was imported from Persia, and shipped, either through Arkhangelsk or the Strait of Gibraltar. A pair of fashionable Flemish ladies had headed it, its activities occurring in its light and airy attics. Over the years, the operation was largely moved to the Jordaan. When Tulp and his wife began building-work in 1652, they had the building embellished with stucco and the floor laid with marble. The Kloveniersburgwal was an attractive site for the rich, being close to the nerve center of the VOC, in which Tulp was appointed as delegate.

Anna Burgh also owned a summer residence (hofstede) at the Amstel, named "Klein Kostverloren", that was renamed "Tulpenburgh" (combining both family names). They used their summer residence, like many families at the time, to get out of town during the summer, to avoid the urban stench, noise and the plague that was decimating the cities population during that period.

In 1652, Paulus Potter came to Amsterdam on Nicolaes Tulp's invitation. Dirck received a painting, that was initially meant to be for someone else – Potter only repainted the head. Around the same time, his half-sister Margaretha Tulp broke off an engagement with Johan de Witt, one of the most influential Dutch politicians of that time, and married Jan Six instead.

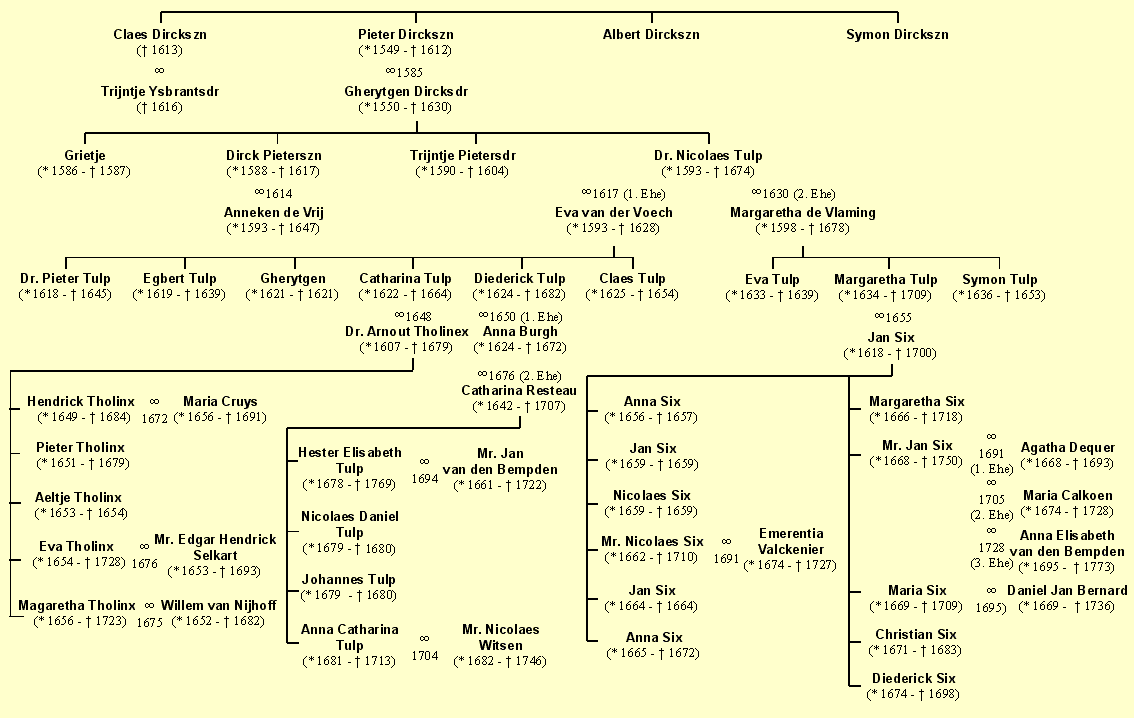
Tulp family tree

Dirck and Anna (also painted by the German, Jurriaen Ovens) moved to Kloveniersburgwal 47 in 1669. Dirck's wife died in 1672 and Tulp left for England, visiting his wife's cousin, the diplomat Coenraad van Beuningen. Despite his many contacts, Dirck Tulp never became mayor. Tulp was named by mayor Gillis Valckenier "an ignorant vain man", after his two-year stay out of the country, during which he sent back no letters. In 1675 Tulp was to be dismissed, but he changed his lifestyle and prevented dismissal. In 1676, he was made a baronet by Charles II, paying a large amount of money. He was appointed as colonel in the Schutterij, the Dutch volunteer city guard.

As a widower, he remarried Katharina Resteau. From that marriage came four children, but both sons, twins, died young. His second wife was painted twice. With the death of Dirck Tulp the male line of the Tulp family died out. Dirck's daughter would later marry the mayor of Amsterdam, and specialist in trade with Russia, Nicolaes Witsen.

Baronetage of England
New creation	Baronet (of Amsterdam); 1675–1682	Extinct
