= Breeveld =

- Hamlet
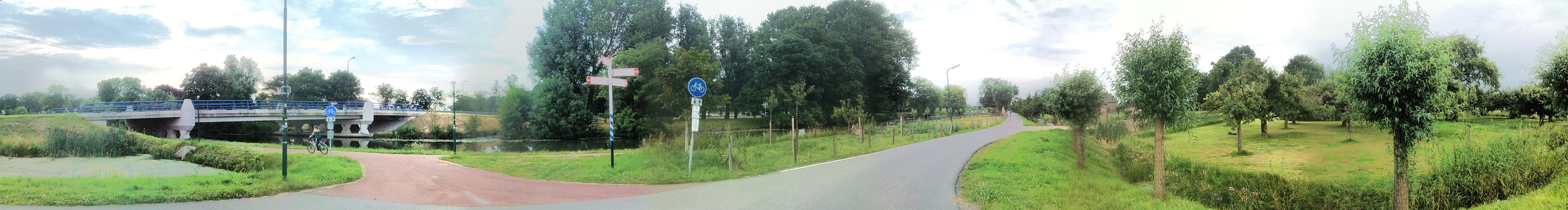
- Breeveld, by the Limesbrug in July 2012

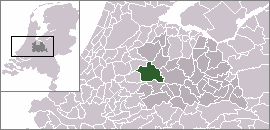

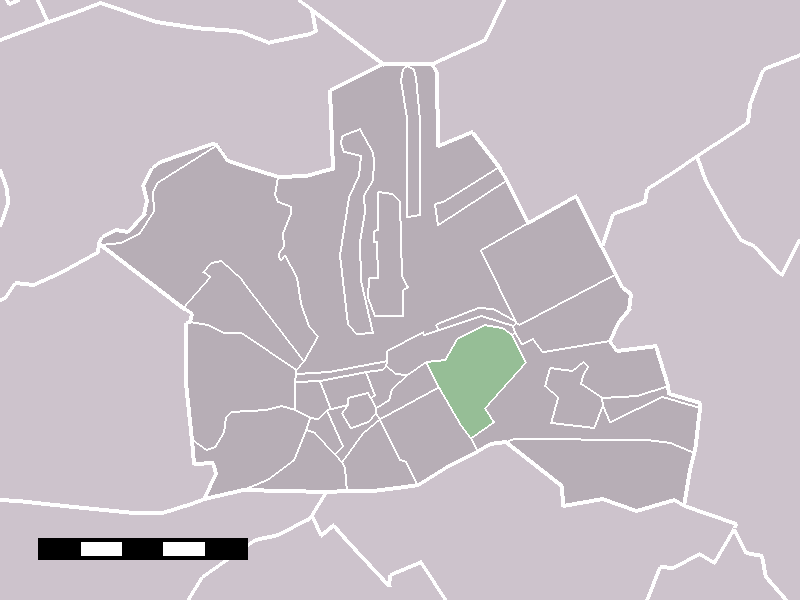
- The statistical district of Breeveld in the municipality of Woerden.
- Coordinates: 52°5′50″N 4°54′40″E
- Country: Netherlands
- Province: Utrecht
- Municipality: Woerden

Area
  - Total: 1.42 km^{2} (0.55 sq mi)

Population (2021)
  - Total: 95
  - Density: 67/km^{2} (170/sq mi)
- Time zone: UTC+1 (CET)
  - Summer (DST): UTC+2 (CEST)
- Postal code: 3445
- Dialing code: 0348

Breeveld is a hamlet in the Dutch province of Utrecht. It is a part of the municipality of Woerden, and lies about 4 km northeast of the city centre.

The hamlet was first mentioned in 1217 as Bretevelt, and means "wide field". Breeveld has no place name signs.

== Gallery ==
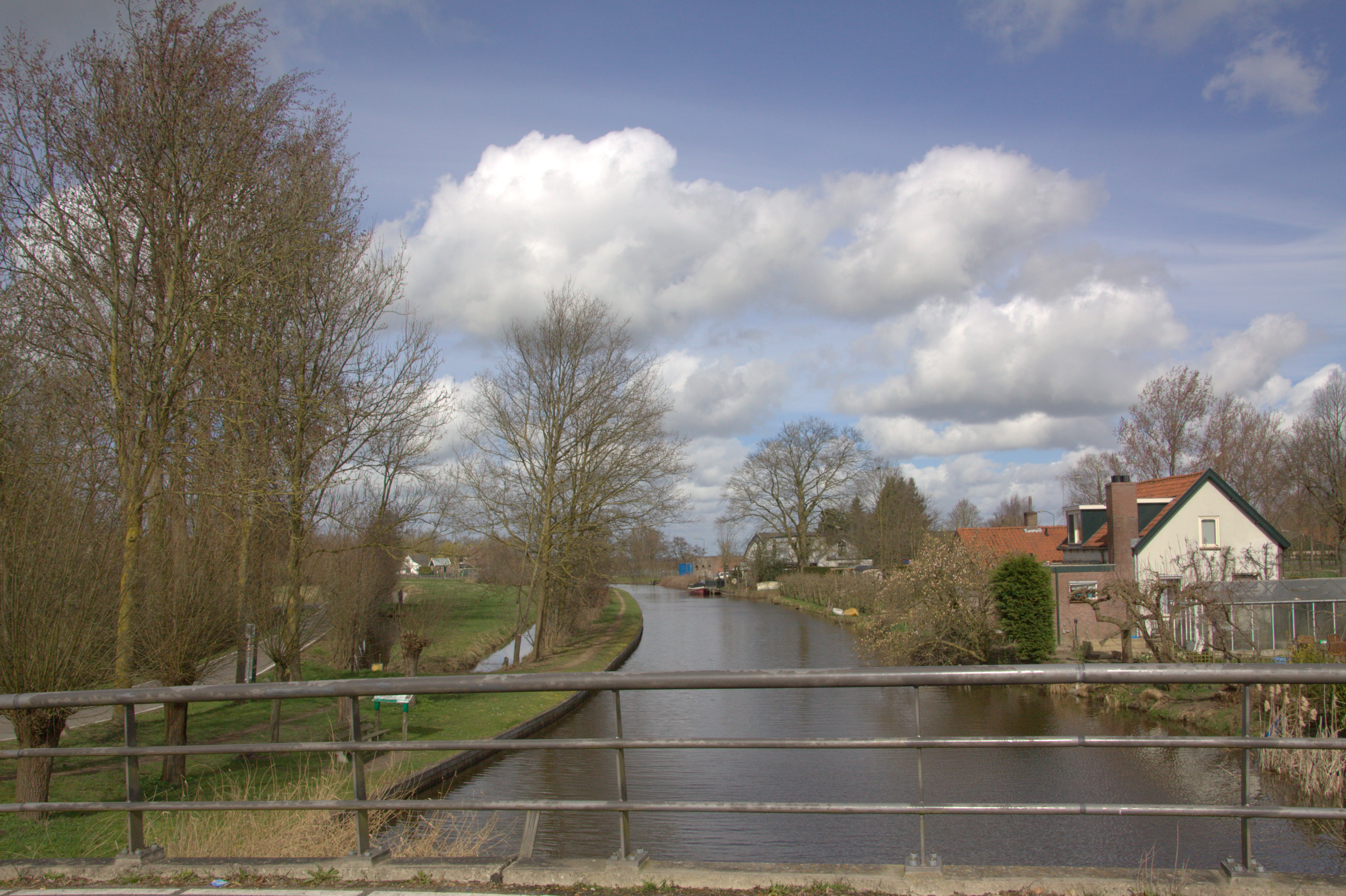
Breeveld (left) and Geestdorp (right) along the Oude Rijn

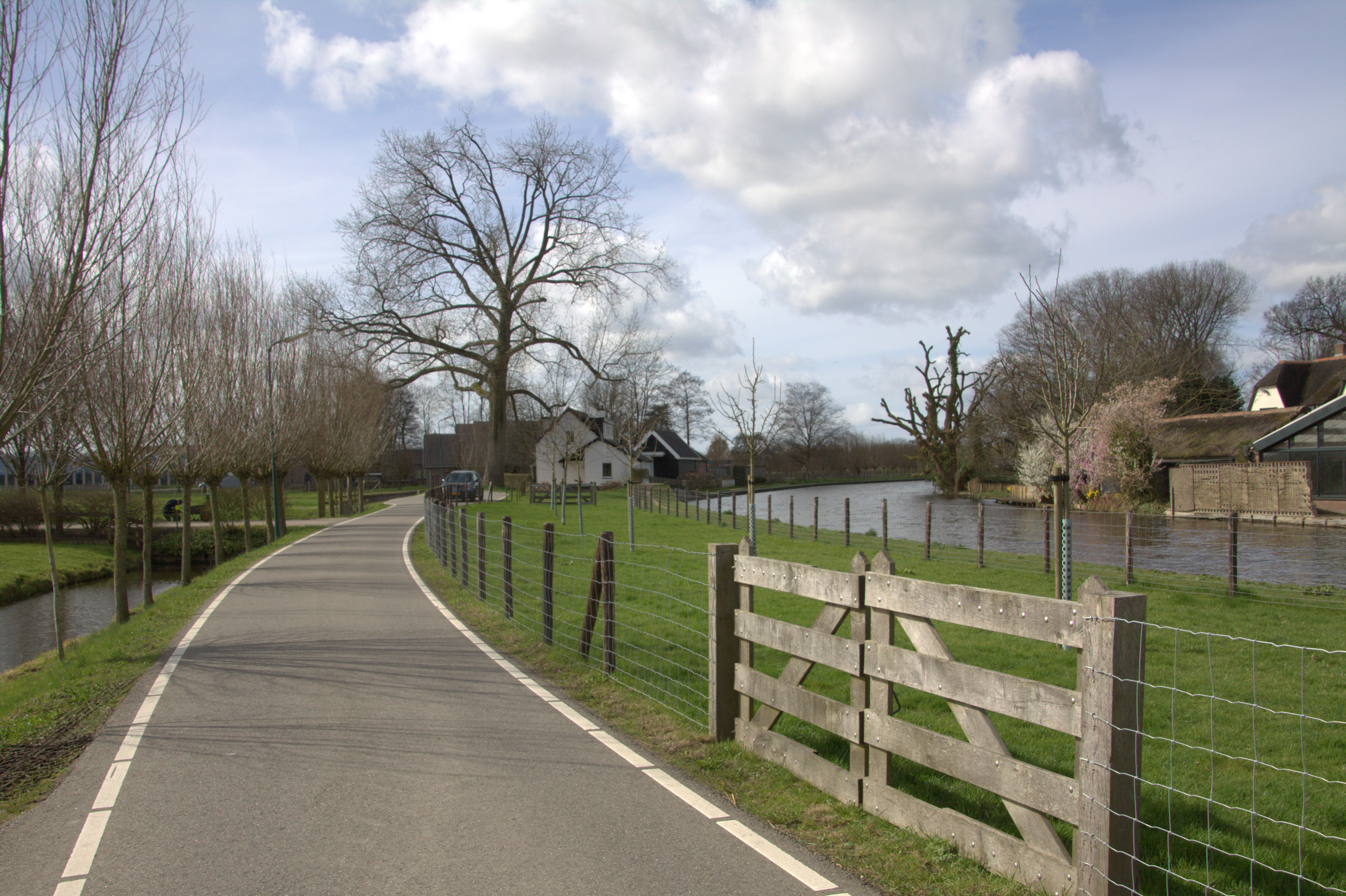
View on Breeveld

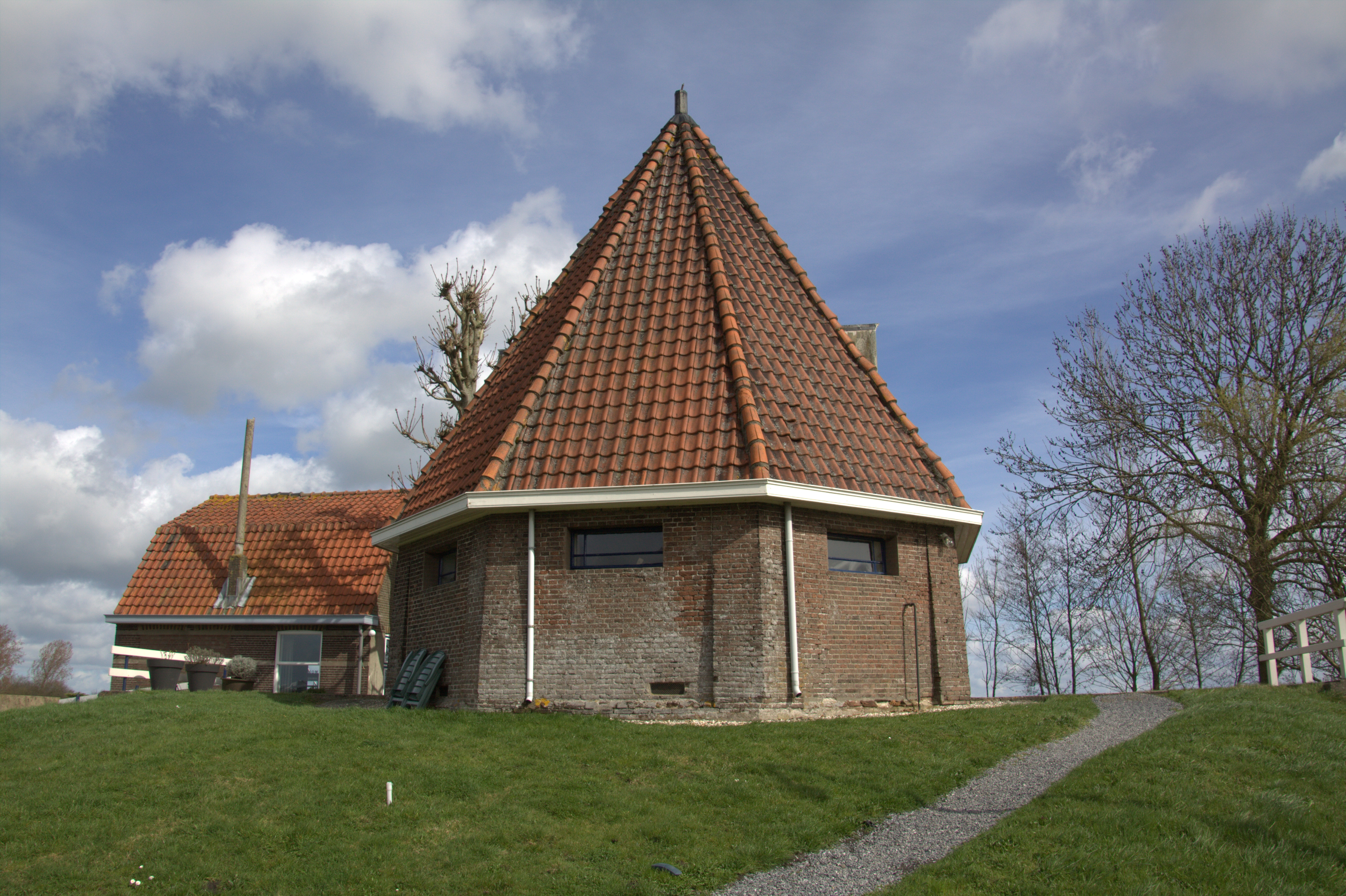
Pumping station
