= Coenraad van Beuningen =

Dutch diplomat and politician (1622–1693)

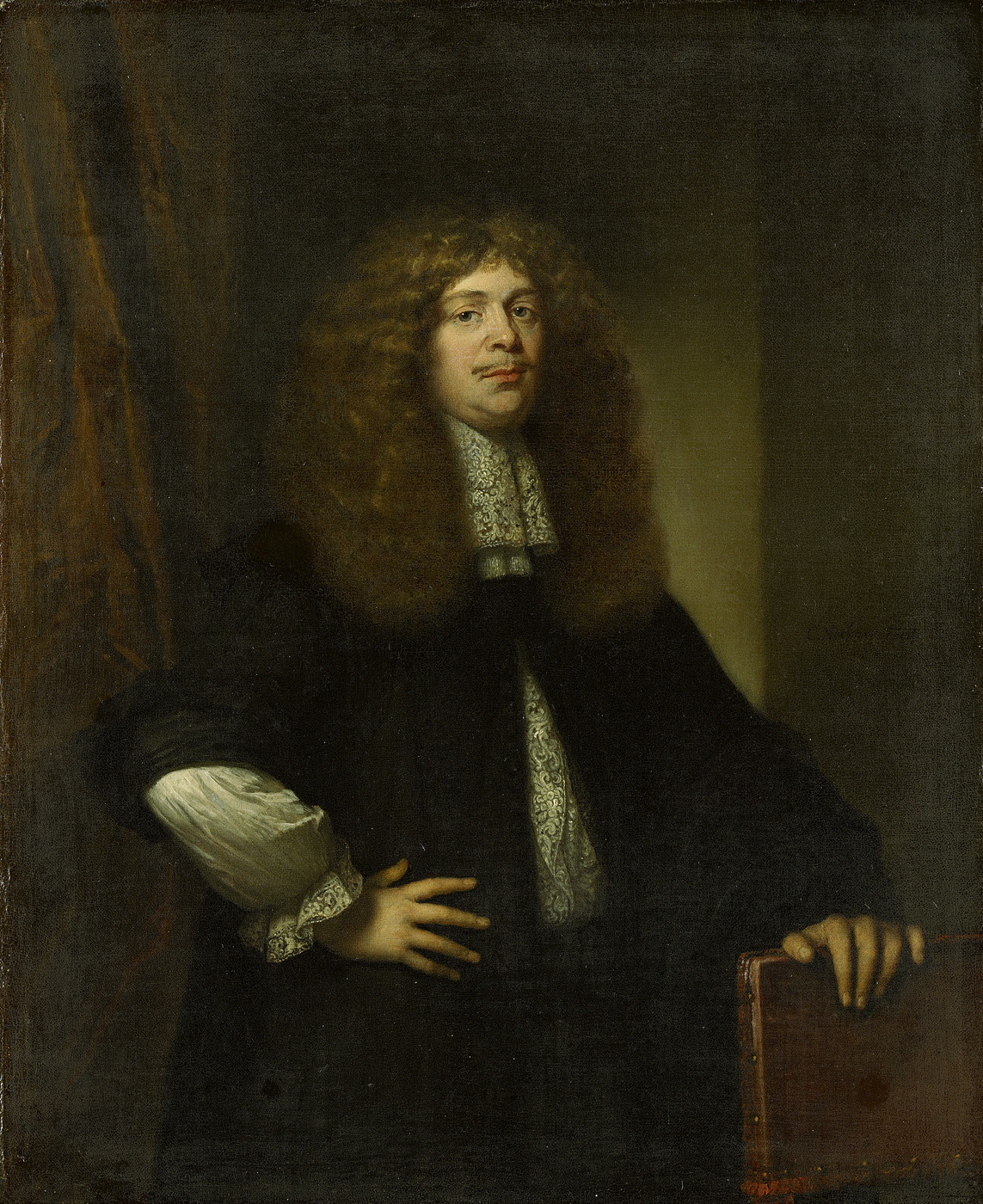
- Coenraad van Beuningen in 1673 by Caspar Netscher
- Born: 1622; Amsterdam, Dutch Republic
- Died: 26 October 1693; Amsterdam, Dutch Republic
- Occupations: Diplomat, mayor, director

Coenraad van Beuningen (1622 – 26 October 1693) was the Dutch Republic's most experienced diplomat, burgomaster of Amsterdam in 1669, 1672, 1680, 1681, 1683 and 1684, and from 1681 a Dutch East India Company director. He probably was bipolar, becoming unstable after the loss of his fortune in 1688.

== Life ==
=== Early life ===
Coenraad was baptised at home because his father Dirk van Beuningen and mother Catharina Burgh were Remonstrants and did not want to cause a fuss. He was the grandson of Geurt van Beuningen as well as of Albert C. Burgh, both mayors of Amsterdam and heavily involved in the Dutch East India Company. Coenraad grew up near the Sint Antoniesbreestraat in a very multi-religious and multi-ethnic neighbourhood, next to Pieter Lastman. He was taught at the Latin school of Gerhard Johann Vossius and Barlaeus, before commencing studies at the University of Leiden in 1639. In 1642, Hugo de Groot, Swedish envoy in Paris, made Coenraad his secretary and in 1643 Coenraad became town clerk in Amsterdam, although he did not feel himself capable.

=== Sweden ===
About 1650, Van Beuningen felt himself attracted to Spinoza and the Collegiants in Rijnsburg. He lived as simply as possible, without a job, somewhere within the area. In 1652, he was sent on a mission to Queen Christina of Sweden, who was being taught Greek by his schoolfriend Isaac Vossius. In 1654 he travelled to Stade to negotiate an end to an argument about the entry point to the Oresund. The north of Germany was occupied by the Swedes. The Danes tried to control the Elbe, the trade to Hamburg and occupied Bremen. Van Beuningen pronounced that the keys of Oresund lay in a dock in Amsterdam. Three years later as an envoy in Copenhagen, he almost ended up in the hands of King Charles X Gustav of Sweden but succeeded in getting away in a small boat.

=== Ambassador ===
In 1660, he was sent on missions to France and England. Louis XIV offered him a post in France that he refused. Van Beuningen warned against the imperialist and mercantilist French policy and wanted to move to Constantinople. He was impressed by Jan Swammerdam, who was travelling in France to study, and remained his firm supporter for the rest of his life. In the same year, 1664, a treaty with France was followed by the Second Anglo-Dutch War and the Triple Alliance. In 1669, he bought a plot in a backstreet and built a house (Blijenburg) in 's-Gravenhage and embellished it with paintings and Turkish rugs. Van Beuningen agreed to the ban on French silk and to actions against French brandy and salt. In that year he became mayor of Amsterdam. In 1672, he was nominated as the successor to Johan de Witt, not being a hard core republican. Losing the favour of stadholder William III an attempt was made on his life; it is said he was shocked and burnt part of his furniture. In one of his letters he wrote of the fantastic expansion of trade and imperialism in India and America. He also noticed that the Dutch Republic had had for 150 years more soldiers than all the other Christian countries put together.

=== Later years ===
Van Beuningen became more interested in literature, philosophy, theology, history and the natural sciences. He wrote deeply on the consequences of the tropical winds and currents, discussing them with Isaac Vossius. He was on friendly terms with Jan Six and Anna Maria van Schurman. Van Beuningen was interested in the ideas of Descartes and combined this with an interest for mysticism, astrology, Millennialism dream-interpretation and supernatural wonders. He sympathised with Jean de Labadie and the Quakers.

In 1672 the Rampjaar, the local theatre, called Schouwburg of Van Campen, was shut during the war with the French, the English and two German bishops, Bernhard von Galen from Münster and Maximilian Henry of Bavaria from Cologne. In 1677 it reopened, after a determined campaign led by Van Beuningen and Joan Hudde, on condition nothing was staged which could be deemed harmful either to public morals or the public church. In 1682, he funded the publication of the work of the mystic Jacob Böhme. In 1686, Van Beuningen married his neighbour, the rich and lewd Jacoba Victoria Bartolotti, many years his junior.

Van Beuningen demanded economies by the Dutch East India Company (VOC), proposing measures to introduce more efficient administration and demanding more supervision and sharper observance of the Company's rules in Asia. Conditions were peaceful and so convoys and the maintenance of the VOC's forts were now deemed less necessary. Attacked in his various roles for making these suggestions, he renounced them, but claimed the company's success was the work of its capable administrators in its first twenty years.

Van Beuningen lost half a million guilder in 1688 through speculation in VOC shares. The funding of the armed invasion of William III in England caused a financial crisis in the Dutch Republic. Following Van Beuningen's resultant madness the city of Amsterdam was appointed his legal guardian. Quickly he was put under custodial care by his colleagues, one of whom was Johannes Hudde. His house in the Hague was taken over in 1690 by the VOC.

In his last years Van Beuningen wrote letters to the ecclesiastical authorities about the coming apocalypse, painting Hebrew or Kabbalistic signs on his house at the Amstel. He was locked up nearby and died in Amsterdam on 26 October 1693, leaving 'a cape and two dressing gowns,' a bed, some chairs, a desk, an oval shaped mirror, four old taborets and 'a man's portrait' by Rembrandt valued at seven guilders (three dollars).
