= Reynier Pauw =

Amsterdam regent

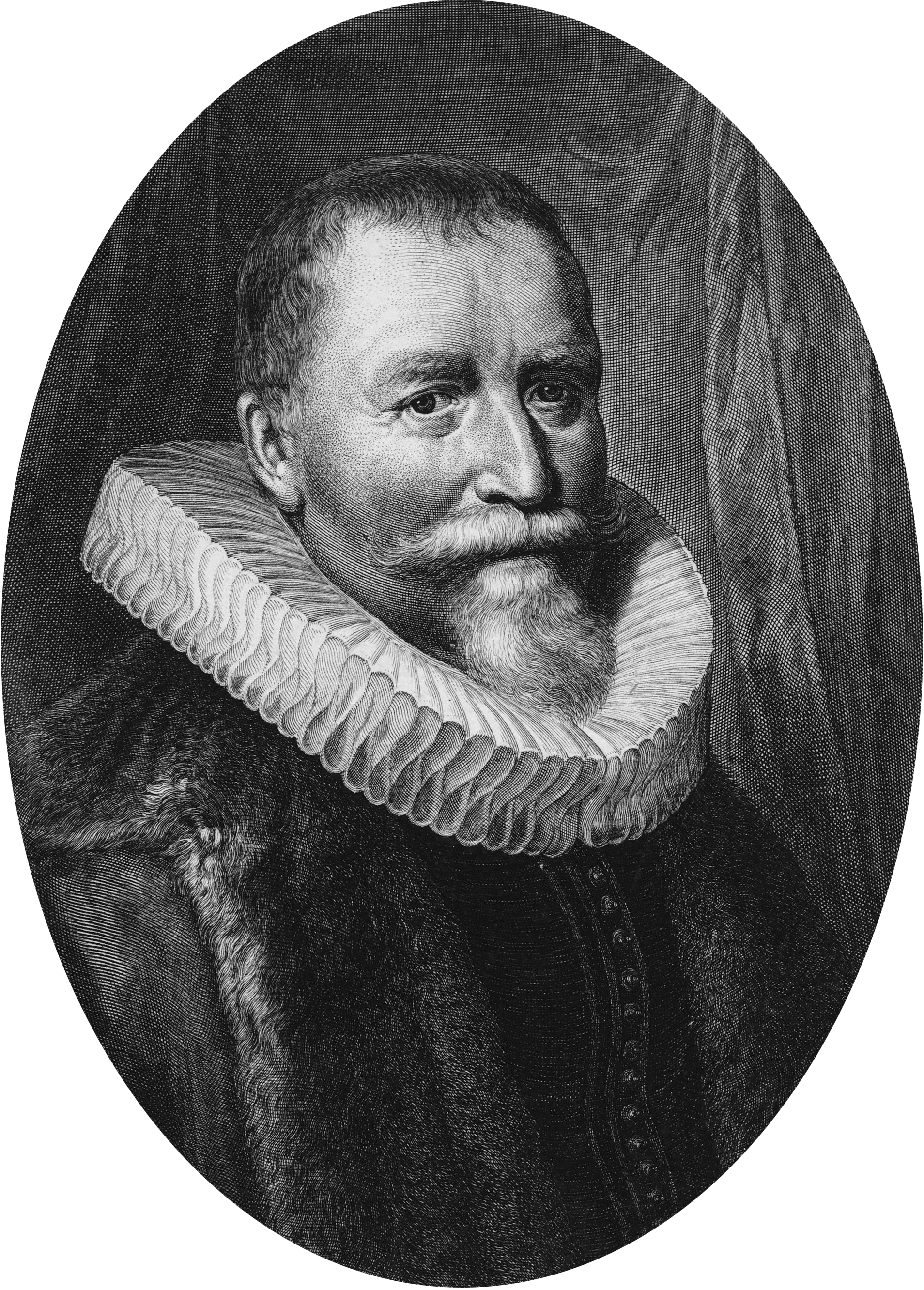
Reinier Pauw, portrait by Jan Anthonisz. van Ravesteyn.

Reyer or Reynier Pauw, (Amsterdam, July 29, 1564 – February 19, 1636 ) was an Amsterdam regent of the Golden Age. Pauw was pensionary and eight times mayor of Amsterdam. He was involved in the Compagnie van Verre, the VOC, and the trial of Johan van Oldenbarnevelt.

== Biography ==
Reynier Pauw was a member of the patrician Pauw family, originally from Gouda. His father was Adriaen Pauw, an influential merchant in grain, who had fled to Emden at the arrival of the Duke of Alva. His mother was Anna Jacoba Lucasdr. van Persijn (1520–1586). The family returned to Amsterdam in 1578, and Adriaen Pauw was elected mayor after the Alteration. He died after four months.

Reynier traded in salt shipped from Portugal to the Baltic and had grain and wood shipped back. He was elected alderman in 1590 and a member of the vroedschap in 1591. Pauw lived on Warmoesstraat and it is likely that the Compagnie van Verre formed in Amsterdam in 1594 was founded at his home. He arranged for his relative Cornelis de Houtman to become chief merchant at what later became known as the First Dutch Expedition to East Indies. In 1597, he participated in equipping ships to Guyana and Brazil. In 1602 he was among the largest investors in the Vereenigde Oost-Indische Compagnie, of which he became administrator.

In 1605 he became mayor, as in 1609, 1611, 1614, 1616, 1617, 1619 and 1620. At the formation of the Twelve Year Truce, a controversy arose between him and Van Oldenbarnevelt over the establishment of the WIC. From 1611 he was involved in the Third Enlargement of Amsterdam. With Gerrit Jacobsz. Witsen, he traded with Moscow via Archangelsk. In addition, he equipped ships to Venice. In 1617, a reign of terror against the Remonstrants began.

The highlight of his mayoralty were the years 1618 and 1619, when he was an elder and maintained correspondence with Stadholder Maurits of Orange. Between 1618 and June 24, 1622, he was a deputy at the States-General of the Netherlands, in which capacity, in February 1619, he was appointed a member of the court charged with hearing the trial of the attorney, Johan van Oldenbarnevelt. Pauw was one of the judges who sentenced him to death. Rombout Hogerbeets and Hugo Grotius were also captured and imprisoned at Loevestein Castle. A legislative adjournment followed in February 1618, in which seven Remonstrants lost their seats.

Gradually, the government of Amsterdam broke away from the fiercest Calvinists. Pauw fell in disgrace after 1620 and was passed over in the mayoral election of 1622. As compensation, he was appointed ambassador to king Christian IV of Denmark, who resided in Bremen. There he was assisted by Foppe van Aitzema. In 1628 he tried to regain his position within Amsterdam by pitting the militia against the liberal mayors. A Pauw would never again be appointed mayor of Amsterdam. After Pauw's political end, the management of the city government fell into the hands of the Arminian clique around Andries Bicker and his uncle Jacob Dircksz de Graeff.

Reynier married twice: in 1584 to Cornelia Michiels de Lange and in 1618 to Elbrich Jansdr. He was the father of Michiel Pauw, Adriaan Pauw and Cornelis Pauw. In 1631, his fortune was estimated at 200,000 guilders, making him one of the wealthiest people in Amsterdam.

== Sources ==
- Balbian Verster, J.F.L. de (1942) Burgemeesters van Amsterdam in de 17e en 18e eeuw.
- J. Elias Geschiedenis van het Amsterdamsche Regentenpatriciaat. Den Haag 1923.
- Jonathan I. Israel: The Dutch Republic – Its Rise, Greatness, and Fall - 1477–1806. Clarendon Press, Oxford 1995, ISBN 0-19-820734-4, p. 345, 451–452.
- Reinier Pauws. In: Biografisch Woordenboek van Nederland.
