= Cornelis Andriesz Boelens Loen =

Dutch statesman and Councilor (1552–1584)

Coat of arms of the family Boelens Loen

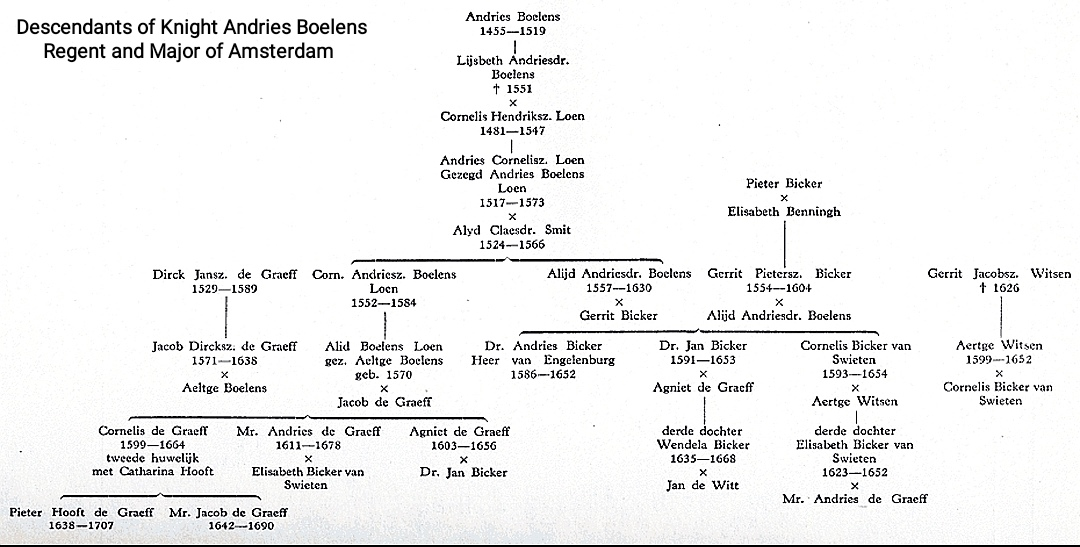
Overview of the personal family relationships of the Amsterdam regent-dynasties Boelens Loen, De Graeff, Bicker (van Swieten), Witsen and Johan de Witt in the Dutch Golden Age

Cornelis Andriesz Boelens Loen (* 1552 in Amsterdam, † 1584 there) was a Dutch statesman and Councilor from the time of the Dutch Revolt.

== Family ==
His father was Andries Cornelisz Boelens Loen (1517-1573), his great-grandfather Andries Boelens, a well known mayor of Amsterdam. The Boelens Loen family was deeply involved in the history of their home town. His sister Alijd Andriesdr Boelens Loen (1557-1630) was married to Gerrit Bicker and the mother of the important Bicker brothers including Andries Bicker. Cornelis Boelens Loen married Alyd Claesdr Smit. From this marriage emerged Aaltje Boelens Loen (1579-1630), who was married to Jacob Dircksz de Graeff. Cornelis Boelens Loen was probably the last male heir of his family; his large fortune passed to his daughter Aaltje and her husband Jacob. Boelens had one illegitimate daughter, Sara Cornelisdr Boelens.

== Career ==
After the Alteratie, Boelens Loen became a member of the Vroedschap in 1579 and Schepen of the city of Amsterdam in 1581. He was a trusted advisor to William I of Orange-Nassau (William the Silent). As such he was present at the battles lost by the Dutch against the Spanish at Groningen and Rennenberg. His political offices led him to a short time as Holland's Gecommitteerde Rad in the States General and in the Council of State. Under the command of the Willem I, he also became a high-ranking military.
