= Geestdorp =

- Hamlet
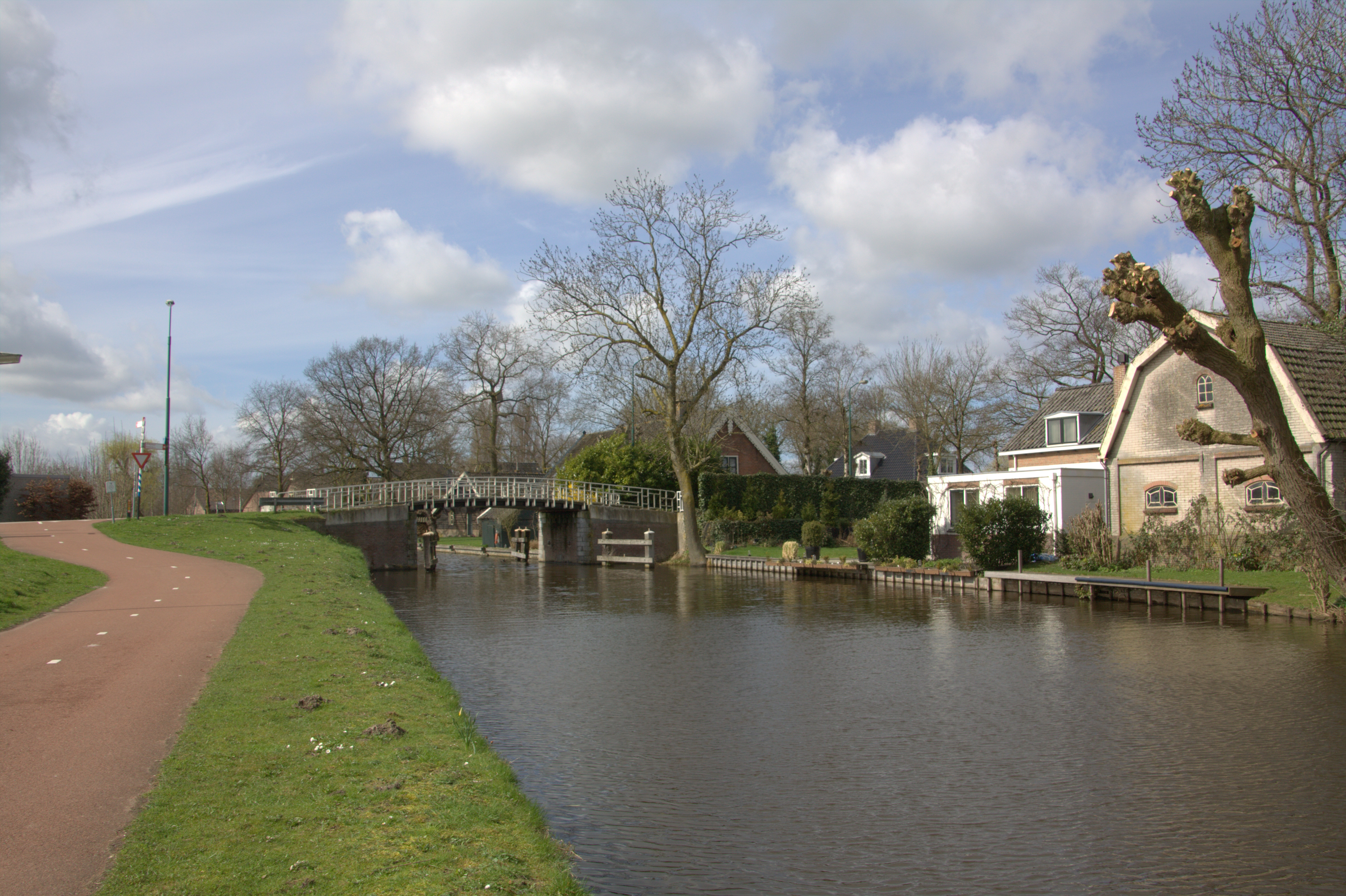
- Geestdorp on the Oude Rijn

- Location in the Netherlands Geestdorp (Netherlands)
- Coordinates: 52°05′50″N 4°54′16″E
- Country: Netherlands
- Province: Utrecht
- Municipality: Woerden

Area
  - Total: 1.51 km^{2} (0.58 sq mi)

Population (2021)
  - Total: 195
  - Density: 129/km^{2} (334/sq mi)
- Time zone: UTC+1 (CET)
  - Summer (DST): UTC+2 (CEST)
- Postal code: 3444
- Dialing code: 0348

Geestdorp is a hamlet in the Dutch province of Utrecht. It is a part of the municipality of Woerden, and lies about 2 km northeast of the city centre.

The hamlet was first mentioned in 1272 as Ghersdorp, and means "settlement near grassland". It does not have place name signs. In the mid-19th century, Geestdorp was home to 140 people.

== Gallery ==
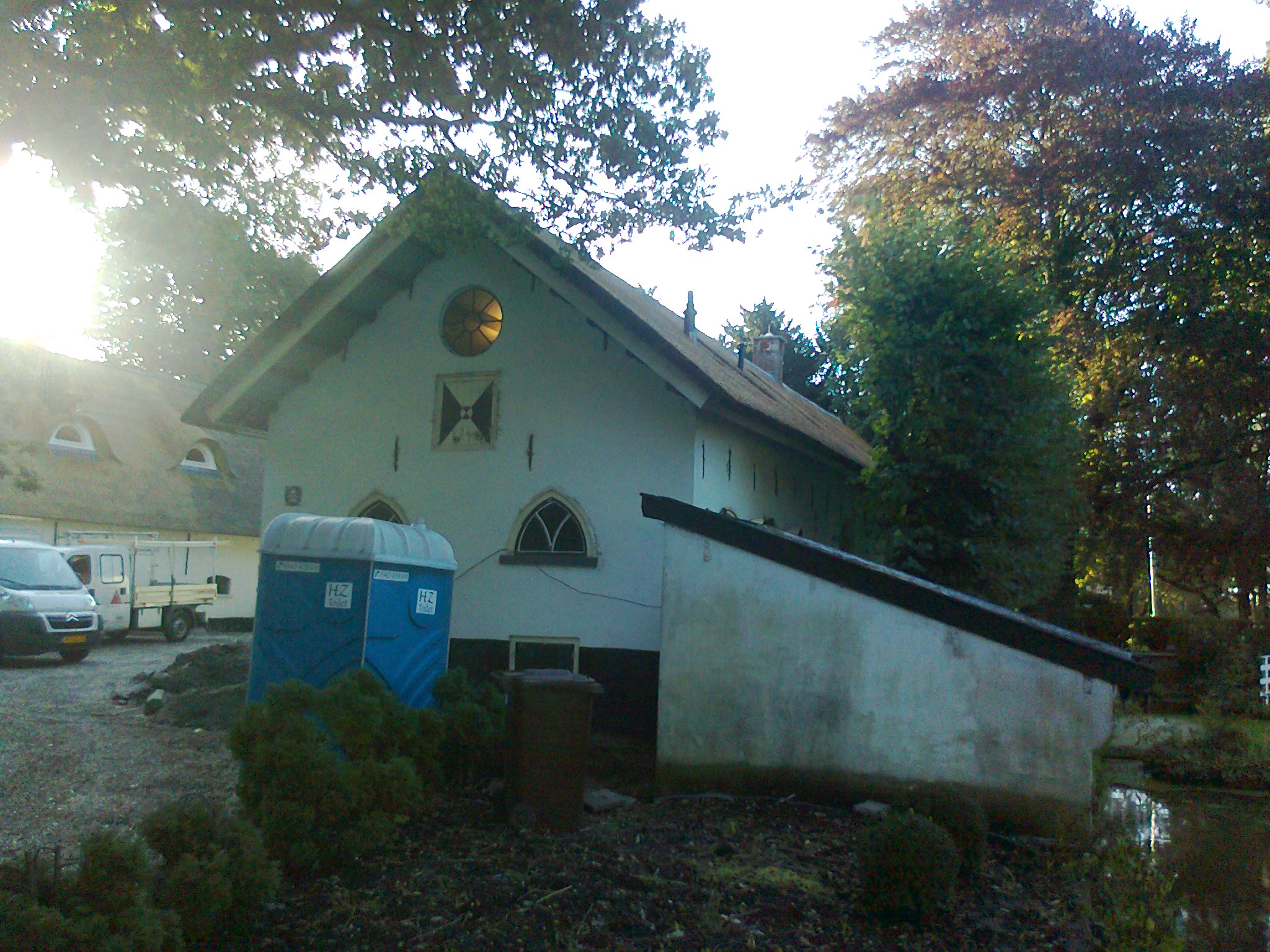
Boschlust

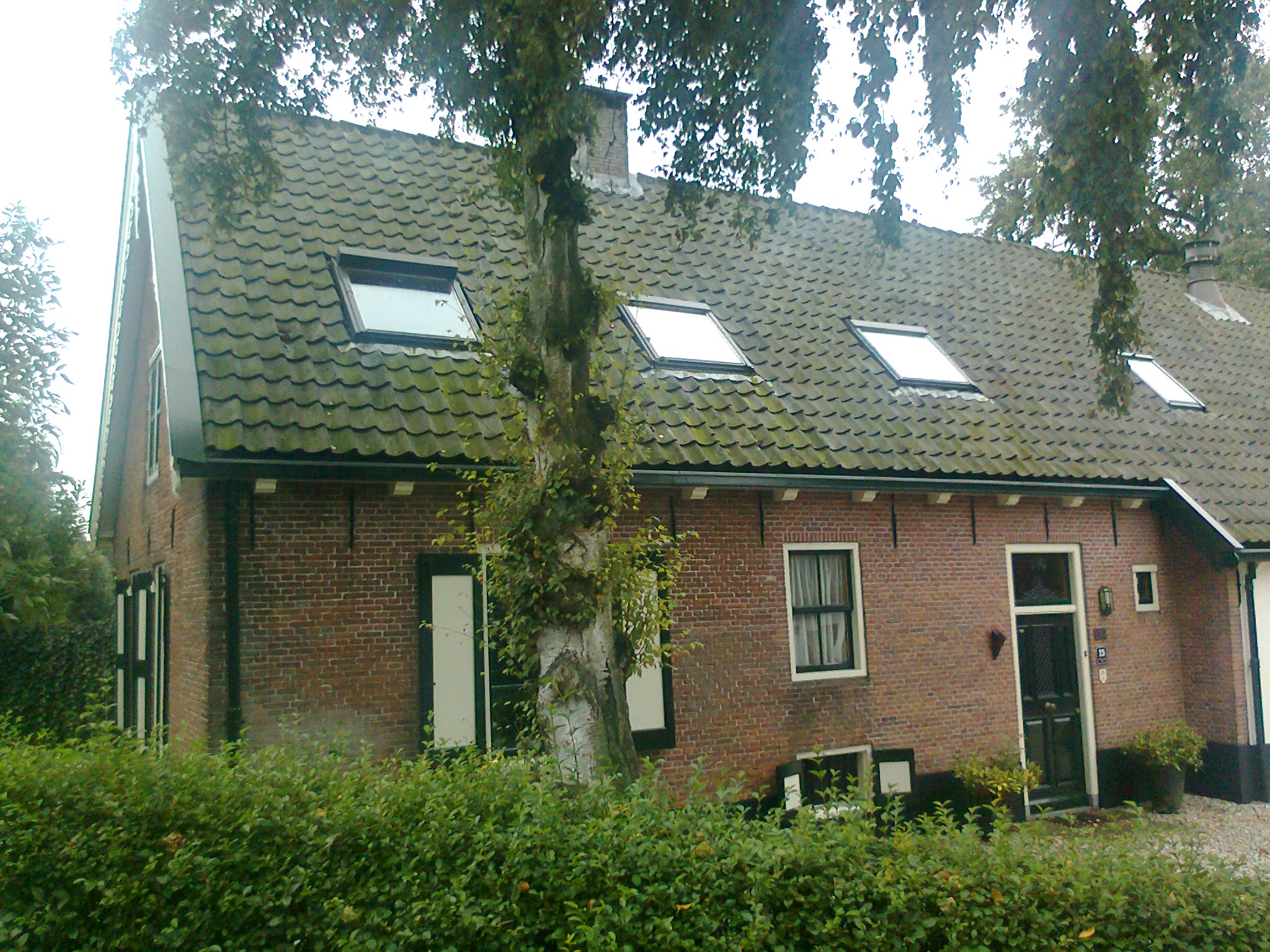
Farm in Geestdorp

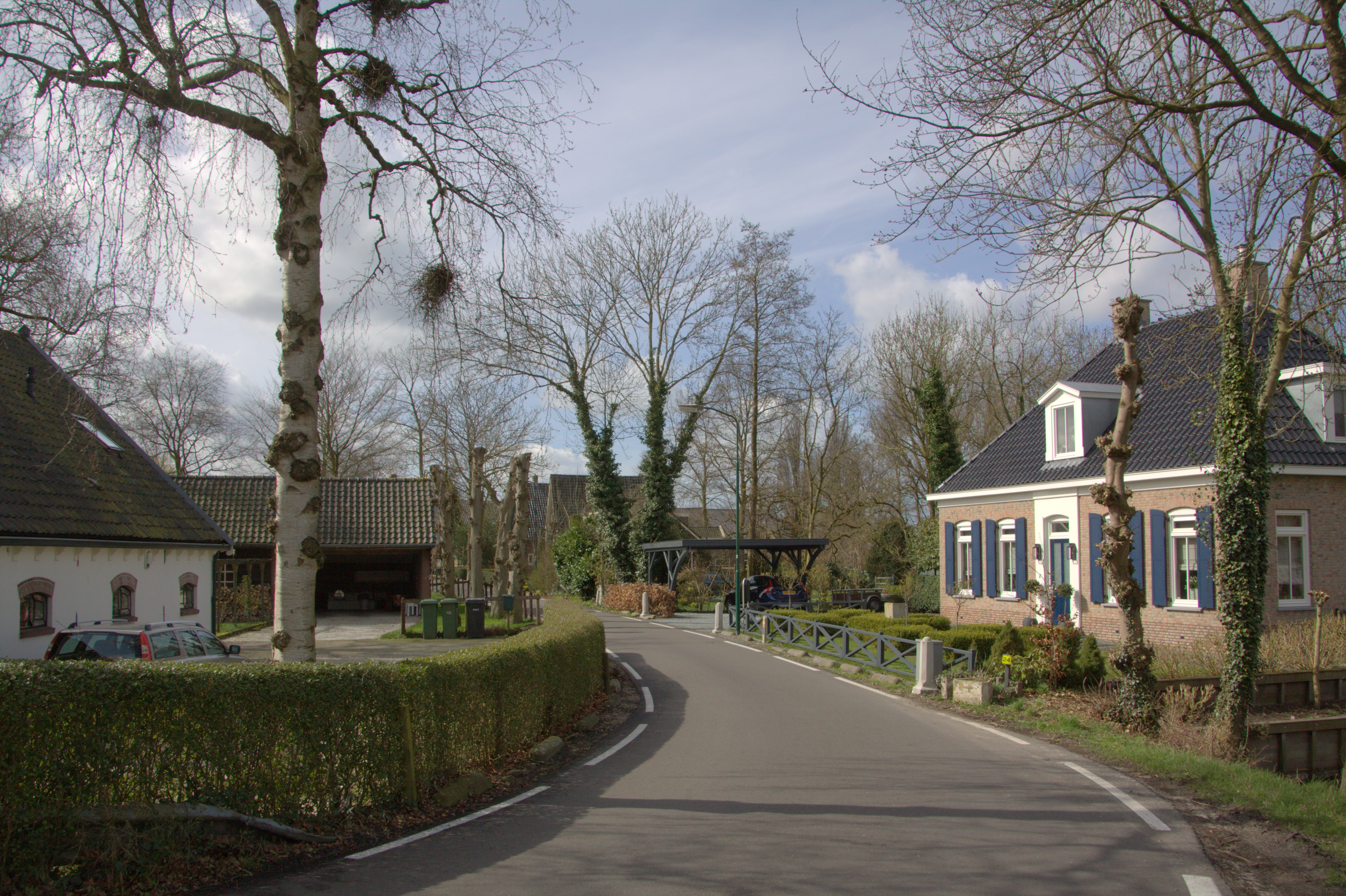
Village street
