= Boelens Loen =

Dutch Patrician family

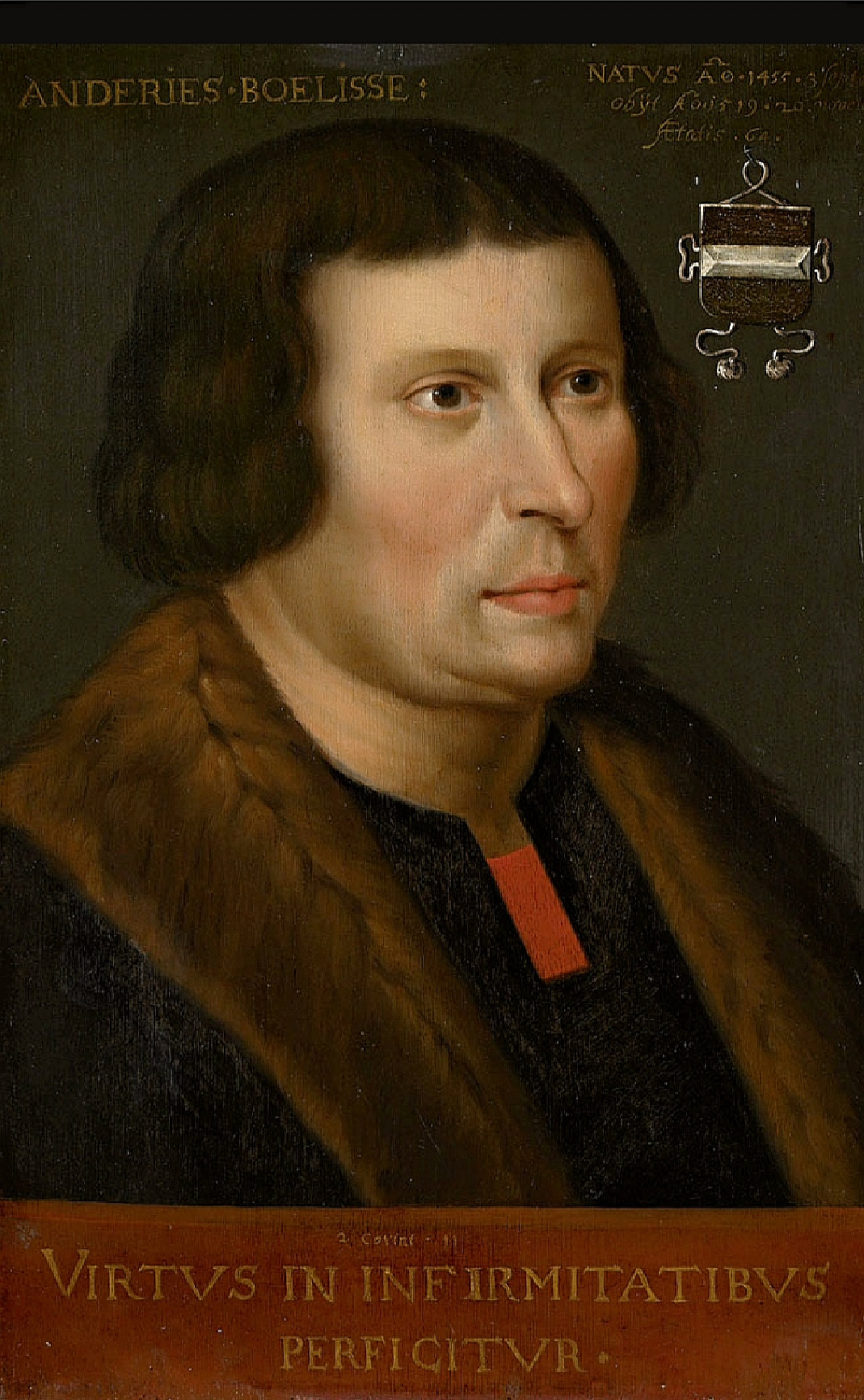
Andries Boelens (1455-1519), longtime burgomaster of Amsterdam and the most illustrious member of the Boelens family

The Boelens (also Boel) and Boelens Loen were a Dutch patrician family of Amsterdam. The family figured in the city's government lists between the years 1360 and 1680. They were considered to be quite an influential Amsterdam family in their time and were intensely involved in the history of their hometown. Between 1495 and 1538 the oligarchy of the so-called Boelen-Heijnen clan was at the forefront of the Amsterdam city government.

== History ==
=== Boelens ===
The members of the Boelens family, through their long tenure in the city government, were able to complete the formation of a solid oligarchic elite within Amsterdam. In 1495 they were able to take power from the clan (“maatschap”) of Jacob Jonge Jacobsz, only to have to hand it over to the clan of Hendrick Dircksen and Joost Buyck (until around 1578) in 1538. The reason for the loss of their prominent position was also due to the family's religious attitude, including in the Baptist rebellion.

The first mayors from the Boelen family in the 15th century were Jacob Boel, mayor from 1420 to 1421, and Claes Jansz Boel, mayor from 1431 and 1434. At the beginning of the further development was Dirck Boelens, who was able to give it space with his appointments as governing mayor in 1447, 1453, 1454 and 1457. On his death he left his family large estates in the Amsterdam area, three houses in the city and a considerable fortune. His son Boel Dirck Boelens continued this development with his appointment as mayor from 1470 to 1478.

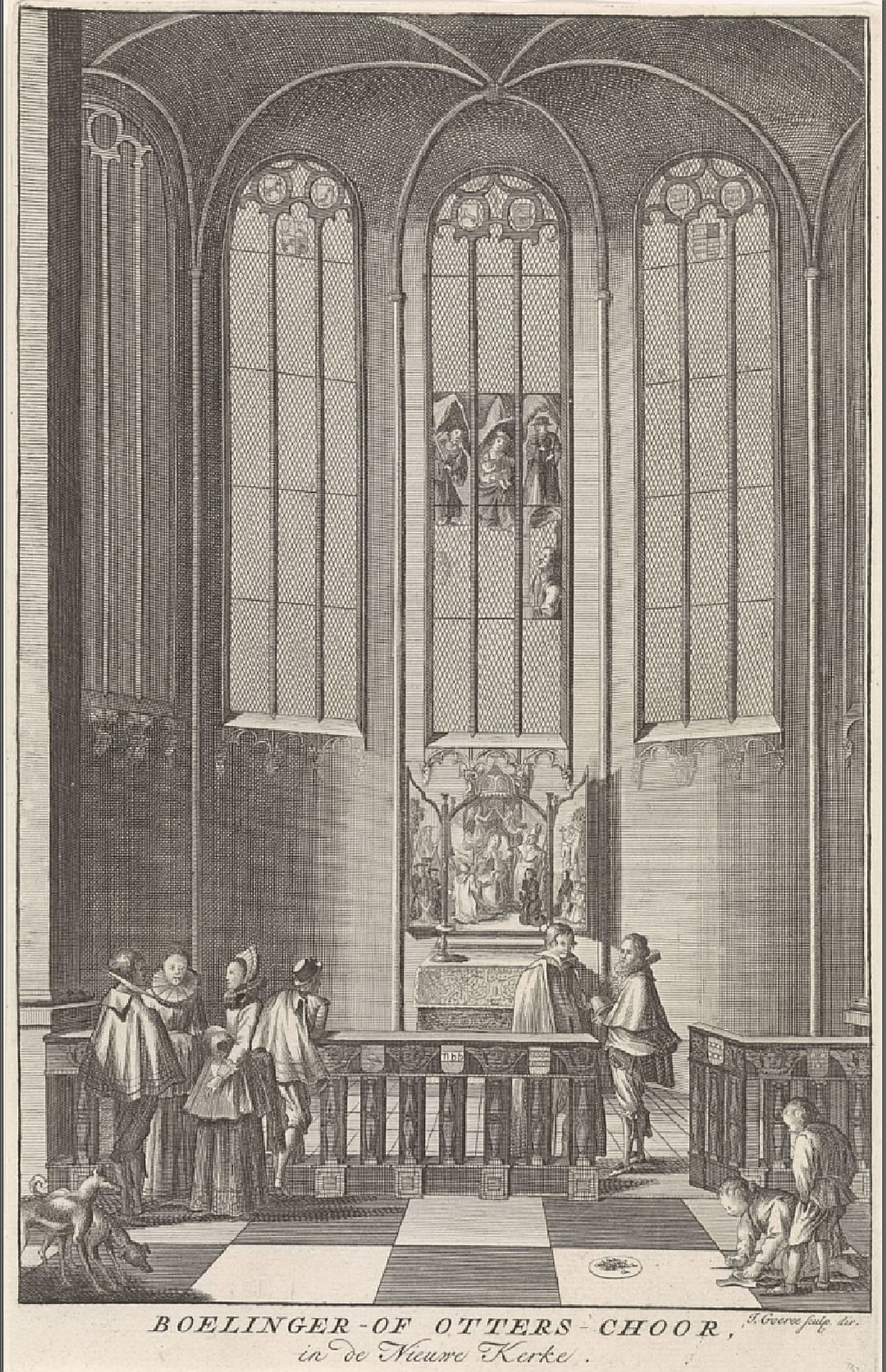
Boelens-Den Otter chapel in the Nieuwe Kerk at Amsterdam

His son Andries Boelens, who was at the head of the city government in 1496–1497, 1499, 1501–1502, 1504–1505, 1507–1510, 1512, 1514-1515 and 1517, is considered to be an outstanding member of his family. Due to his long tenure and the resulting concentration and development of power, Boelens is considered the progenitor of the Amsterdam regents of the Dutch Golden Age, who largely claimed descent from him. In addition to Andries Boelens, Andries Dircksz Boelens also worked as mayor in the city government from 1501 to 1510.

Andries Boelen's son Albert Andriesz Boelens inherited a fortune of 14,355 guilders, estates, ships and a magnificent town house in Amsterdam from his father. He was able to continue the political legacy without gaps and was elected governing mayor nine times between 1520 and 1537.

Albert Andriesz Boelen's grandson (and great-grandson of Andries Boelens) Jacob Andriesz Boelens stands out from the Boelens Loen family line. In addition to his work as mayor of Amsterdam 13 times, he was also State Councilor of Holland, deputy of the Dutch States General and Dutch envoy to the court of the East Frisian ruler Count Edzard II and to Denmark was with King Christian IV. The last mayor from the family was Jan Claes Boelens, who held this office in 1600. The main line of the family, which had remained catholic, had died out in the male line in 1647.

=== Boelens Loen ===
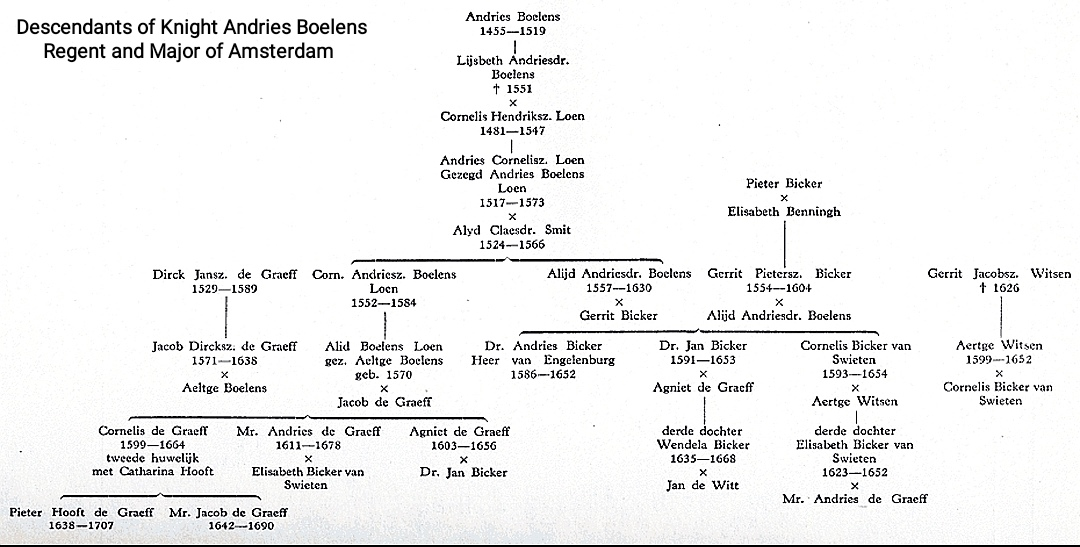
Descendants of Andries Boelens. Overview of the personal family relationships of the Amsterdam regent-dynasties Boelens Loen, De Graeff, Bicker (van Swieten), Witsen and Johan de Witt in the Dutch Golden Age

Andries Boelen's daughter Lijsbeth Boelens married Cornelis Hendricksz Loen (1481–1547), who was mayor of Amsterdam three times between 1529 and 1533. They established the Boelens Loen line from which several mayors of the city emerged and were related to the great regent families of the Dutch Golden Age, De Graeff and Bicker, who came to power after the Alteratie of Amsterdam in 1578. Thus, in the course of the 16th century, a dense network of related patrician and noble families emerged in Amsterdam, who divided power and offices among themselves. The governing members of such families who competed for mayor and other important offices within the city were called regents.

Lijsbeth's grandson Cornelis Andriesz Boelens Loen (1552–1584) had been a trusted advisor to William I of Orange-Nassau. His daughter Aaltje Boelens Loen (1579–1630) married Jacob Dircksz de Graeff (1571–1638).

=== Genealogical and political Legacy ===
The eminent mayors of the Dutch Golden Age, Cornelis (1599-1664) and Andries de Graeff (1611-1678) and their cousins Andries (1586-1652) and Cornelis Bicker (1592-1654), saw themselves as the political heirs of the old regent family Boelens, whose main lineage, which had remained catholic, had died out in the male line in 1647. They had received the very significant first names Andries and Cornelis from their Boelens ancestors. As in a real dynasty, members of the two families frequently intermarried in the 17th century in order to keep their political and commercial capital together. Its great historical ancestor was Andries Boelens (1455-1519), the city's most influential medieval mayor. He was allowed to hold the highest office in Amsterdam fifteen times. Both families, Bicker and De Graeff, descend in the female line from Boelens.

== Coat of arms ==
Boelens coat of arms

Loen coat of arms,

Boelens Loen coat of arms

Boelens coat of arms variant
