= Rietveld, Woerden =

Rietveld
- Hamlet
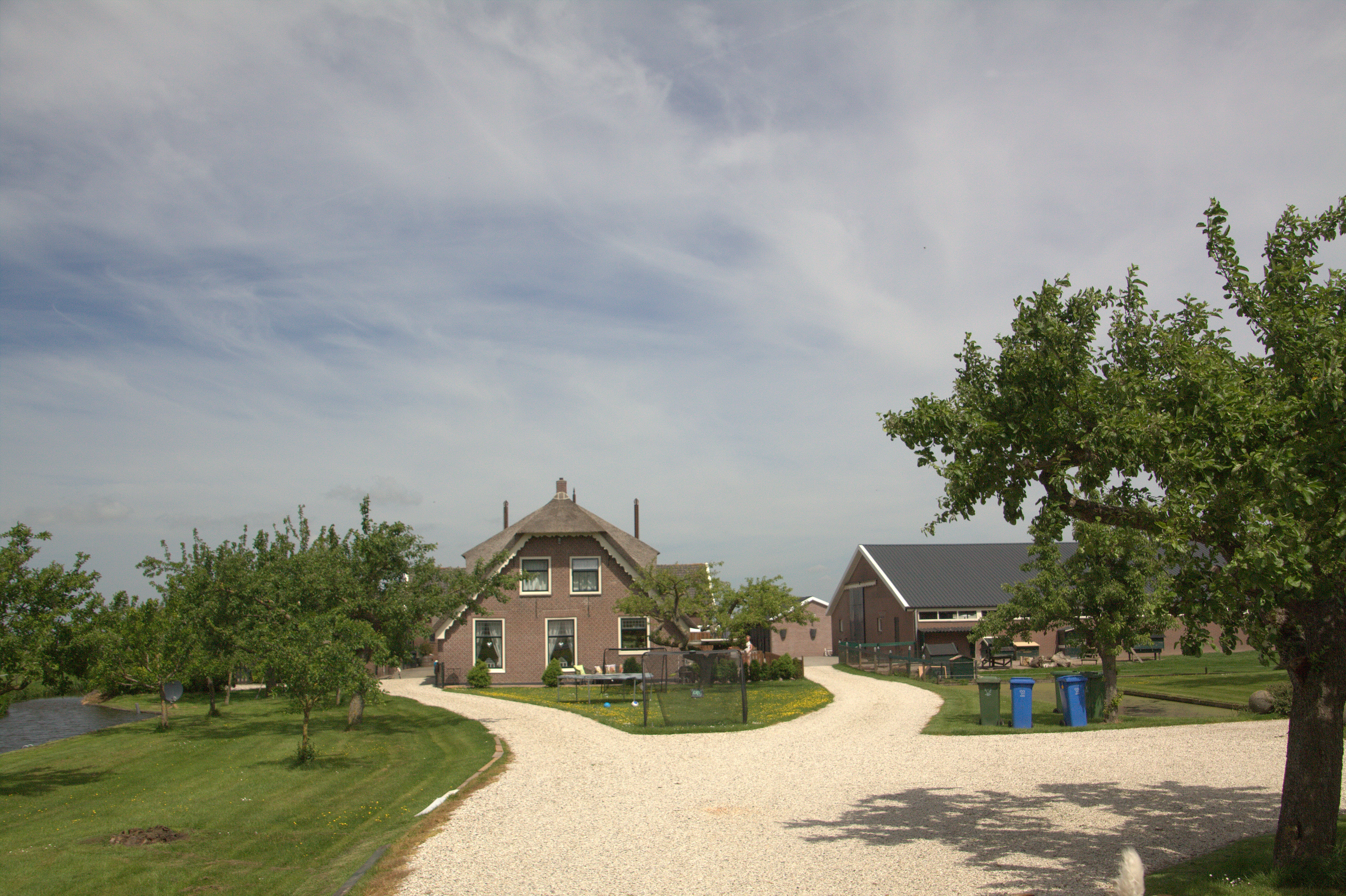
- Farm in Rietveld

- Location in the Netherlands Rietveld (Netherlands)
- Coordinates: 52°05′23″N 4°51′04″E
- Country: Netherlands
- Province: Utrecht
- Municipality: Woerden

Area
  - Total: 5.11 km^{2} (1.97 sq mi)

Population (2021)
  - Total: 275
  - Density: 53.8/km^{2} (139/sq mi)
- Time zone: UTC+1 (CET)
  - Summer (DST): UTC+2 (CEST)
- Postal code: 3443
- Dialing code: 0348

Rietveld is a hamlet in the Dutch province of Utrecht. It is a part of the municipality of Woerden, and lies about 3 km west of Woerden.

Rietveld was a separate municipality between 1817 and 1964, when it became part of Woerden. During that time, it was part of the province South Holland.

The hamlet was first mentioned in 1156 as Retfelt, and means "field with reed". There are no place name signs. In 1840, Rietveld was home to 235 people.

== Gallery ==
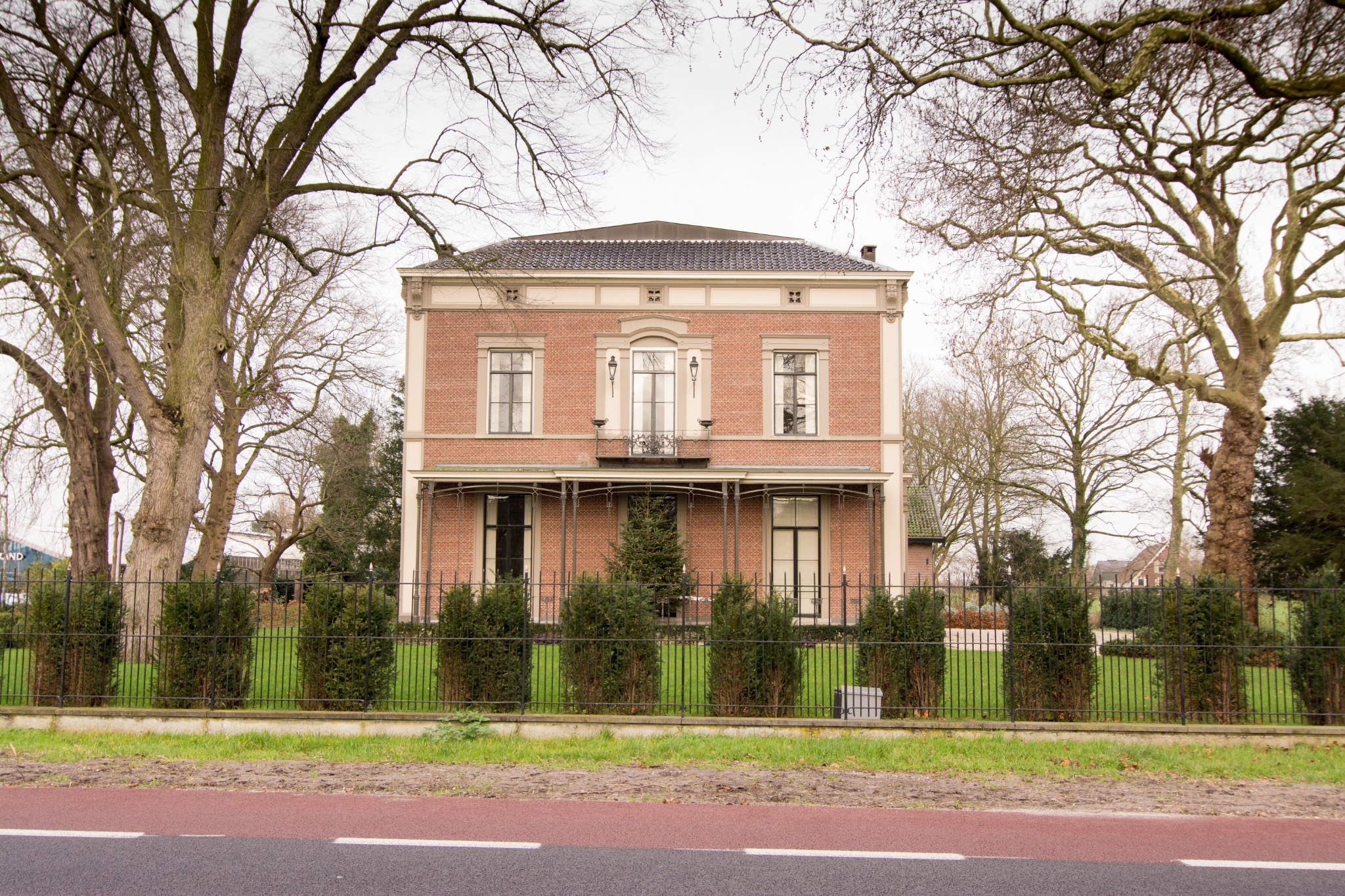
Villa Kop en Hagen

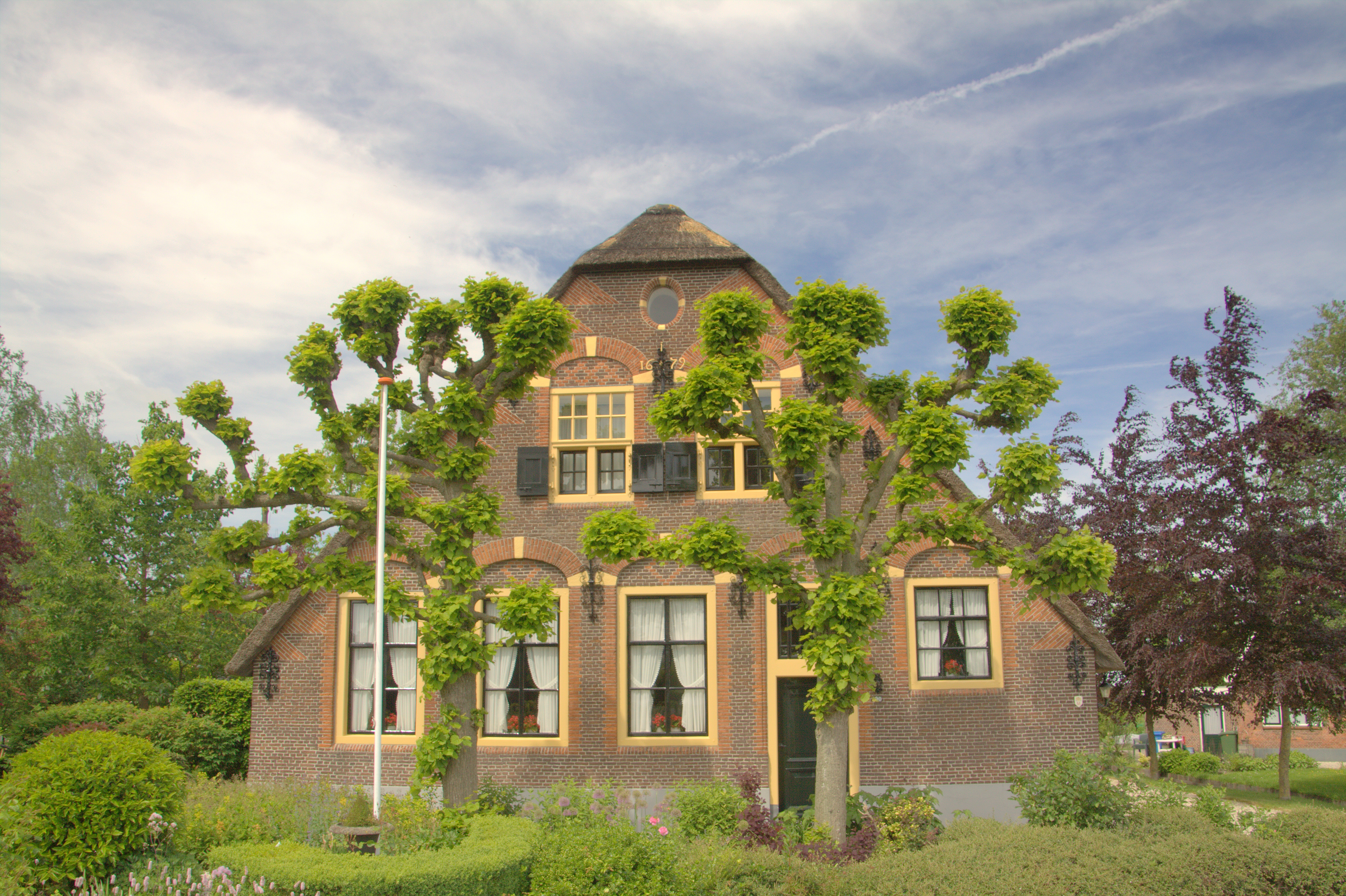
Farm from 1679 in Rietveld

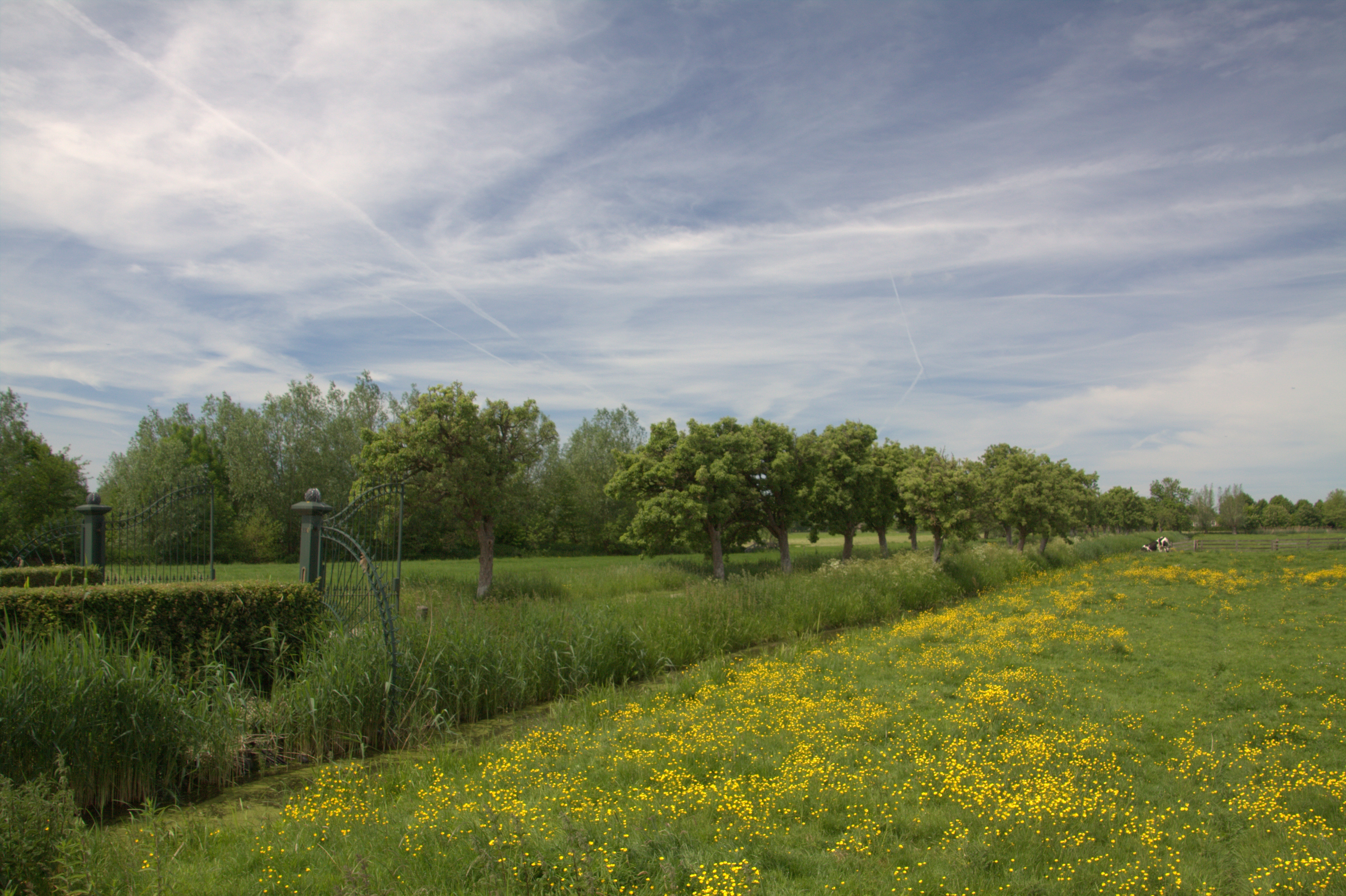
Landscape
