= Hans Bontemantel =

Dutch merchant (1613–1688)

Hans Bontemantel (24 January 1613 - 8 June 1688) was a Dutch merchant and for a long time a schepen of Amsterdam, where he was born. He also served as acting-schout in 1672, whilst he was 'president-schepen'. As a supporter of Johan de Witt's political system, he was one of the nine regenten dismissed on 10 September 1672 by stadthouder William III of Orange, at the same time as the dismissal of Lambert Reynst, Andries de Graeff and Pieter de Graeff.

Bontemantel is most notable for his writings, which include details about conflict with the government of the Dutch Republic at that time and notes on political and military issues in Amsterdam, discussions in the Estates General, anecdotes about elections for magistrate posts and details about events in the Estates' committees and figures such as Isaac Coymans, Jacob F. Hinlopen, Jacob J. Hinlopen (1621-1679), Gillis Valckenier and Cornelis Geelvinck. Bontemantel lived at Keizersgracht 107 in a house known as "de Walvis", formerly owned by Samuel Godin.
