= Perpetual Edict (1667) =

1667 resolution of the States of Holland

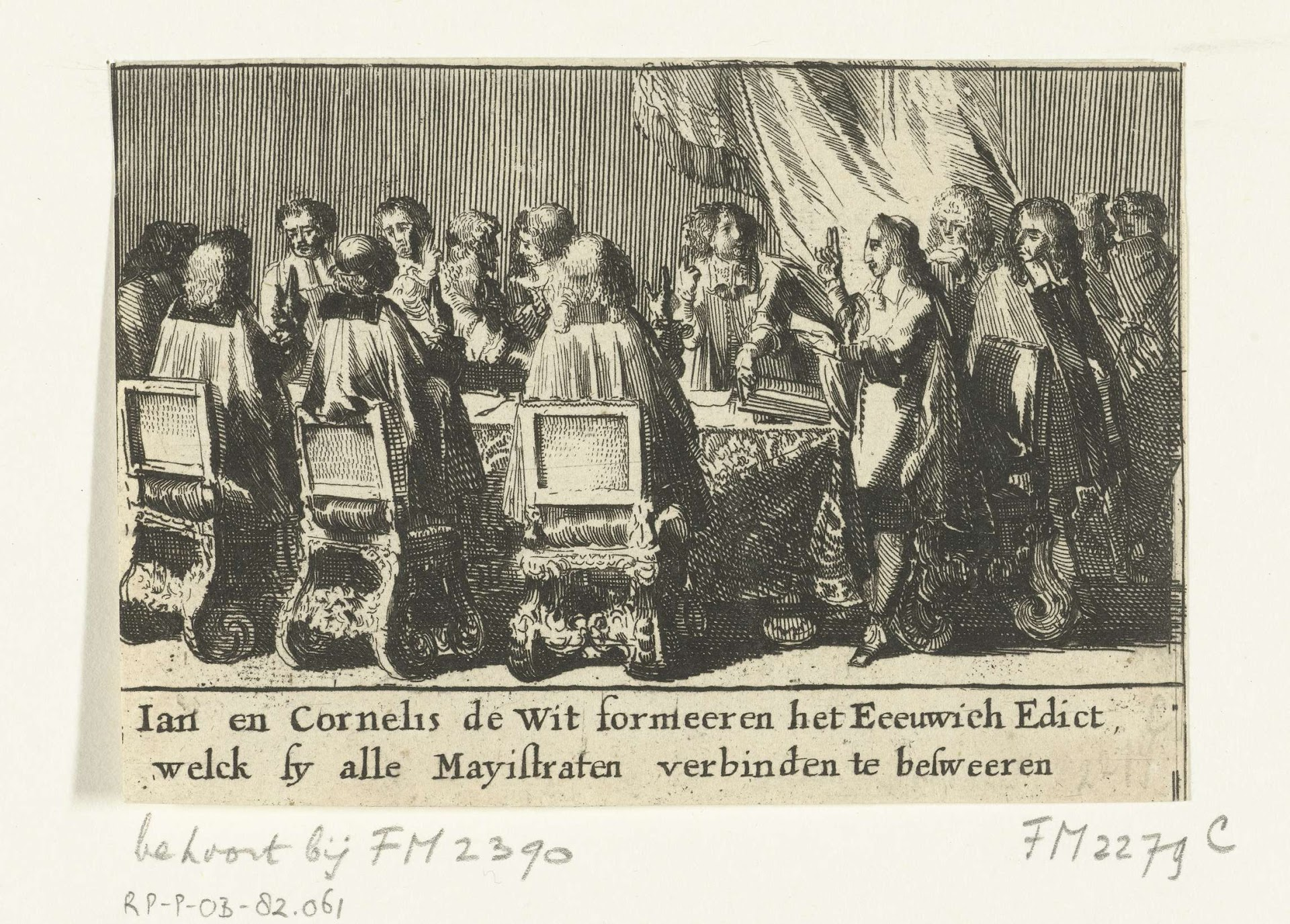
The States of Holland pass the Perpetual Edict. Romeyn de Hooghe (1675).

The Perpetual Edict (Dutch: Eeuwig Edict) was a resolution of the States of Holland passed on 5 August 1667 which abolished the office of Stadtholder in the province of Holland. At approximately the same time, a majority of provinces in the States General of the Netherlands agreed to declare the office of stadtholder (in any of the provinces) incompatible with the office of Captain general of the Dutch Republic.

The edict was intended to prevent William III, Prince of Orange from claiming the office of Stadtholder in the province of Holland for himself. The previous Act of Seclusion (1654) was intended to exclude all members of the House of Orange from being appointed to the office, but this act had been revoked in 1660.

== Background ==
During the First Stadtholderless Period, the States-Party faction of the Dutch Regents, led by Grand Pensionary Johan de Witt and his uncle Cornelis de Graeff, tried to prevent the elevation of young William III, Prince of Orange to the office of Stadtholder in the province of Holland. After the Treaty of Westminster (1654) they enacted the Act of Seclusion, which would prevent a member of the House of Orange being appointed to the office, without abolishing the office itself. This Act was revoked in 1660, after the Restoration of William's uncle Charles II of England. Since then there had been increasing agitation by the Orangist adherents of the Prince to give him a high office, like a seat in the Raad van State.

== Chronology ==
In July 1667, just before the Treaty of Breda (1667) ended the Second Anglo-Dutch War De Witt presented a political compromise to the States of Holland in which he proposed that William would be assigned a seat in the Raad van State, and would be appointed Captain-general, but only on reaching the age of majority: 23, not 18, as the Orangists wanted. All of this on condition that William would be excluded from the stadtholderate in every province (In Friesland and Groningen William's cousin Henry Casimir II, Count of Nassau-Dietz was already stadtholder).

To this proposal an addendum was added by Gaspar Fagel, then Pensionary of Haarlem, Gillis Valckenier and Andries de Graeff, two prominent Amsterdam regents, which abolished the stadtholderate in Holland "for ever." The new law, entitled "Perpetual Edict ... for the Preserving of Freedom" was enacted on 5 August 1667. The three main points were abolition of the stadtholderate, permanent separation of the offices of captain-general of the Union and stadtholder (in all provinces), and the formal transfer of the prerogatives of the Stadtholder of Holland to the provincial States (confirming the transfer that had provisionally been made in December 1650, after the death of William II of Orange).

A new oath of office was introduced for magistrates in Holland who were now required to swear to uphold the Perpetual Edict. This met with much resistance of some of the Orangist city governments, because those opposed the doctrine of provincial supremacy espoused by the De Witt regime. The city of Leiden (a hotbed of Orangism), for instance, asserted that ultimately the city governments were sovereign, so that the States could not prescribe such an oath to its magistrates.

By January 1668 the provinces of Utrecht, Gelderland, and Overijssel agreed to accept the political compromise, and it was enacted with four votes against three (Zeeland, Friesland and Groningen) by the States-General of the Netherlands. This caused much Orangist unrest in the provinces that had voted in favor. Meanwhile, the Orangists manoeuvred to strengthen the position of the Prince. In October 1668, the Prince's grandmother Amalia of Solms-Braunfels resigned her guardianship to signify that he had come of age. Already in September 1668, the States of Zeeland had reinstated him as the First Noble of the province. Holland refused to recognize these steps, and blocked his appointment to the Raad van State throughout 1669.

== Aftermath ==
However, with the deteriorating relations with France and the threat of war, De Witt's position weakened. He managed to have the Valckenier-faction purged from the Amsterdam vroedschap in February 1671, which brought the extreme States-Party faction of Andries de Graeff to power there, but this was not enough to bolster De Witt's position in the States of Holland. More and more cities urged appointment of the Prince as captain-general. Seeing that he could not prevent this, De Witt temporized by proposing appointment for only one year. This the Prince refused. After more haggling Holland eventually gave in, and William was appointed captain-general on 24 February 1672 by the States-General.

On 8 April 1672, France declared war, shortly thereafter followed by England, the Prince-Bishopric of Münster and the Electorate of Cologne. The war developed disastrously for the Republic. As a consequence popular demand for the retraction of the Perpetual Edict became irresistible. On 2 July 1672 the States of Zeeland (not signatories of the Edict) appointed William stadtholder in their province. The next day the States of Holland set aside the Edict and also appointed William Stadtholder. De Witt resigned as Grand Pensionary on 4 August, to be replaced by Gaspar Fagel. He was murdered, together with his brother Cornelis de Witt on 20 August by an Orangist mob.

== Sources ==
- Israel, J.I. (1995), The Dutch Republic: Its Rise, Greatness and Fall, 1477-1806, Oxford University Press,ISBN 0-19-873072-1 hardback, ISBN 0-19-820734-4 paperback
