= Andries de Graeff =

Dutch statesman (1611–1678)

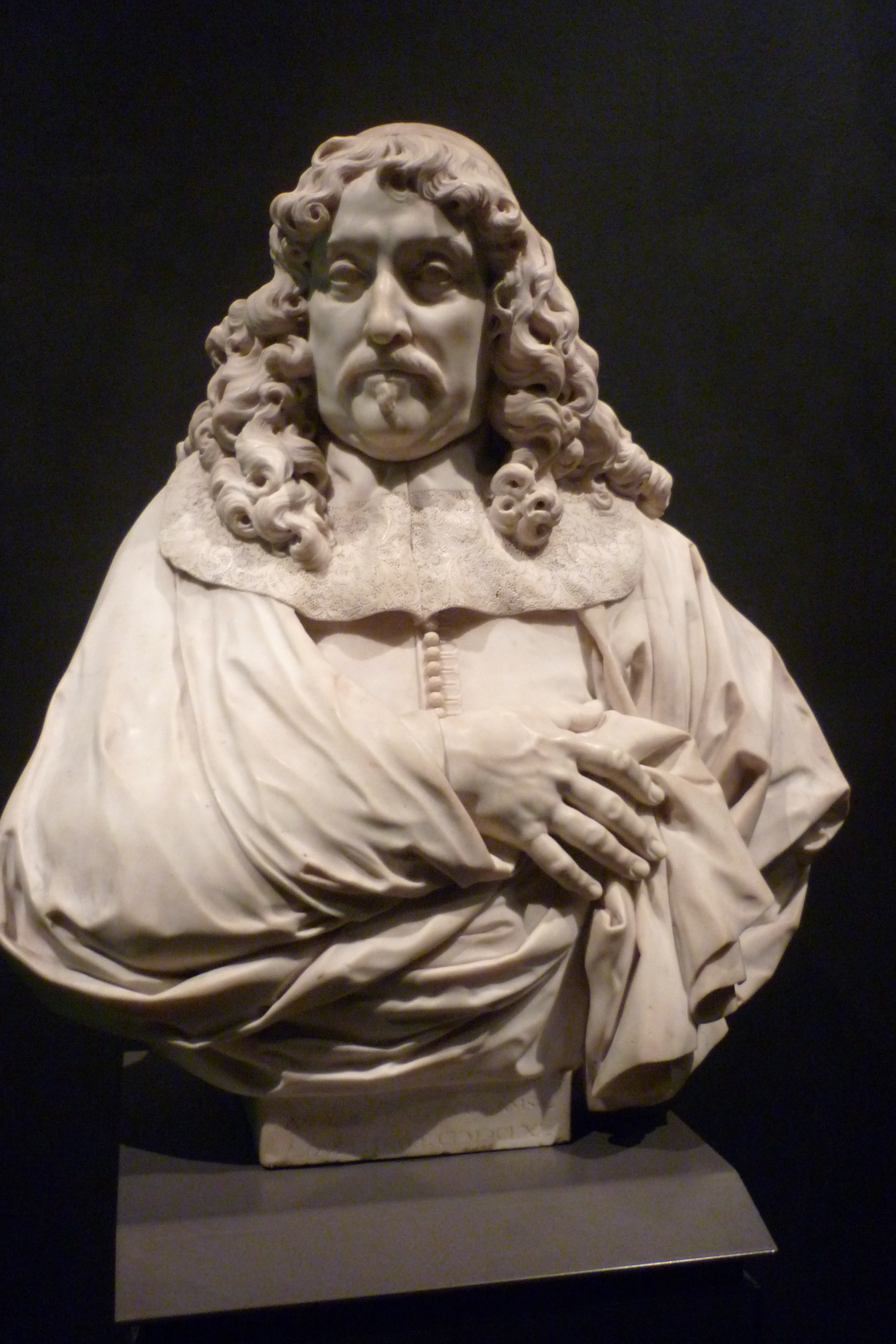
- Andries de Graeff (1661) by Artus Quellinus

Statutory auditor of the Court of Audit of Holland and West-Friesland
- In office 1652–1657
- Preceded by: Adriaan Pauw
- Succeeded by: Jacob de Witt

Regent and burgomaster of Amsterdam
- In office 1657 (1st) – 1672 (last)
- Preceded by: Cornelis de Graeff
- Succeeded by: Gillis Valckenier and Coenraad van Beuningen

Personal details
- Born: 19 February 1611 Amsterdam
- Died: 30 November 1678 (aged 67) Amsterdam
- Party: States Faction
- Spouse: Elisabeth Bicker van Swieten
- Relations: Cornelis de Graeff (brother); Andries Bicker (cousin); Jan de Witt (nephew); Cornelis de Witt (nephew); Pieter Corneliszoon Hooft (uncle)
- Children: Cornelis, Alia and Arnoldina (Aertje)
- Occupation: Regent / Mayor and Landlord
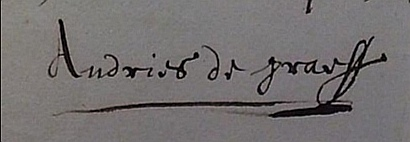
- Signature

Andries de Graeff (19 February 1611 – 30 November 1678) was a regent and burgomaster (mayor) of Amsterdam and leading Dutch statesman during the Golden Age.

He came from the De Graeff family, which, together with the Bicker family by marriage, held political power in Amsterdam, Holland, and ultimately in the Republic of the Seven United Provinces. He was a member of a family of regents who belonged to the republican political movement also referred to as the ‘state oriented’, the Dutch States Party, as opposed to the Orangisten and opponent of the political ambitions of the House of Orange.

At the height of the Dutch Golden Age, during the First Stadtholderless Period from 1650 to the Rampjaar 1672, political power within Holland rested primarily with two republican and state-minded families. In Amsterdam this lay with the brothers Andries and Cornelis de Graeff, and in The Hague with the brothers Cornelis and Johan de Witt, the leaders of Holland's pro-state faction, which was reinforced by their close collaboration and mutual kinship. Andries de Graeff was one of the leading figures seeking to end the Eighty Years' War between the United Netherlands and the Kingdom of Spain. This took place in 1648 with the Peace of Münster. After his brother's death in 1664, he took over the leadership of the De Graeff faction and continued his politics. Andries was called the last mayor from the dynasty of the "Graven", who was powerful and able enough to rule the city of Amsterdam. His political stance was characteristic of his family: on the one hand libertine and state-minded, on the other hand, if only to a limited extent, loyal to the House of Orange. The proponents of the De Graeff family has shown they had an eye for national politics and tried to find some balance between the House of Orange and the Republicans. They were against too much influence of the church on political issues.

Together with his brother Cornelis de Graeff he became an illustrious Patron and Art collector of various artists and poets of the Dutch Golden Age. His patronage consisted of commissions to artists such as Rembrandt, Artus Quellinus, Gerard ter Borch and Govert Flinck for the portraits of himself and his family. He was also sung about by poets such as Joost van den Vondel and Jan Vos.

== Family De Graeff ==
=== Origin ===
Andries de Graeff was born in Amsterdam, the third son of Jacob Dircksz de Graeff and Aaltje Boelens Loen, great-great-granddaughter of the important late medieval Amsterdam city regent and burgomaster Andries Boelens. His father was of free-thinking, republican sentiment, but also known for his obsession with fame. He was one of the leading Remonstrant and state-loving patricians, who was nevertheless not a principled anti-Orangist (supporters if the House of Orange-Nassau). He honored the inheritance of his father, Dirck Jansz Graeff, who was on friendly terms with William the Silent of Orange. The young De Graeffs were influenced by their father's antagonistic attitude towards political issues.

The relationship between the leading patriciat was very close. Three of Andries' siblings married members of the Bicker family, and so did Andries as the fourth. His older sister Agneta de Graeff van Polsbroek married Jan Bicker. The couple had Wendela Bicker and Jacoba Bicker among others; Wendela married to Grand pensionary Johan de Witt and Jacoba to De Graeffs nephew Pieter de Graeff. His close relatives included also Hollands writer and poet Pieter Corneliszoon Hooft as one of his uncles, the influential Amsterdam burgomasters and statesmen Andries, Cornelis, Jan Bicker who were his cousins, and burgomaster Frans Banning Cocq (captain of Rembrandt's painting The Night Watch), who was his brother-in-law. A more distant relative für example was his second cousin burgomaster Joan Huydecoper van Maarsseveen

==== Genealogical and political Legacy ====
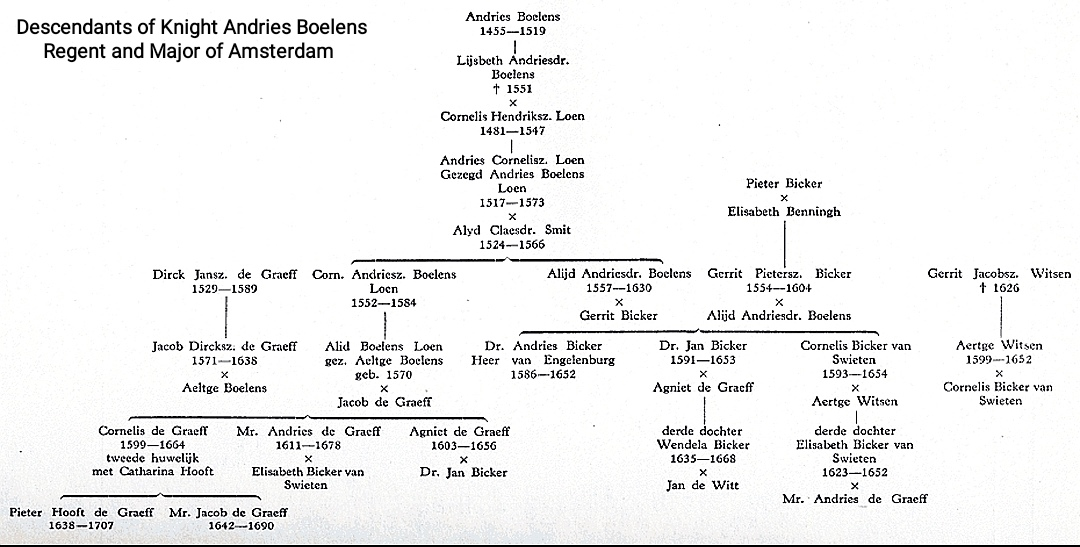
Descendants of Andries Boelens. Overview of the personal family relationships of the Amsterdam oligarchy between the regent-dynasties Boelens Loen, De Graeff, Bicker (van Swieten), Witsen and Johan de Witt in the Dutch Golden Age

The De Graeff family therefore never boasted about the age of their own family in Amsterdam. But Andries and his brother Cornelis de Graeff together with their cousins Andries and Cornelis Bicker, saw themselves as the political heirs of the old regent family Boelens, whose main lineage, which had remained catholic, had died out in the male line in 1647. They had received the very significant first names Andries and Cornelis from their Boelens ancestors. As in a real dynasty, members of the two families frequently intermarried in the 17th century in order to keep their political and commercial capital together. Its great historical ancestor was Andries Boelens (1455-1519), the city's most influential medieval mayor. Both families, Bicker and De Graeff, descend in the female line from Boelens. He was allowed to hold the highest office in Amsterdam fifteen times.

==== Von Graben connection ====
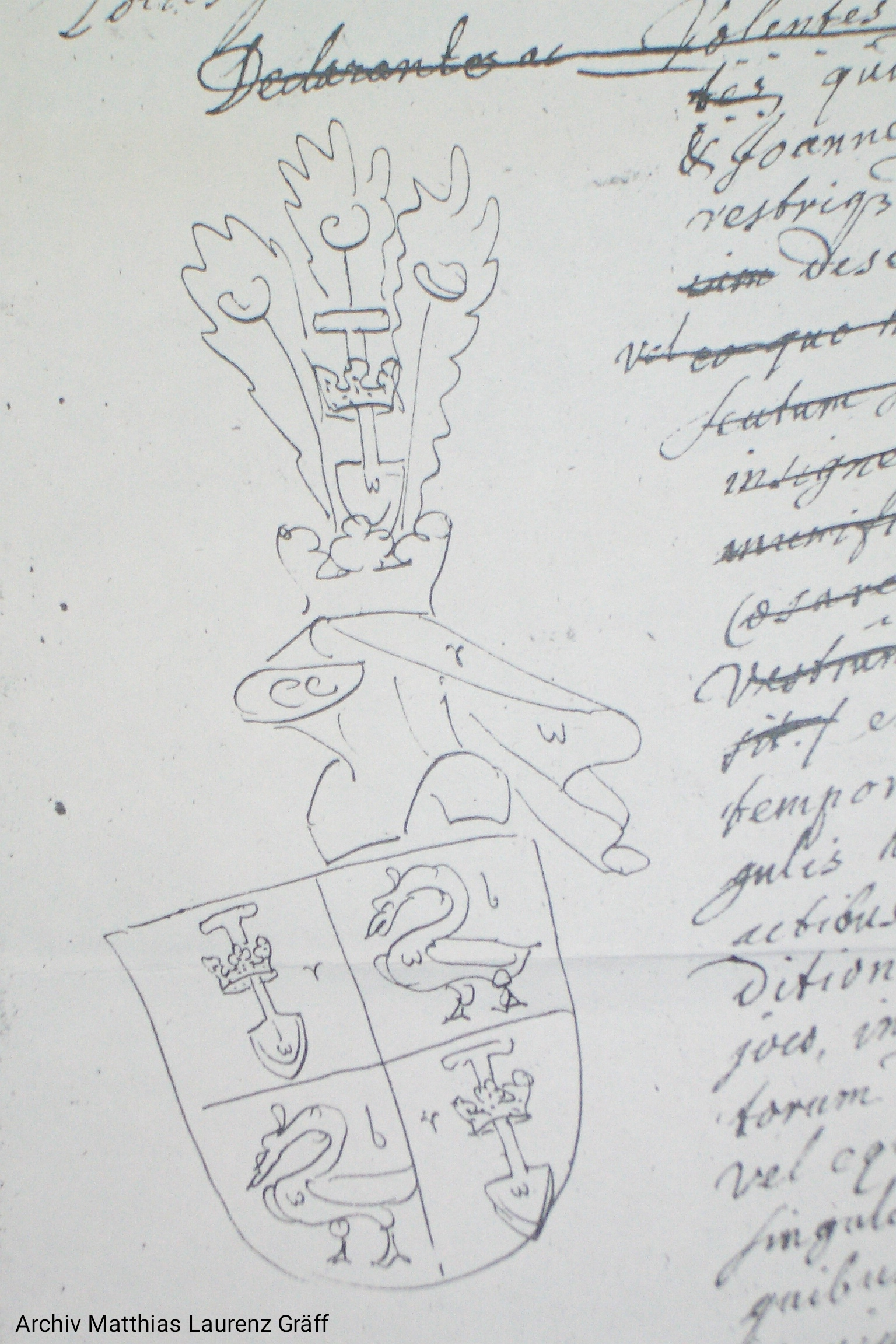
Coat of Arms as knight of the Holy Roman Empire, diplom July 19th 1677 (archiv Matthias Laurenz Gräff)

Shortly before Andries, the "Edle Herr von Graef(f)", died in end of 1678, he and his only adult son, Cornelis de Graeff, were raised to the German Imperial Knighthood by Emperor Leopold I and their coat of arms improved. The reason was a relationship claimed by De Graeff to the noble family Von Graben, but this was doubted by his political opponents during De Graeff's lifetime. With Wolfgang von Graben and his son Peter von Graben (* around 1450/1460), family members from Laibach (Ljubljana) came to Holland around 1476 [reported also in 1483] in the entourage of Archduke Maximilian of Austria [the later Emperor]. The latter had just acquired Holland by marrying Mary of Burgundy. Margarethe von Croppenstein is reported as Peter's mother, but this cannot be correct, since she is mentioned as the wife of a Wolfgang von Graben, but only in the 16th century, which therefore applies to a later Wolfgang von Graben. Wolfgang entered the military service and was assigned to the archduke. Peter took the name Pieter (de) Graeff (or De Graaff), and also appears as the progenitor of the De Graeff family. De Graeff was the Dutch spelling of Von Graben during the 14th and 15th century. In the Diploma of Nobility loaned to Andries de Graeff, it was affirmed that the family de Graeff was formerly called von Graben, which is the same as de Graeff. He also appears as the first known bearer of the Graeffsche/Grabenschen (family) coat of arms with the silver spade on a red background and the silver bird [swan] on a blue background. This family today shows the same coat of arms as the De Graeff family. However, the Dutch Nieuw Nederlandsch Biographical Woordenboek doubts this family constellation: A certain Wolfgang von Graben, who came to Holland around 1483, is said to have married there and had a son Pieter, who is said to be the progenitor of the Dutch family... That diplome dadet from 19 July 1677. Diplom loaned to Andries de Graeff:

"Fide digis itegur genealogistarum Amsteldamensium edocti testimoniis te Andream de Graeff [Andries de Graeff] non paternum solum ex pervetusta in Comitatu nostro Tyrolensi von Graben dicta familia originem ducere, qua olim per quendam ex ascendentibus tuis ejus nominis in Belgium traducta et in Petrum de Graeff [Pieter Graeff], abavum, Johannem [Jan Pietersz Graeff], proavum, Theodorum [Dirck Jansz Graeff], avum, ac tandem Jacobum [Jacob Dircksz de Graeff], patrem tuum, viros in civitate, Amstelodamensi continua serie consulatum scabinatus senatorii ordinis dignitabitus conspicuos et in publicum bene semper meritos propagata nobiliter et cum splendore inter suos se semper gessaerit interque alios honores praerogativasque nobilibus eo locorum proprias liberum venandi jus in Hollandia, Frisiaque occidentale ac Ultrajectina provinciis habuerit semper et exercuerit."

==== Feudality ====
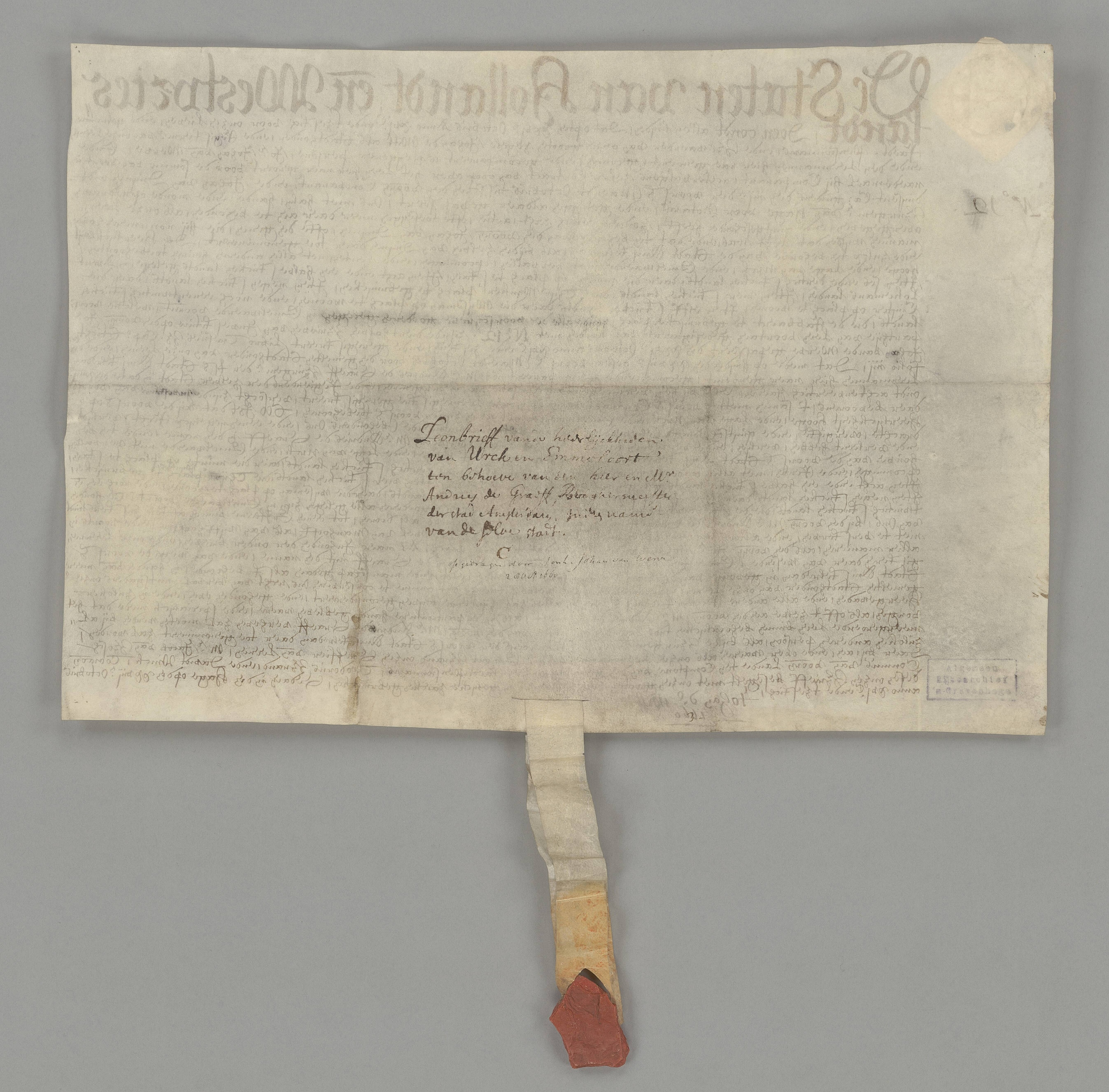
Deed of fief from the States of Holland and West Friesland for Andries de Graeff regarding the high and low Lordship of Urk and Emmeloord

In 1627/1636 Andries de Graeff inherited the manor Vredenhof (Voorschoten) from both his uncle Jan Dircksz Graeff (?–1627) and his father Jacob Dircksz de Graeff. There he had the manorial right to breed swans.

He also bought large plots of land in the Oud-Naarden (Naarden) area and thus built his country estate Graeffenveld. He had a hill built there, the Venusberg, on the top of which a lion statue was erected, and which was then called Leeuwenberg.

In 1660 De Graeff received the Lordship of Urk and Emmeloord from the States of Holland for the city of Amsterdam. Oddly enough, he received the fief as a heritage fief (tot eenen erfleenen binnen after zusters kindt, niet te versterven, ende althoos te commen op den oudsten ende naesten, alzoo wel van manhooft als van wijfhoofde). He held this administration until the Rampjaar 1672.

==== Coat of arms ====
Coat of arms

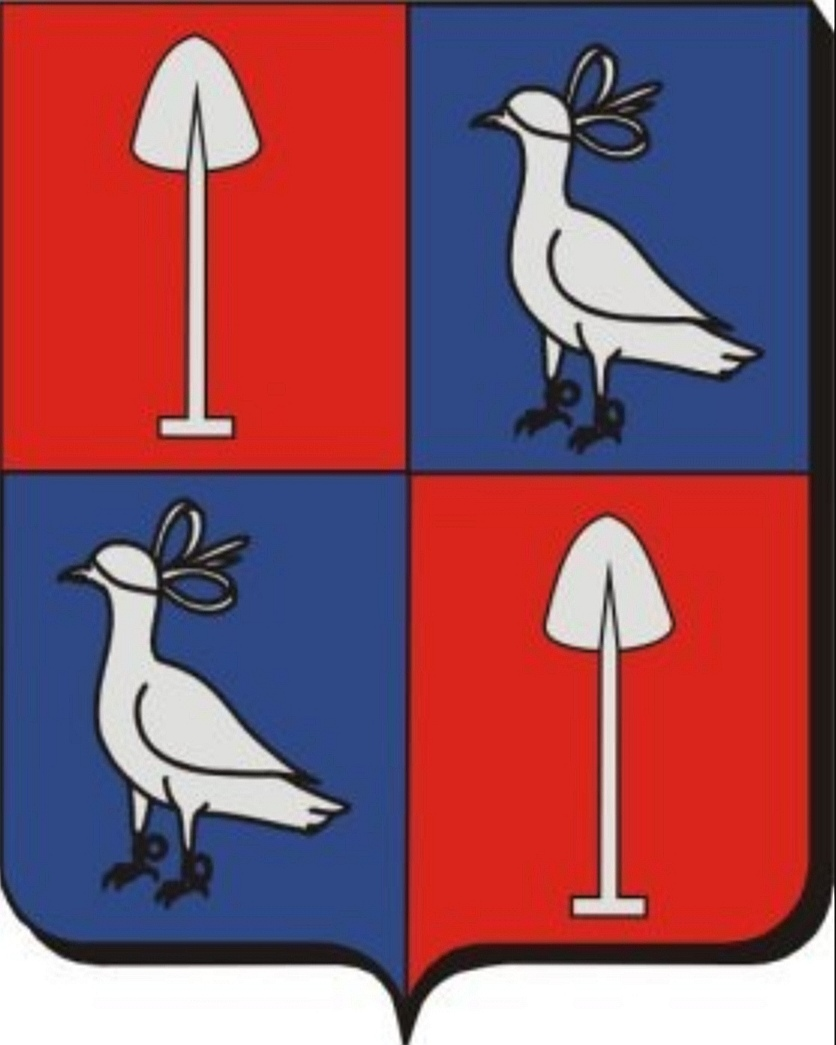
Ancient coat of arms

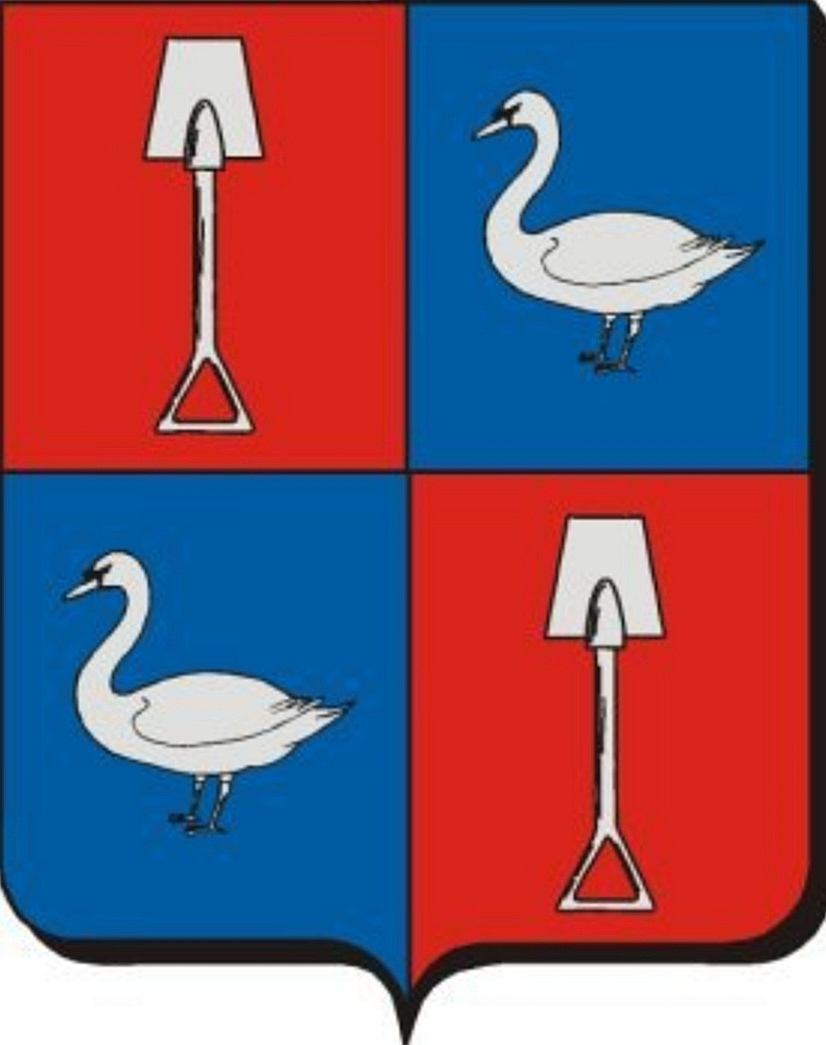
Personal coat of arms as Lord of Vredenhof (around 1638)

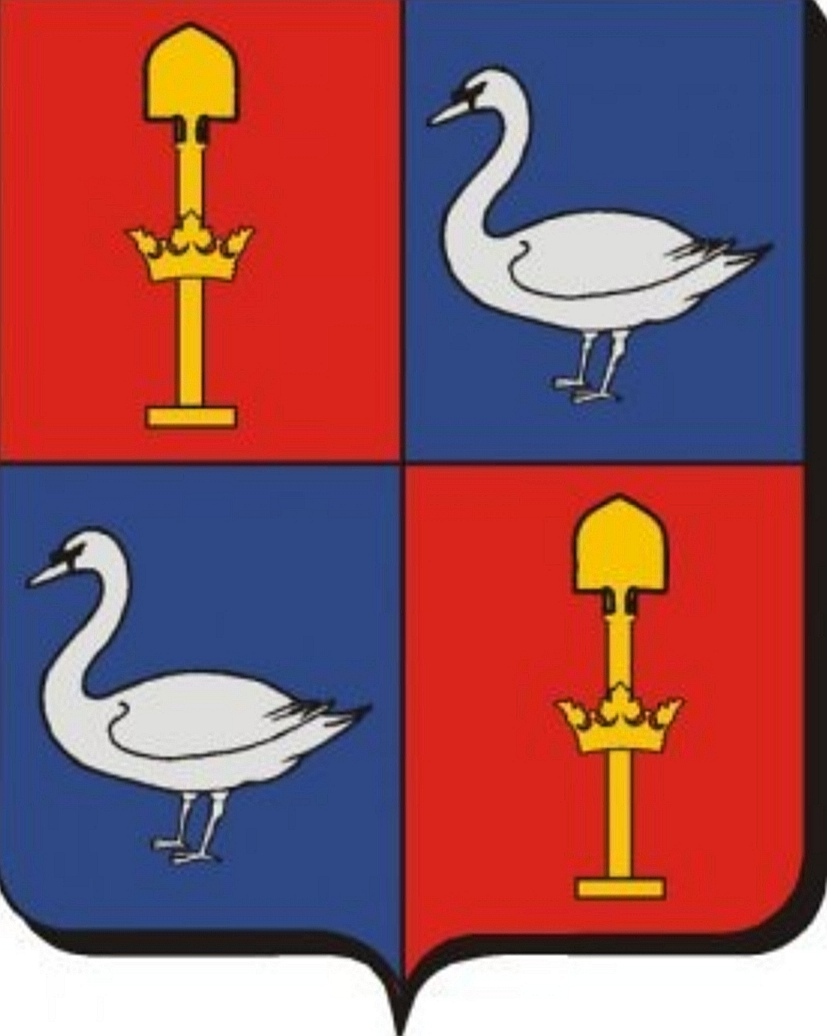
Personal coat of arms a Imperial knight and Lord of Vredenhof (1677)

Andries de Graeff's coat of arms of origin was quartered and showed the following symbols:

- field 1 (left above) the silver shovel on a red background of their paternal ancestors, the Herren von Graben
- field 2 (right above) it shows a silver falcon on a blue background. The origin of the falcon lies in the possession of the Valckeveen estate (later the Valckenburg estate) in Gooiland
- field 3 (left below), same as field 2
- field 4 (right below), same as field 1
- helmet covers in red and silver
- helm adornment shows an upright silver spade with ostrich feathers (Herren von Graben)
- motto: MORS SCEPTRA LIGONIBUS AEQUAT (DEATH MAKES SEPTRES AND HOES EQUAL)

The personal coat of arms of Andries de Graeff between around 1638 and 1677 is quartered and shows the following symbols:

- field 1 (left above) shows the silver shovel on red of their paternal ancestors, the Herren von Graben
- field 2 (right above) shows the silver swan on blue of the Fief Vredenhof
- field 3 (left below) shows the silver swan of their maternal ancestors, the De Grebber family of Waterland
- field 4 (right below), same as field 1
- helmet covers in red and silver
- helm adornment shows an upright silver spade with ostrich feathers (Herren von Graben)
- motto: MORS SCEPTRA LIGONIBUS AEQUAT (DEATH MAKES SEPTRES AND HOES EQUAL)

In 1677 Andries de Graeff was awarded the imperial knighthood and his coat of arms increased. His coat of arms was crowned, and the two shovels in the coat of arms were also gilded and additionally hung with golden crowns.

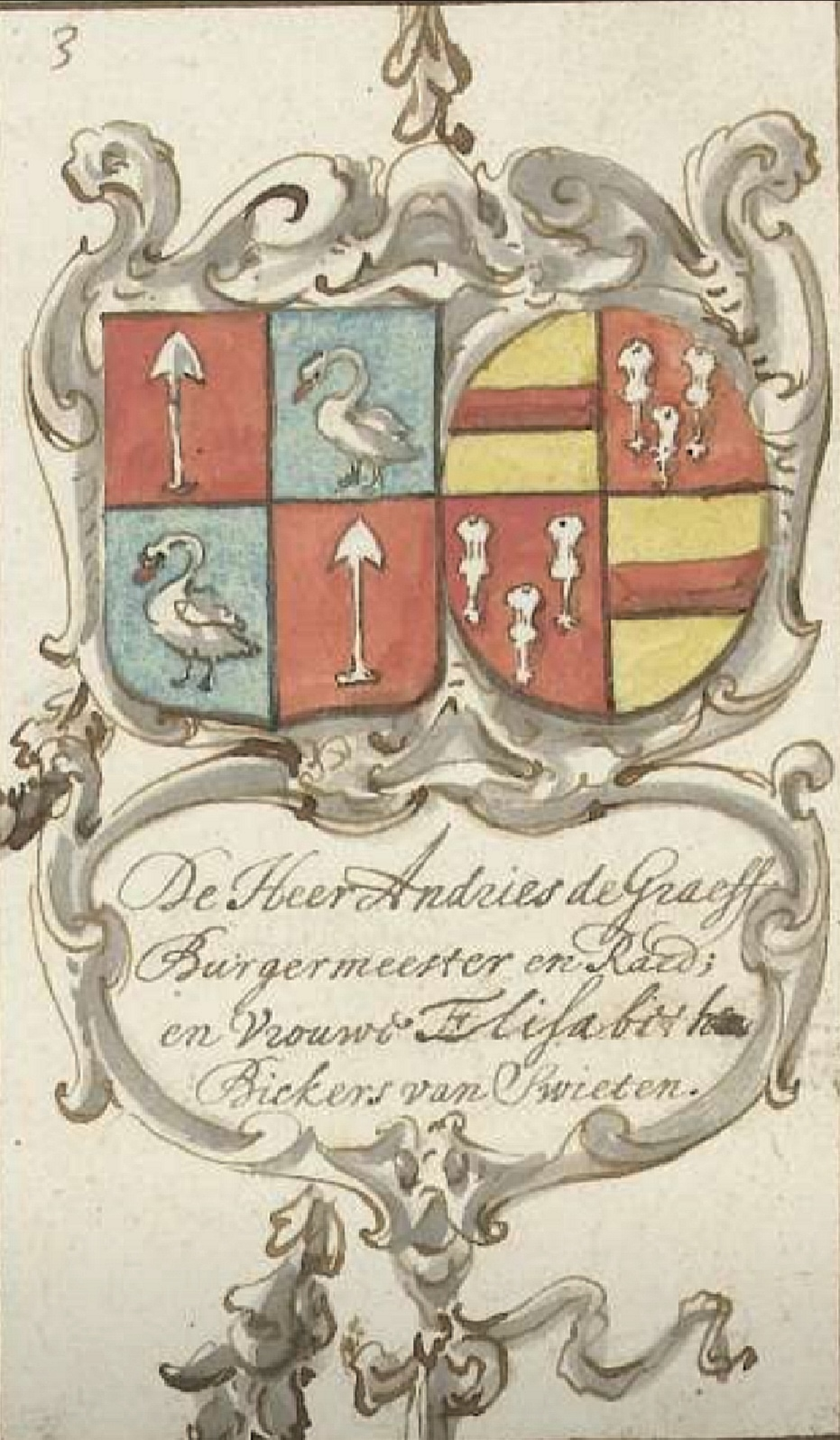
Marriage crest of Andries de Graeff and Elisabeth Bicker van Swieten (1646)

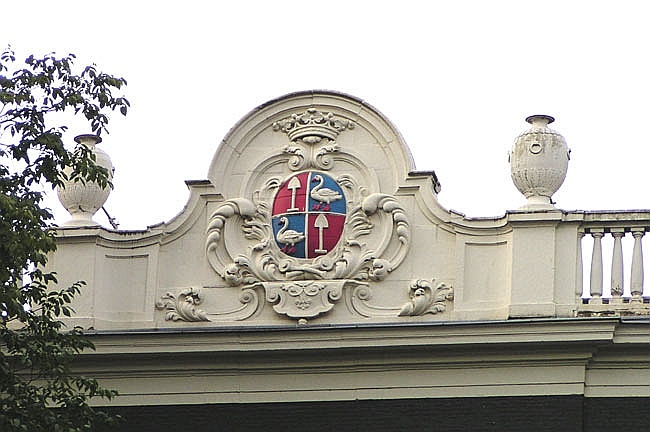
Coat of arms on his townhouse Huis van der Graeff, Amsterdam (1672)

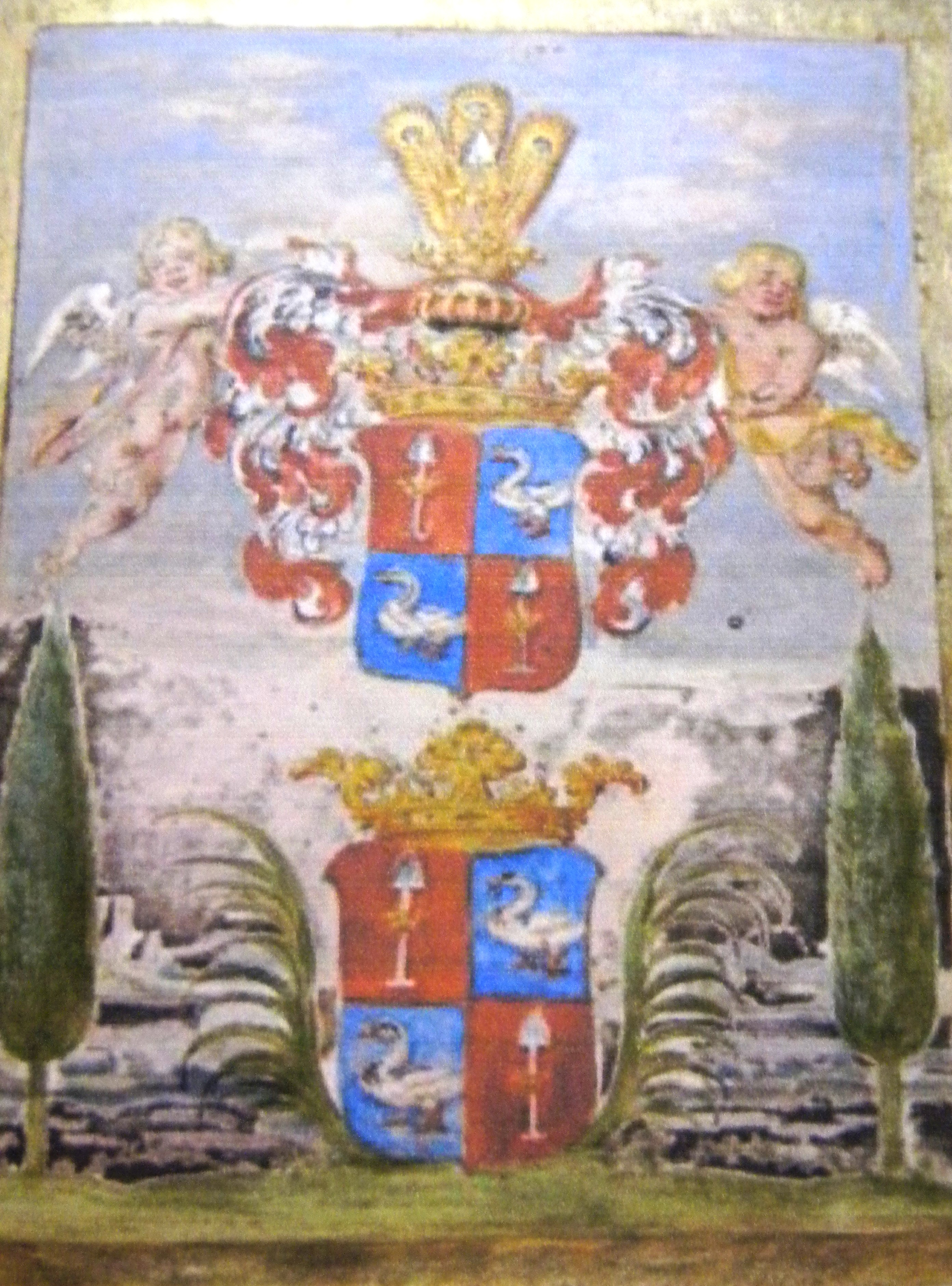
Coat of arms as imperial knight (1677)

=== Marriage and progeny ===
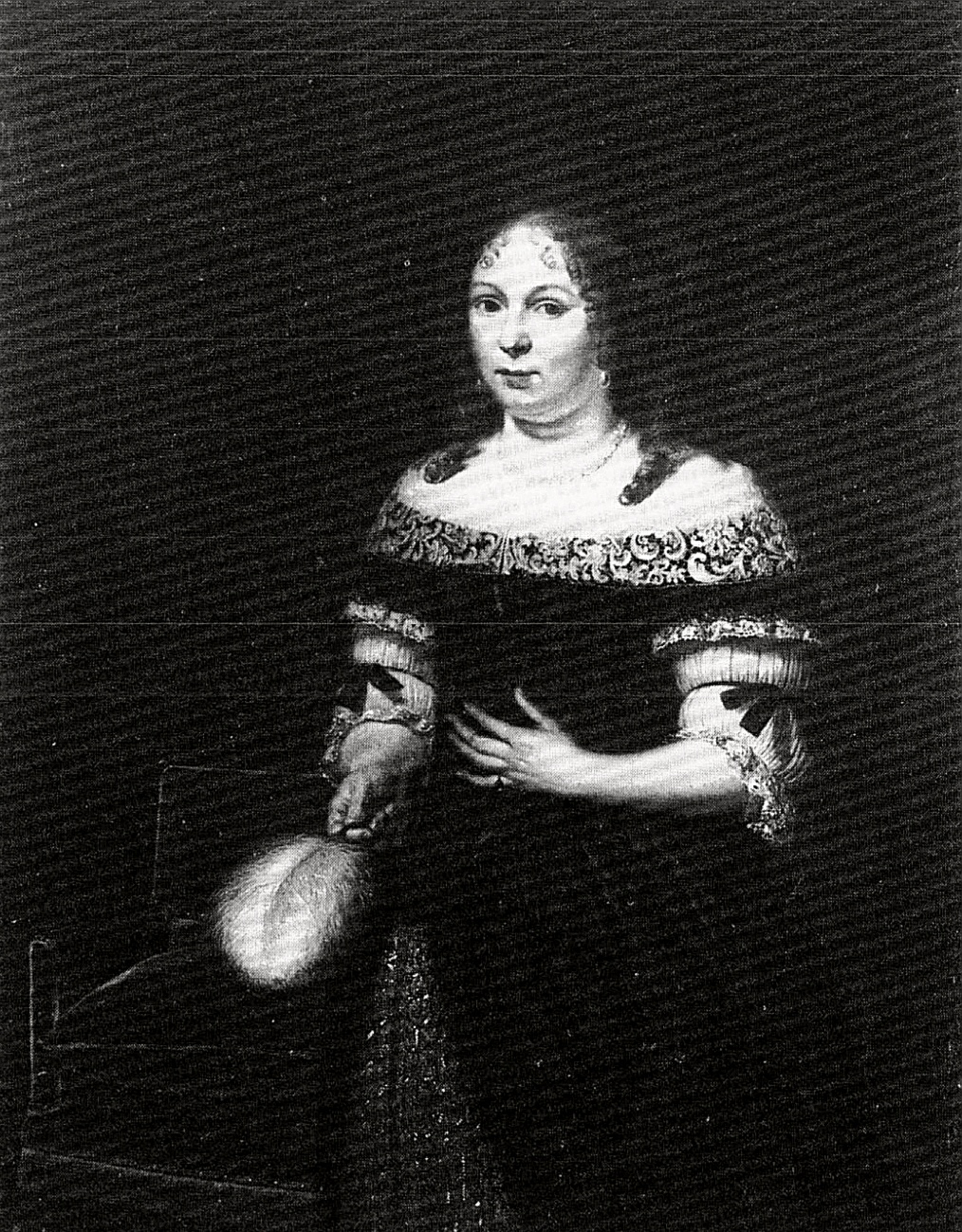
Elisabeth Bicker van Swieten, full niece, second cousin and wife of Andries de Graeff

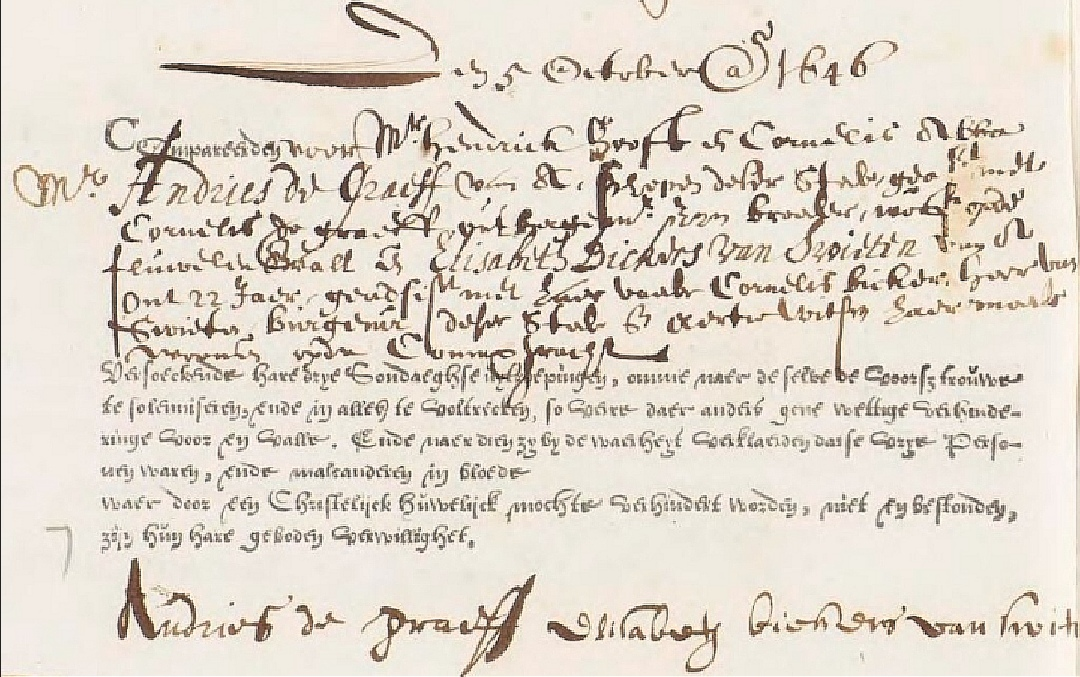
Marriage certificate Andries de Graeff and Elisabeth Bicker van Swieten

In 1646 Andries de Graeff married Elisabeth Bicker van Swieten (1623-1656), who was both his full niece and the daughter of his cousin burgomaster Cornelis Bicker van Swieten. This connection was possibly promoted by his brother Cornelis de Graeff and his cousin Andries Bicker. Through his marriage he became a brother-in-law of burgomaster and statesman Cornelis Geelvinck, burgomaster Lambert Reynst and his own nephew Gerard Bicker (I) van Swieten. He also became a cousin-in-law to later Danish baron Joachim Irgens von Westervick, owner of the private Irgens Estate, which was a huge part of Northern Norway.

The couple Andries and Elisabeth had four children:

- Cornelis de Graeff (1650–1678) m. 1675 Agneta Deutz, daughter of Cornelis' uncle, the important financier Jean Deutz (brother-in-law of Cornelis' own cousin Grand pensionary Johan de Witt) and his multiple aunt Geertruida Bicker
- Alida de Graeff (1651–1738), m. 1678 Diederik van Veldhuyzen (1651–1716), Lord of Heemstede, patrician and politician of Utrecht, President and Councilor of the States of Utrecht
- Arnoldina de Graeff (1652–1703) m. 1681 Transisalanus Adolphus Baron van Voorst tot Hagenvoorde, Vrijheer of Jaarsveld, member of the Knighthood of Holland, confidant and steward of stadholder-king William III and lieutenant-stadtholder of Gorinchem; son of Hidde van Voorst and Joanna van Haersolte tot Staverden en Bredenhorst, vrouwe van Staverden Bredenhorst en Zwaluwenberg (†1720), herself a daughter of Simon van Haersolte (1610-1673) and Adriana Josina Bentinck (ca 1620-ca 1685)
- Jacob de Graeff, died at early age

Andries de Graeff was also tempted to marry off his children to people from different circles. The marriages of his daughters, especially Arnoldina's with Baron Van Voorst, showed a conscious rapprochement with the Orangism camp in the republic even after his political end. Andries de Graeff was probably not as anti-Orangist as his politics would suggest. The historian Rob van der Laarse looks at these two connections, this deliberate approach to the Orange camp, but as forced marriages.

== Politics ==
=== Influence ===
The De Graeff family was in the circle of the Amsterdam oligarchy of the Golden Age and belonged to the ruling states oriented patriciate of the province of Holland. Both, Andries and his older brother Cornelis de Graeff, were critical of the Orange family's influence. Together with the Republican political leader Grand Pensionary Johan de Witt, the De Graeff-family strove for the abolition of stadtholderships, but also try to keep a good relationship with them and their sympathizers. They desired the full sovereignty of the individual regions in a form in which the Republic of the United Seven Netherlands was not ruled by a single person. Instead of a sovereign (or stadtholder) the political and military power was lodged with the States General and with the regents of the cities in Holland.

During the two decades the De Graeff family had a leading role in the Amsterdam administration, the city was at the peak of its political power. This period was also referred to by Republicans as the ‘Ware Vrijheid’ (True Freedom). It was the First Stadtholderless Period which lasted from 1650 to 1672. During these twenty years, the regents from Holland and in particular those of Amsterdam, controlled the republic. The city was flush with self-confidence and liked to compare itself to the famous Republic of Rome. Even without a stadtholder, things seemed to be going well for the Republic and its regents both politically and economically.

=== Career ===
==== Steps into politics, Peace of Münster ====
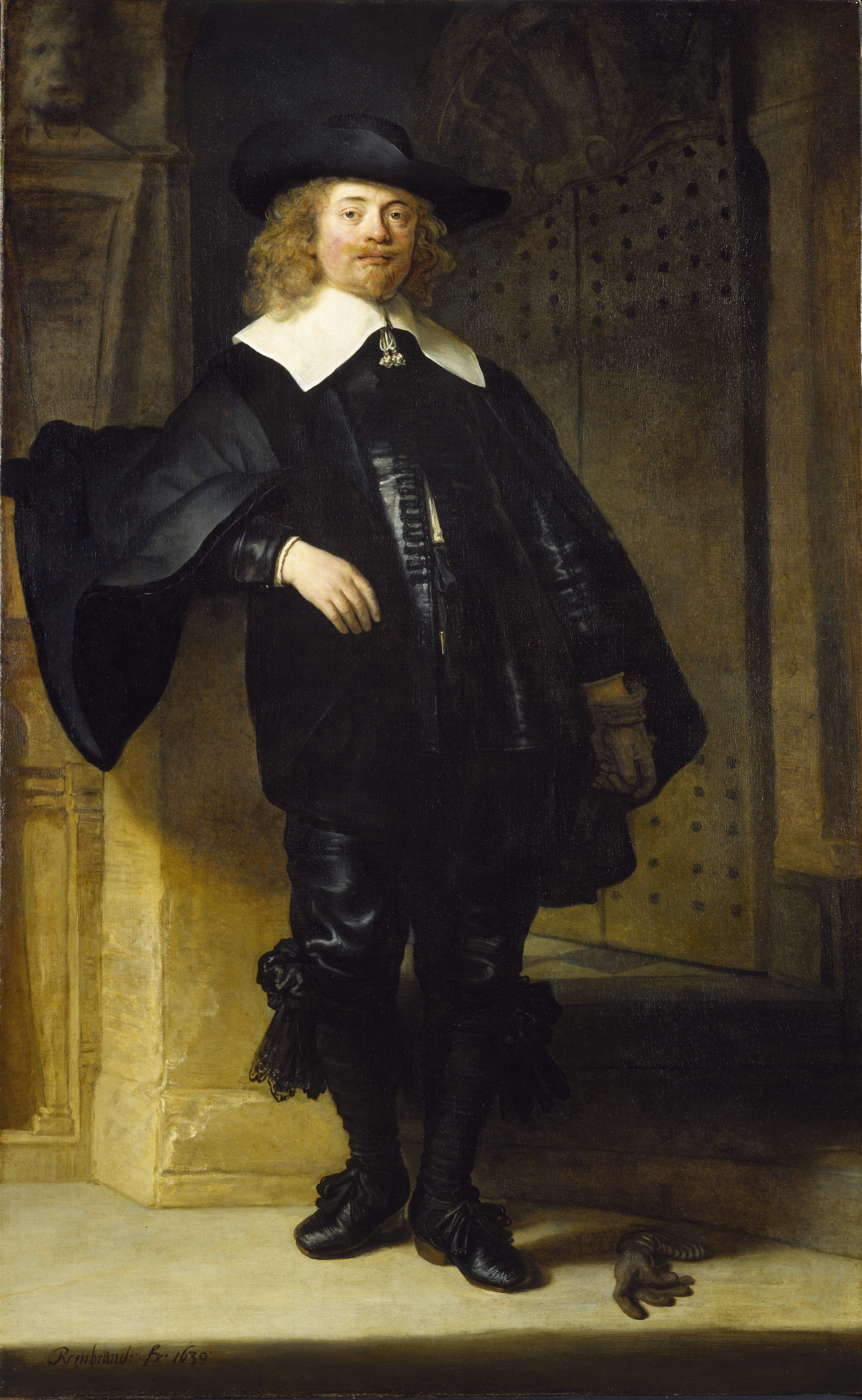
Portrait of Andries de Graeff by Rembrandt in 1639

Andries de Graeff finished his studies at the University of Poitiers in 1634 and reached a degree in canon and civil law. In 1646 he became Schepen and a member of the Vroedschap of Amsterdam, a position he retained until 1650. For the first two decades of his career, Andries de Graeff was politically overshadowed by his older brother Cornelis and their cousin Andries Bicker.

During the 1640s the republican elite of the province of Holland, the brothers Cornelis and Andries de Graeff, Jacob de Witt and the brothers Andries and Cornelis Bicker, advocated an end to the war with the Spanish Kingdom of Spain and a reduction in land forces. This ongoing state of war prevented the economic growth and social development of the United Netherlands. Also, this state of war strengthened the stadtholder's power as commander-in-chief of the armed forces, something the Republicans did not want. This intensified the conflict between them and the stadtholder Frederick Henry of Orange and the Reformed Church of Holland. In 1648, due to the immense political pressure from the entire Bicker-De Graeff clan, the United Netherlands (States General) entered into peace negotiations with Spain in order to end the Eighty Years' War with the Peace of Münster.

==== Rekenmeester of Holland ====
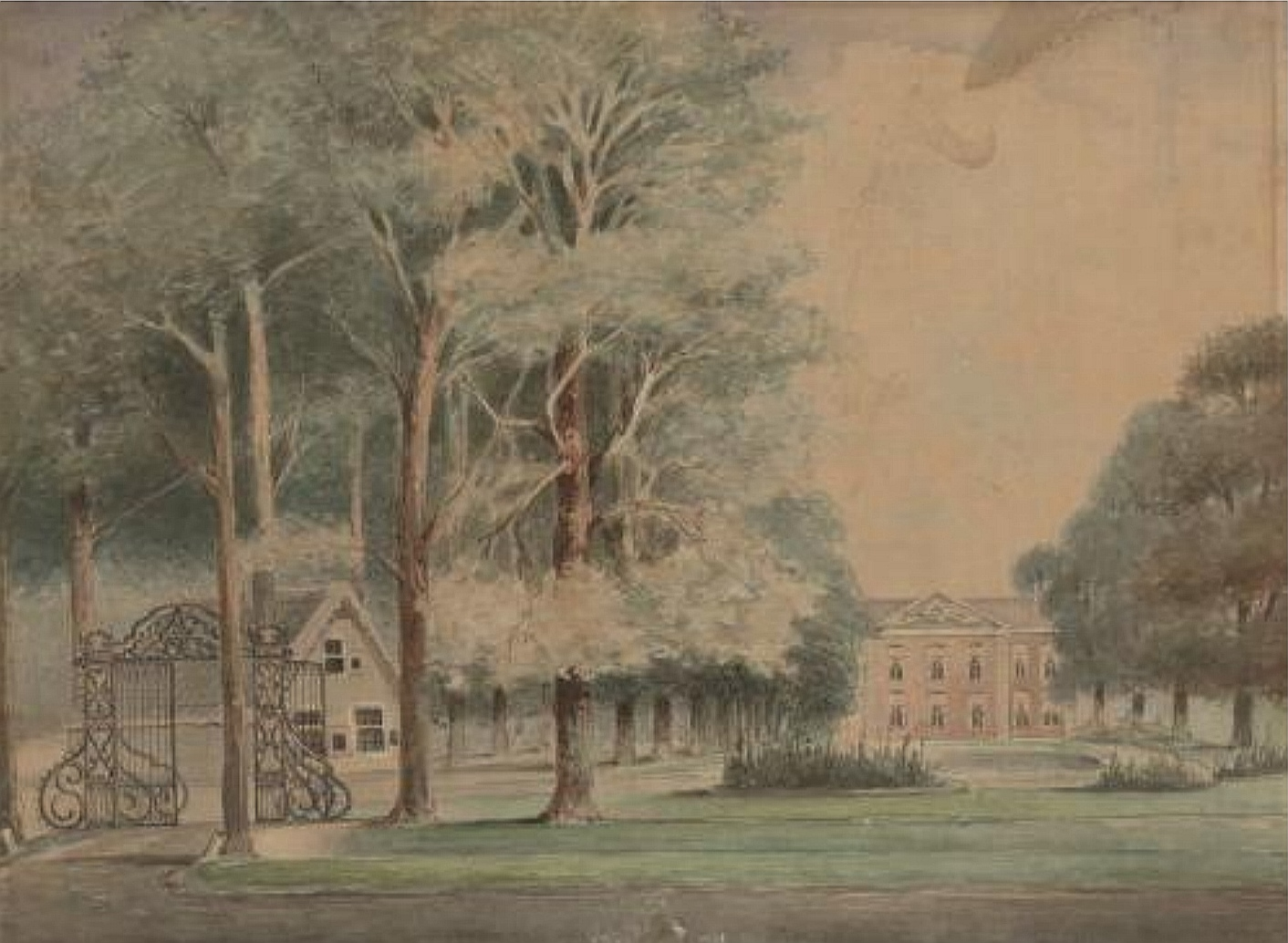
The Vredenhof estate, which De Graeff lived in while he was employed as an advisor and Statutory auditor of Holland and West-Friesland in The Hague

In 1650, Andries de Graeff took up his position as member of the Court of Audit of the Dutch Republic at The Hague and was thus able to audit the administration of the Republic and the chambers of the Admiralty on behalf of the States General. In 1652, through the mediation of his brother Cornelis, he became the chartered Statutory auditor (Rekenmeester der Grafelijke domeinen van Holland en West-Friesland Meester ordinaris der Grafelijke domeinen van Holland en West-Friesland) of the State Accounting Chamber at The Hague. He got this lucrative job because Cornelis thwarted the already established appointment of recently retired 74-years old Grand pensionary Jacob Cats. During his time as Meester ordinaris he also lived in the Vredenhof estate near Voorschoten, bought by his grandfather Dirck Jansz Graeff in 1581. There he had the manorial right to breed swans. De Graeff moved back to Amsterdam for a time in 1653. During this time he held positions as Commissioner of the Haarlemmermeer, Hoofdingeland (highest rank in dike management) of the Watergraafsmeer and Dikemaster of Nieuwer-Amstel. In 1657 he finally resigned as Rekenmeester of the Grafelijke domeinen van Holland en West-Friesland.

==== Amsterdam regent ====
===== Beginning =====
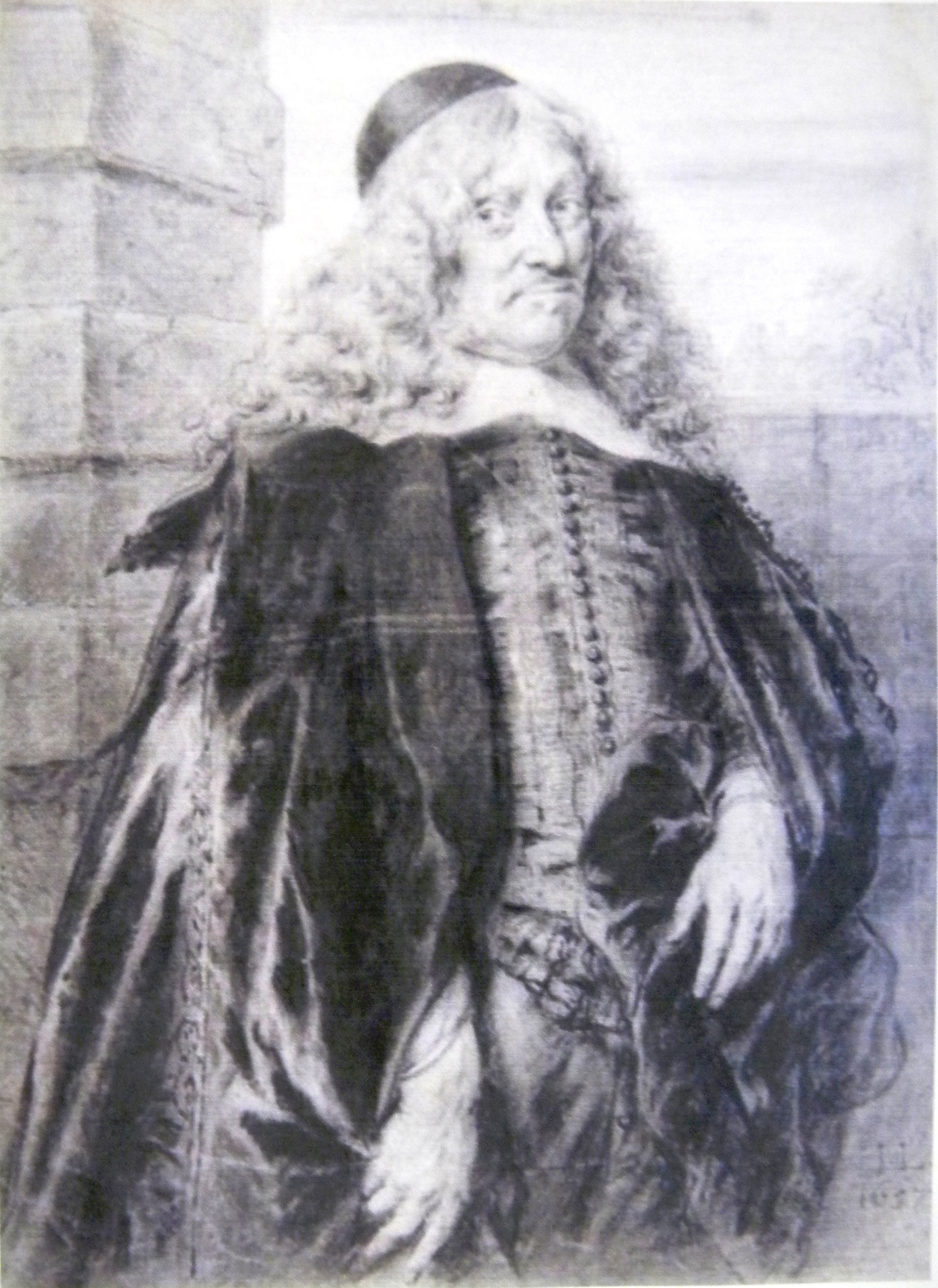
Portrait drawing of Andries de Graeff in 1657 on the occasion of his first mayoralty (by Jan Lievens)

From 1657 Andries de Graeff devoted himself to his political activities in Amsterdam, where he was first elected burgomaster (mayor). In totally he acted burgomaster seven from 1657 to 1671 in the difficult times of the First Stadtholderless Period. At that time the De Graeff faction, under his brother Cornelis de Graeff, held the government of the city in their hands. Between 1658 and 1659 Andries de Graeff was advisor of the Admiralty of Amsterdam. Other offices where Dijkgraaf of the lakes at the Amstel river and Pilotagemaster on the river Maas. De Graeff was also instrumental in the artistic decoration of the new Amsterdam City Hall op de Dam. The awarding of the art commissions was shared between a number of painters, including Jacob Jordaens and Jan Lievens, by principal burgomasters De Graeff and his 2nd cousin Joan Huydecoper van Maarsseveen. In 1660 he became Ambachtsheer of Urk and Emmeloord in what is now the province of Flevoland on behalf of the city of Amsterdam.

===== The Dutch Gift =====
In 1660/1661 the De Graeff brothers and other politicians of Holland pursued a pro-English strategy which secured them military support against Spain and free trade (vrij schip, vrij goed). For this reason, Andries and Cornelis de Graeff, in 1660 founded a commission that presented the English King Charles II with the Dutch Gift, consisting of numerous valuable paintings and works of art. The sculptures for the gift were selected by the pre-eminent sculptor in the Netherlands, Artus Quellinus, and Gerrit van Uylenburgh, the son of Rembrandt's dealer Hendrick van Uylenburgh, advised the De Graeff's and the States General of the Netherlands on the purchase. The Dutch Gift was a collection of 28 mostly Italian Renaissance paintings and 12 classical sculptures, along with a yacht, the Mary, and furniture. Most of the paintings and all the Roman sculptures were from the Reynst collection, the most important seventeenth-century Dutch collection of paintings of the Italian sixteenth century. The collection was given to Charles II to mark his return to power in the English Restoration, before which Charles had spent many years in exile in the Dutch Republic during the rule of the English Commonwealth. It was intended to strengthen diplomatic relations between England and the Republic, but only a few years after the gift the two nations would be at war again in the Second Anglo-Dutch War of 1665–67.

===== Faction De Graeff =====
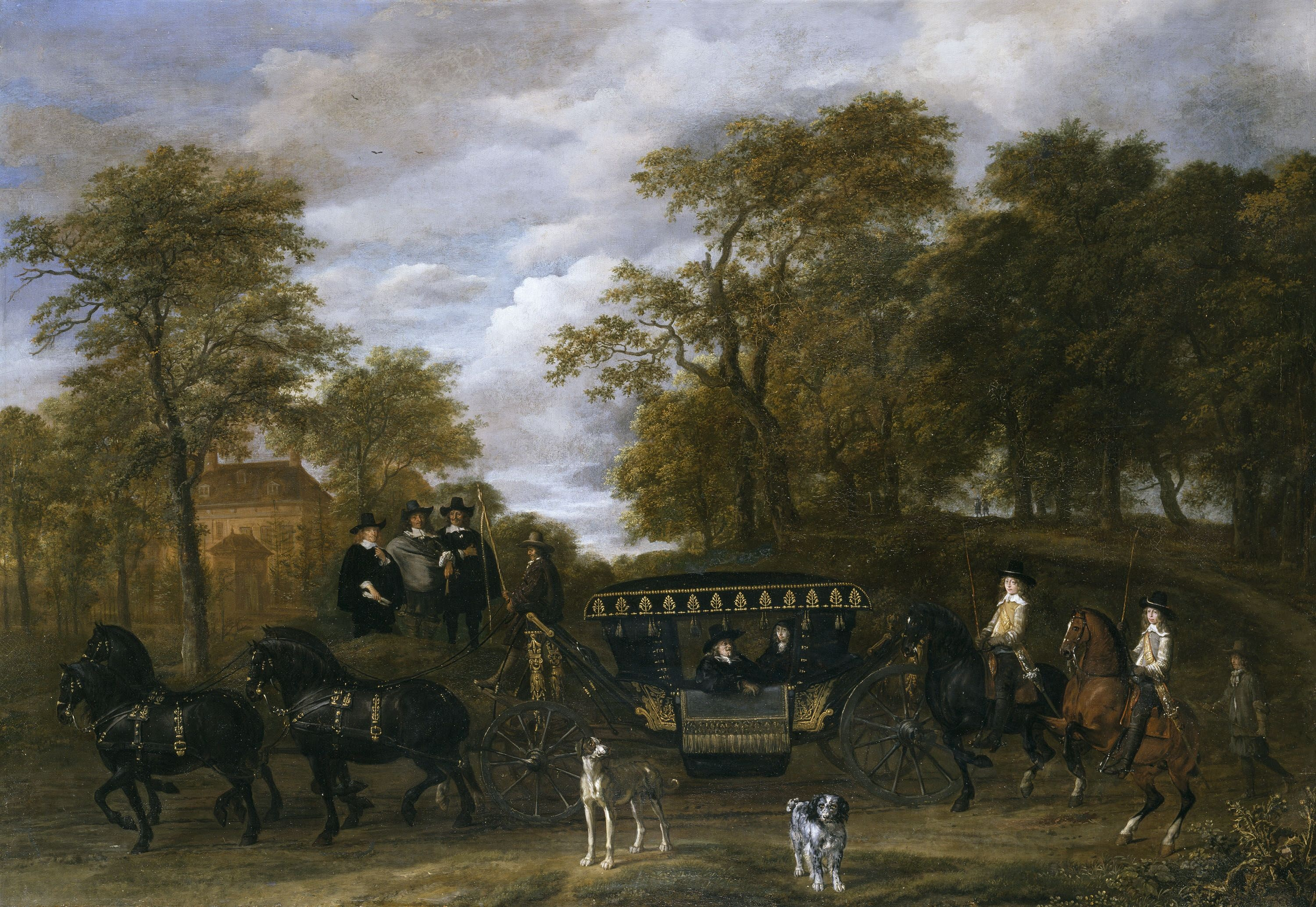
The Arrival of Cornelis de Graeff and Members of His Family at Soestdijk, His Country Estate. Andries de Graeff is the right one of the three figures standing on the roadside to the right of center; painting by Jacob van Ruisdael and Thomas de Keyser, (1656/1660) (National Gallery of Ireland)

From the beginning of the 1660s, two other leading groups emerged in the Amsterdam Vroedschap, in addition to the influential pro-state faction De Graeff; the faction of Gillis Valckenier, who was considered coarse, cunning and scheming and in later years Orange-minded, and the Henrick Hooft faction, which stood as a middle party between the two opposite poles. Between 1661 and 1663 Andries de Graeff acted as a councilor of States of Holland and West Friesland at The Hague. After the death of his brother Cornelis in 1664, he had a dominated force in Amsterdam and chaired the moderate De Graeff faction in the Vroedschap, which included members of the De Graeff and Bicker regent families among others, which were considered moderate. It was now up to Andries de Graeff to take over his brother's role as a balancing and pragmatic manager. This was difficult to achieve in the later 1660s in the incipient power struggle between the Republicans and the Orangists. From now on, Andries de Graeff, together with his nephew Grand pensionary Johan de Witt and Valckenier, directed the development and education of the Prince of Orange and later King of England William III, the child of the State.

In 1666, together with the burgomasters Valckenier, Hendrick Dircksz Spiegel and Gerard Claesz Hasselaer, he presented the French Foreign Minister Hugues de Lionne with a representative painting of Amsterdam by Ludolf Backhuysen. The regents of Amsterdam hoped for the benevolent support of France.

===== The result of the Perpetual Edict (1667) =====
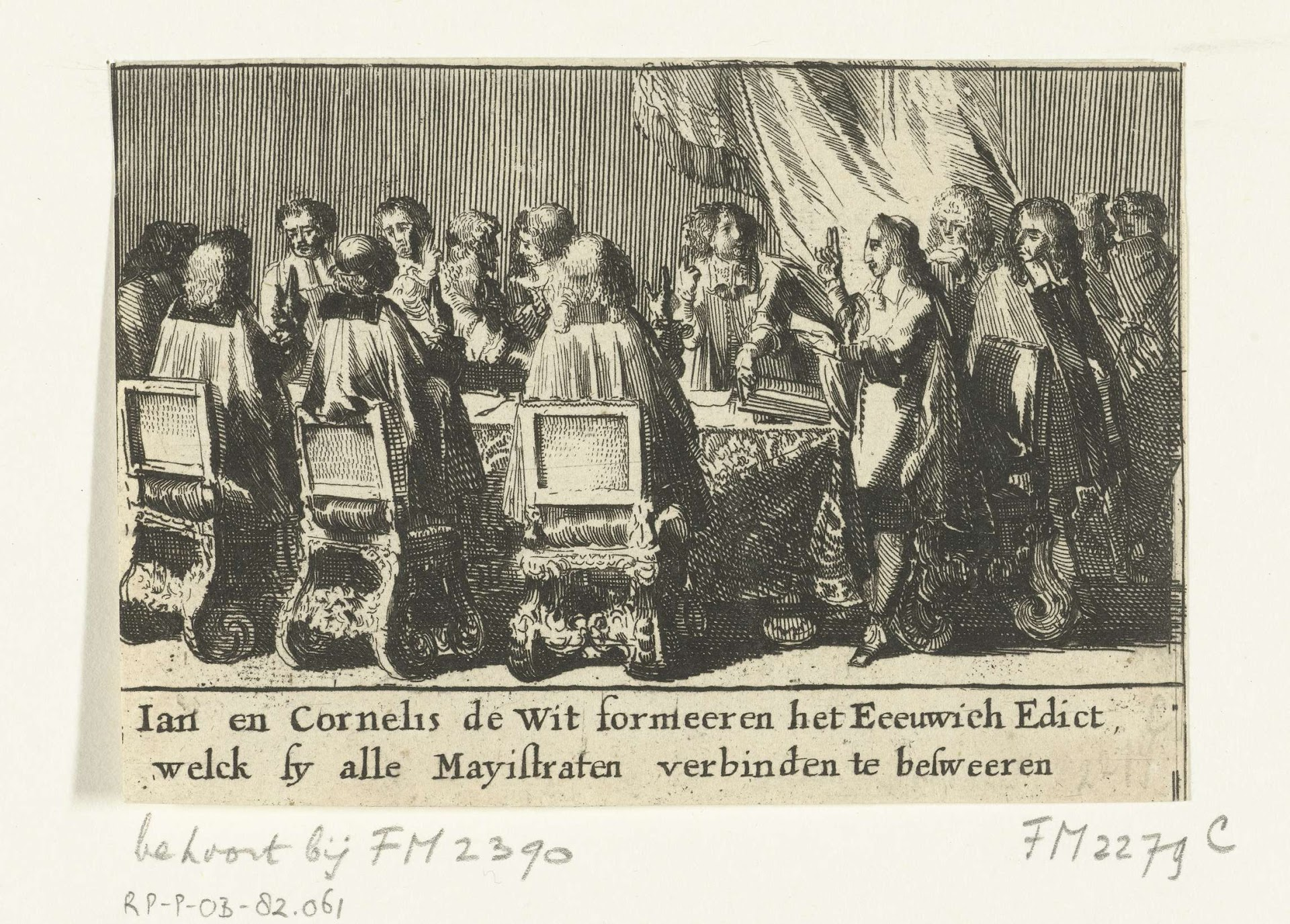
The States of Holland, led by Johan and Cornelis de Witt, adopt the Perpetual Edict in 1667, by Romeyn de Hooghe (1675)

In 1667, Andries de Graeff, along with De Witt and the later-to-be Orangists, Gaspar Fagel and Gillis Valckenier, was an initiator of the Perpetual Edict which abolished the (Oranian) stadtholdership of Holland, declaring it (stadtholdership) to be incompatible with the captain-generalcy of the Republic of the United Netherlands. At approximately the same time a majority of provinces in the States-General of the Netherlands agreed to declare the office of stadtholder (in any of the provinces) incompatible with the office of Captain-general of the Dutch Republic. Despite the Perpetual Edict, De Graeff pursued a moderate policy, for he was extremely good relations with the Orange Court in The Hague.

However, the younger De Graeff did not manage to be as successful as his brother Cornelis in maintaining a pro-states policy. Support for Grand Pensionary Johan de Witt in the Hague was consequently weakened. Cornelis de Graeff had been an excellent comrade-in-arms and adviser to De Witt, a role which the younger De Graeff could not play on an equal footing. As a result, De Witt lost substantial support from Amsterdam for his policies.

In 1669 came the first break with Valckenier, who, opposing the De Graeff faction, and wanting to break their power, prevented de Graeff's appointment as burgomaster in that year. As a result, de Graeff increasingly lost ground in government to Valckenier, who by 1670 was openly on the side of the Prince of Orange; and secret negotiations in Paris with Wiliam III of Orange-Nassau, with the purpose of bringing the Orangists back to power, led to an open break with De Graeff.

Amsterdam City Hall

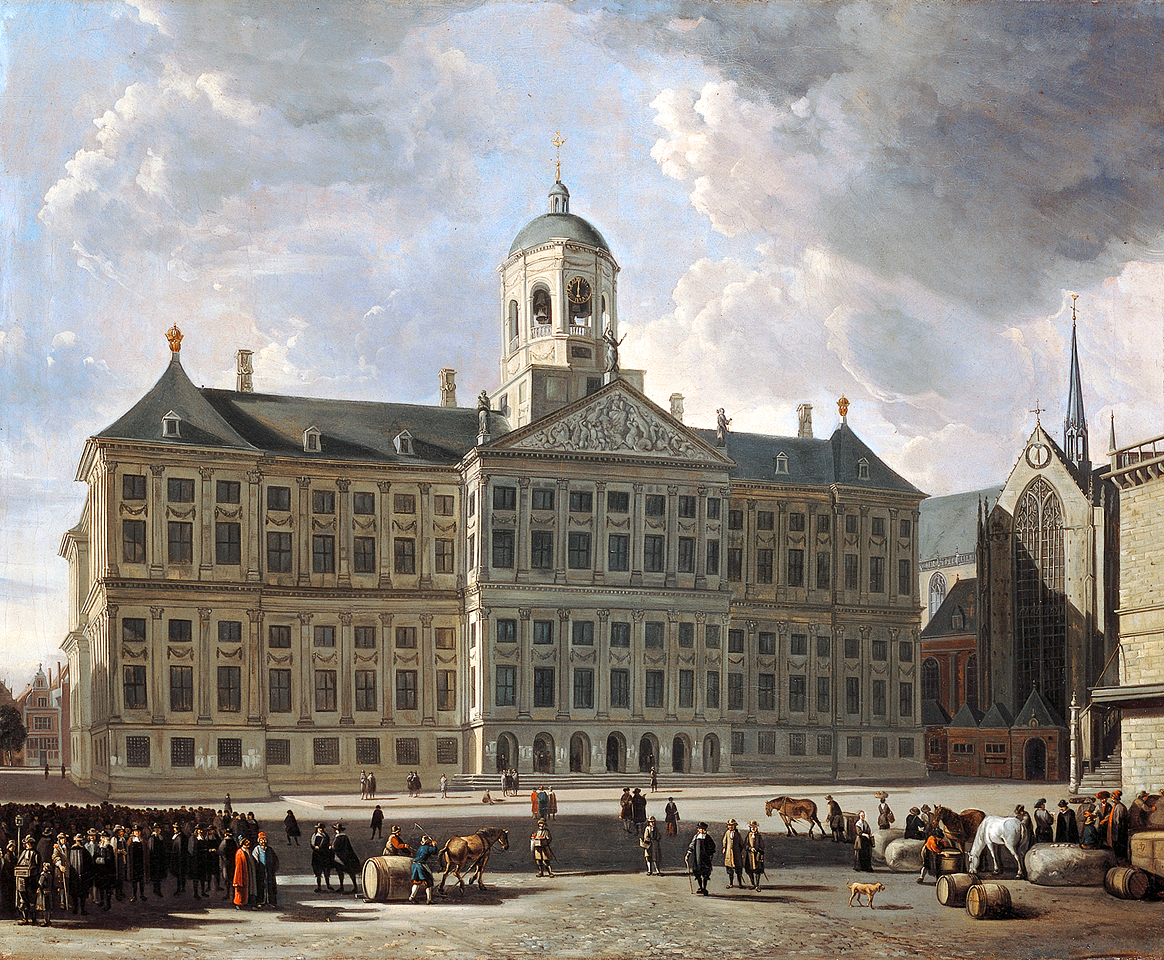
The Amsterdam City Hall on Dam Square, painting by Gerrit Adriaenszoon Berckheyde (1665-1680)

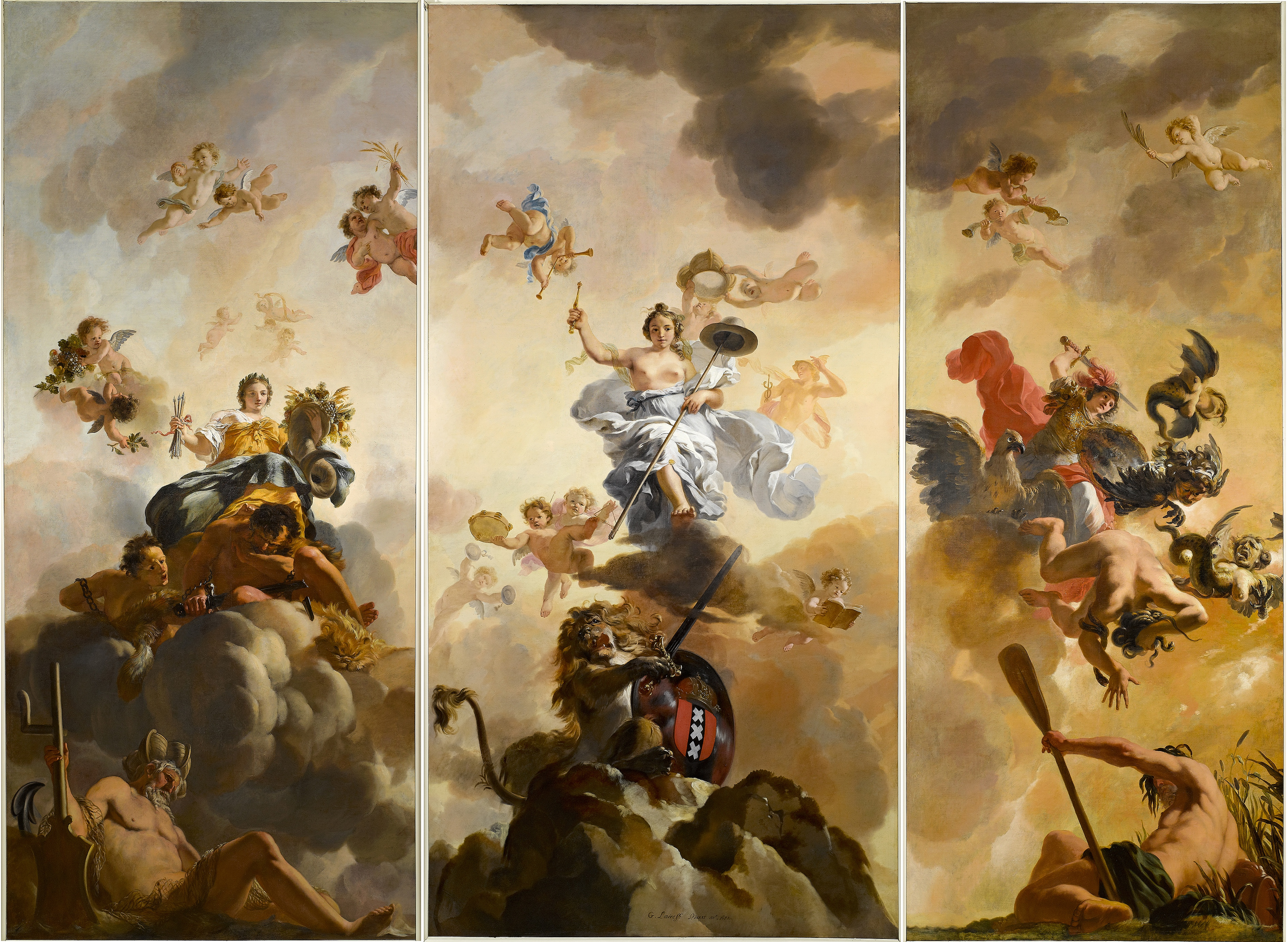
Gerard de Lairesse, "Triomf der Vrede" (Triumph of Peace), three ceiling painting with its parts left to right: Unity, Freedom, Safety (1671/72). The paintings symbolizing the role of Andries de Graeff as protector of the True Freedom of the Dutch Republic (now located at The Hague Peace Palace)

At the early 1670s the Dutch Republic was in a dangerous position and war with France and England seemed imminent. The call for the return of a strong military leader from the Orange-family was gaining momentum, particularly among commoners. A number of Amsterdam regents had started to realise that they needed to seek rapprochement with the Orangists. This put increasing pressure on De Witt's position. In 1670, the Amsterdamse Vroedschap (Amsterdam City Council) led by the burgomasters Valckenier and Coenraad van Beuningen decided to enter into an alliance with the Orangists and to offer William III a seat on the Council of State. This caused a definitive split between De Witt and the Orangist Amsterdam regents grouped around Valckenier.The pro-state party, the De Graeff faction (including, among others, Andries de Graeff, his nephew Pieter de Graeff, and their relatives Lambert Reynst and Cornelis van Vlooswijck) and the Henrick Hooft faction, together succeeded in excluding Valckenier and his comrades from the government of Amsterdam in 1671. Andries de Graeff was once again put forward as burgomaster and managed to gain control with his Republican faction. During the winter of 1671 it seemed as if – at least in Amsterdam – the Republicans were winning. It was an exceptionally opportune moment to commission a monumental three ceiling painting Triomf der Vrede (Triumph of Peace) by Gerard de Lairesse on Amsterdam's independent position for the ‘Sael’ of his burgomaster's hall at the Amsterdam City Hall. De Graeff had a clear message in mind for the ceiling painting: the ‘Ware Vrijheid’ of the Republic was only protected by the republican regents of Amsterdam. The paintings glorify the De Graeff family's role as the protector of the Republican state, defender of ‘True Freedom’. They were also to be understood as a statement of opposition to, and against the return of, the Oranian stadtholdership. However, these paintings wereinstalled not in the town hall, but in his own Huis van der Graeff until 1903, when they were purchased by the Carnegie Stichting for installation in the Peace Palace in The Hague.

===== Rampjaar 1672 =====
When the situation in the republic became more and more precarious in the Rampjaar of 1672 due to the invading French troops, the Orange-leaning party of Valckenier and the statesmen Coenraad van Beuningen, Nicolaes Witsen and Johannes Hudde, who had become Orangists in July of the same year, succeeded in seizing the power of the opposing party To seize the De Graeff faction again and to gain a majority in the Vroedschap (Amsterdam city parliament). In early summer, the population threatened by the French invasion refused to follow Grand pensionary Johan de Witt and thus played themselves into the hands of the Orange Party. Amsterdam did everything it could to avoid surrendering Holland to the French. The States of Holland planned to establish a Holland line for protection. On behalf of Amsterdam, Andries de Graeff pushed ahead with the protective structure and was on duty as fortress commissioner.

Contrary to De Graeff, whose close relationship to Johan de Witt was well known, his rival Valckenier was held in high esteem by the population. A July 1 event epitomizes this exactly, when a number of citizens went to De Graeff's home, denounced him as a coward and threatened that they would raise an army of up to 20,000 men to kill him and any suspects, i.e. supporters of the statesmen to attack De Witt. Valckenier was also asked by a citizen delegation whether he was aware of traitors within the city government, to which Valckenier denied. Since this group had murderous intentions towards De Graeff, Valckenier said that he was not a traitor. The citizens would have "weighed and shrugged their shoulders" and thus spared De Graeff. This event does not fit well with the theory of bitter enemy factions, for Valckenier held his hand protectively over De Graeff, to whom Valckenier later boasted that De Graeff owed his life. In July, due to the immense pressure from the population, the Amsterdam Vroedschap decided to rescind the Perpetual Edict created in 1667 - the abolition of the (Oranian) stadtholdership, which was also initiated five years earlier by De Graeff - and decided that William III of Orange as the new stadtholder of Holland. Also, De Graeff voted for the appointment of Willem III to the Captain general and Admiral-General of Holland. He continued to take on the task of bringing the resolution to The Hague. As he was about to leave, he was stoned by a crowd incited by one of his political opponents, who wanted to assassinate him. His wig was torn off and he was almost stabbed with a sword afterwards. The main reason for this was that De Graeff, like Johan de Witt, was accused of treason and believed that he wanted to hand over the important documents and money for The Hague to the French. De Graeff managed to escape back to the City house op de Dam with the help of the Citizens' Guard. After a speech to the crowd by burgomasters Cornelis de Vlaming van Oudshoorn and Henrick Hooft, De Graeff was able to pass through the Haarlemmerpoort, accompanied by Hooft and De Vlaming van Oudshoorn and the military guard commanded by his brother-in-law, Colonel Cornelis Geelvinck be smuggled out of town. A contemporary report states the following: de Graff, Bürgermeister von Amsterdam / wird von dem gemeinen Pöbel angefallen / wird aus der Stadt convoyiret. (de Graff, mayor of Amsterdam / is attacked by the common mob / is convoyed out of the city.)

Atrocities

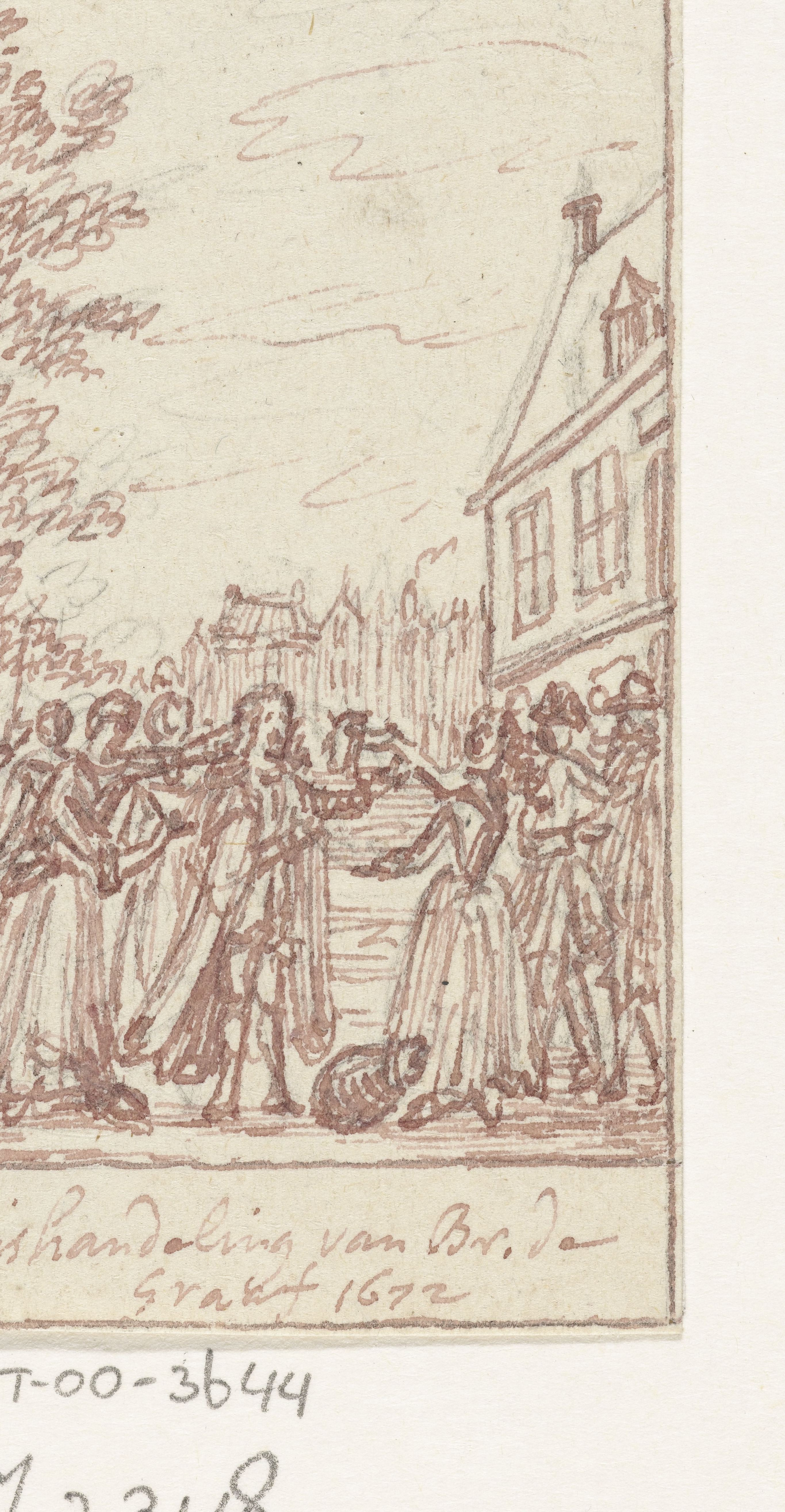
Mistreatment of Andries de Graeff by an incited crowd (graphic by Simon Fokke)

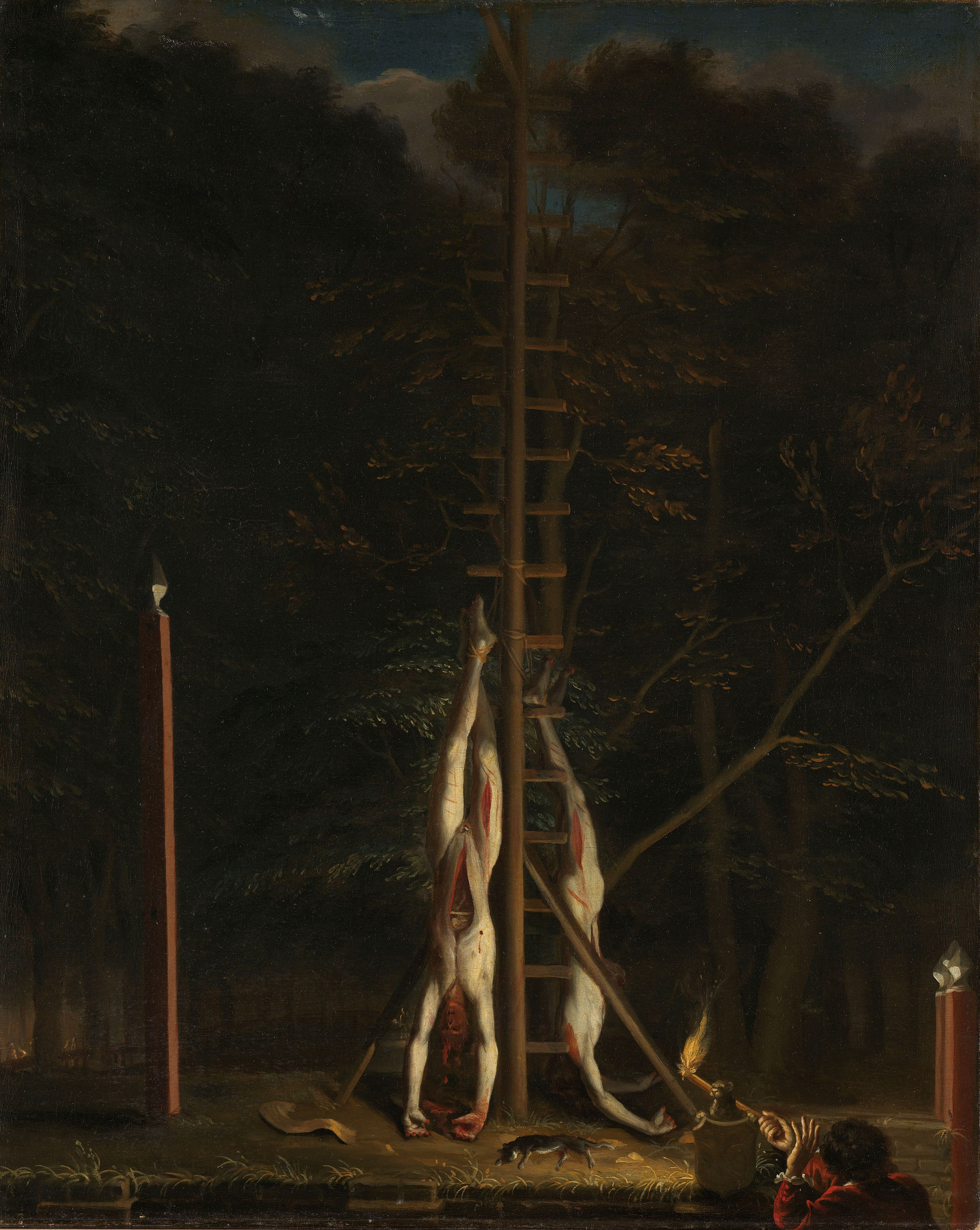
The bodies of the brothers Johan and Cornelis de Witt, The Hague, August 1672. Painting by Jan de Baen, Rijksmuseum (Amsterdam)

On August 12, William III to visited Amsterdam. At the Vroedschap session, he was courted "with great zeal" by Hooft, who also led him to the seat of the president-burgomaster. When the meeting was almost over, De Graeff went straight for the prince with outstretched hand, but it was noticeable that Willem "did not accept him aen sach". The cards seemed to have already been reshuffled, and Hooft had succeeded in gaining the Orangeman's favor against De Graeff.

The brothers Johan and Cornelis de Witt were accused in pamphlets by Oranian partisans of wanting to replace the House of Orange with that of De Witt together with Louis XIV of France. On August 20, the De Witts were brutally murdered in The Hague by a popular mob, incensed by Orange party members and the ongoing pamphlets. After these internal political upheavals, the people stood united behind the Orangers. As in other cities, large crowds demanded that the Amsterdam Vroedschap be purged of the De Witts' confidants and partisans. De Graeff's ally, burgomaster Henrick Hooft, was threatened with stoning if he did not resign. On walls in the city the inscription could be read: Beware citizens, the traitors are active again. They are: Reinst, Vlooswijk, de Graeff, Outshoorn, Hooft, Pol, Bontemantel. On August 30, at the behest of the Oranger, treacherous pro-De Witt city regents were to be identified and forced to resign. In Amsterdam the Vroedschap delayed this result in order to achieve a reconciliation between De Graeff and Hooft with Valckenier. On August 30, at the behest of the Oranger, treacherous pro-De Witt city regents were to be identified and forced to resign. In Amsterdam the Vroedschap in person of Schepen Jan Six delayed this result in order to achieve a reconciliation between De Graeff and Hooft with Valckenier. However, there was no reconciliation between De Graeff and Valckenier, since the Orangeman saw no advantage in it, and Valckenier himself would have no interest in it, since he wasted his popularity with the people and with the Orangeman precisely because of his opposition to De Graeff, the Wittiaanse (Johan de Witt), thanked.

During the Vroedschaps meeting on 3 September, De Graeff offered his support to Amsterdam's new powerful politician, Valckenier, who vehemently refused, swearing at both him and his late Cornelis de Graeff. De Graeff resigned from politics that same day, but was not expelled from the government and from all offices until September 11 (September 10 session). On September 5, the ongoing uproar and popular anger caused the Amsterdam Vroedschap, due to community unrest and to prevent massacres and looting, the new governor to change the law to allow certain regents to be replaced by those more friendly to Stadtholder William III, thus restoring order within the city government. This law allowed the Amsterdam Vroedschap on September 10 to expel Republicans, who were undesirable in the Orange Party, from the government. This affected 16 former burgomasters, Vroedschapen and Schepen of the city, mostly members of the De Graeff parliamentary group, including De Graeff, Hooft, Bontemantel, De Graeff's brother-in-law Lambert Reynst and his two nephews Pieter and Jacob de Graeff, the sons of his late brother Cornelis. It is striking that twelve of these politicians were among those who expelled Valckenier and his faction from the Vroedschap in 1671. This event marked the end of Andries de Graeff's Wittians (Johan de Witt), but by contrast Hooft and his fellow factions were able to remain in the Vroedschap. It was probably the reward for Hooft having served the Orangeman well and owed his subservience to him.

===== Conclusion and outlook =====
In the end, despite his best efforts, Andries de Graeff failed to take over from his late brother Cornelis and thus ensure a stable Amsterdam (Dutch) government and the support of Johan de Witt. This meant the political exit of the De Graeff faction in the government of Amsterdam and its influence on Holland.

The conflicts between Wilhelm III of Orange and the patricians of Amsterdam in the Rampjaar 1672 showed that neither Gillis Valckenier nor Henrick Hooft can be considered convinced Orangists. The decisive factors here were mainly the commercial interests for which Valckenier campaigned and at the same time accused his rival Andries de Graeff of wasteful politics. Likewise, the anti-French policies of Valckenier and Coenraad van Beuningen arose from their belief that trade would benefit them. This makes her conflict with Johan de Witt, the epitome of the "French Connection", and also De Graeff, understandable. It can be assumed that it was not of primary interest to Valckenier whether the Oranger would become stadtholder. When he advocated the continuation of the war with France after 1674, there were arguments with Valckenier because Amsterdam was now benefiting from the peace.

==== Last years and death ====
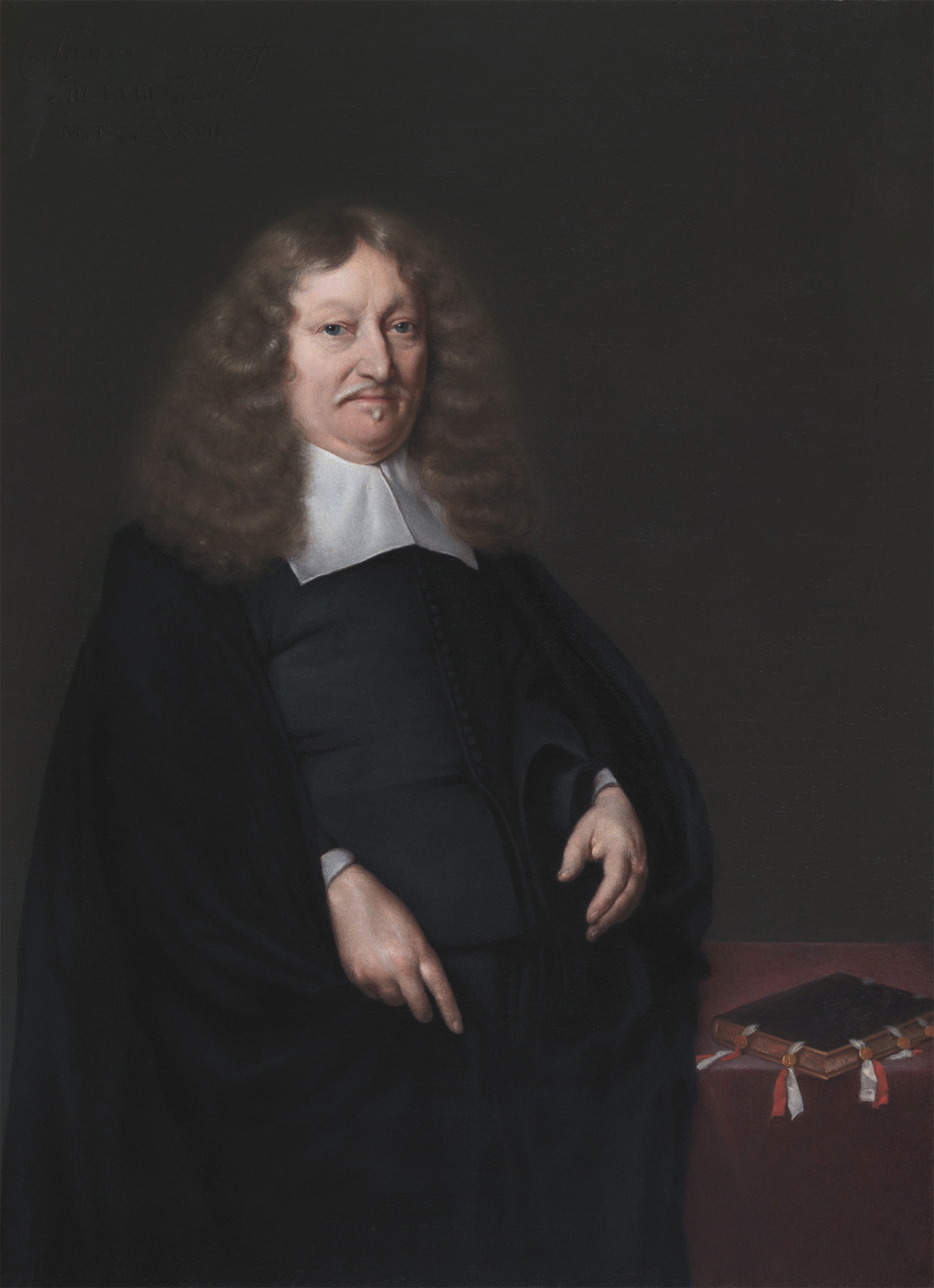
Portrait of Andries de Graeff by Gerard ter Borch, 1673/74. The book with the red and white ribbons indicates the imperial knighthood to be obtained.

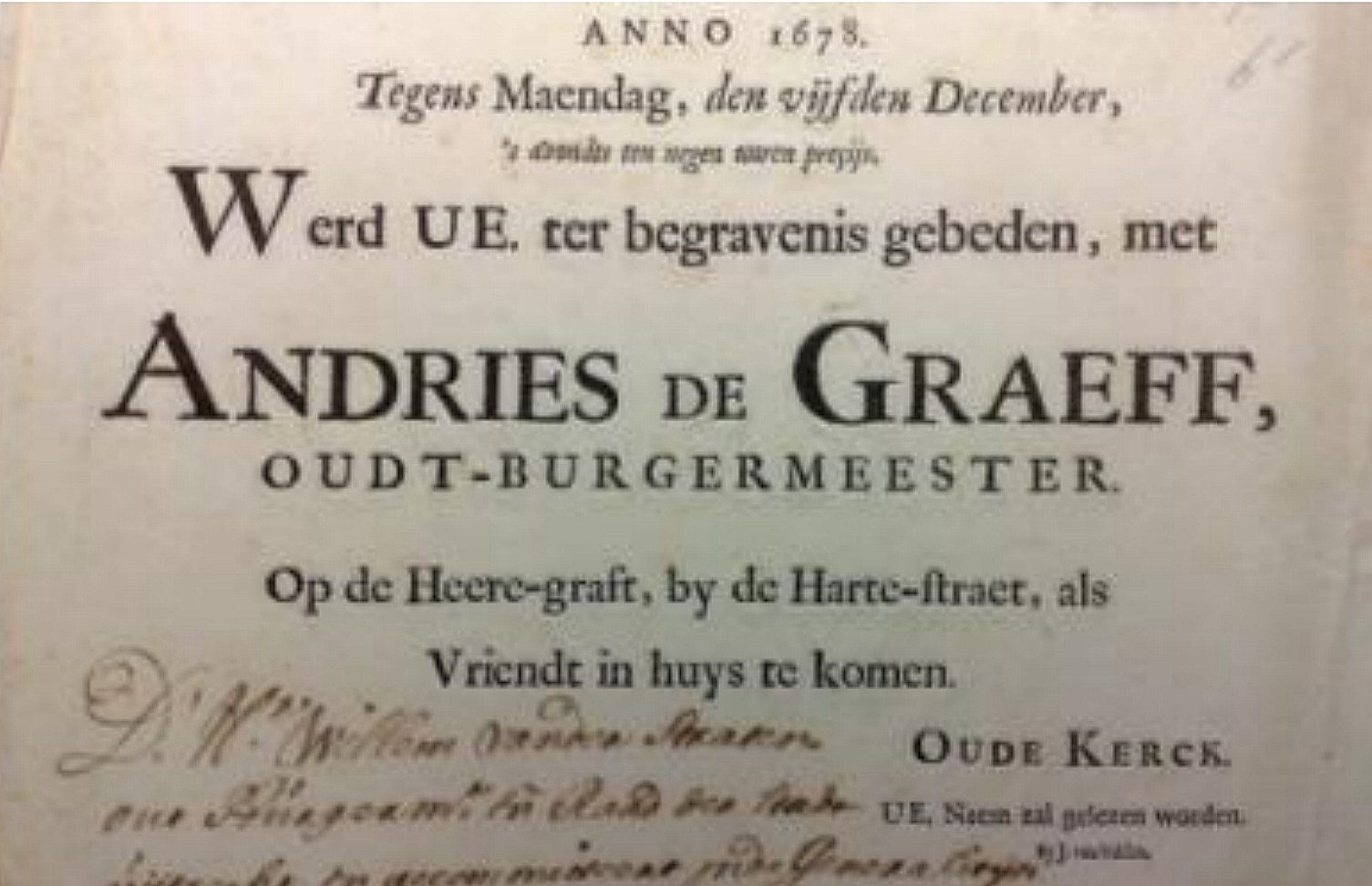
Death report of Andries de Graeff

Andries Graeff initially stayed in Amsterdam. De Graeff was one of the 250 richest people of the Dutch Golden Age and was initially posted a fortune of 292,000 guilders in 1674, but this sum was increased to 700,000 guilders (equivalent to the sum of six million euros in 2009) through the influence of his old adversary Gillis Valckenier 2009), while Valckenier's son Wouter Valckenier, who married a rich heiress, only had to pay tax on the sum of 10,000 guilders himself (which corresponded to the average wealth of a notary or pharmacist). The historian Kees Zandvliet estimates De Graeff's fortune in 1678 at 1,100,000 guilders. In 1676 De Graeff moved to Utrecht, whereupon Valckenier reported him for tax evasion, after which he returned to his native city after only one year.

In 1678, Andries de Graeff died on November 30 and was buried in the family plot in Amsterdam's Oude Kerk. However, since his son Cornelis died young on October 16, half of his inheritance went to his son-in-law Diederik van Veldhuyzen, the husband of his older daughter Alida. In 1681 the husband of his younger daughter Arnoldina, Transisalanus Adolphus Baron van Voorst tot Hagenvoorde van Bergentheim, received estates from the De Graeff family worth 556,000 guilders, organized by Van Veldhuyzen.

== Art and Lifestyle ==
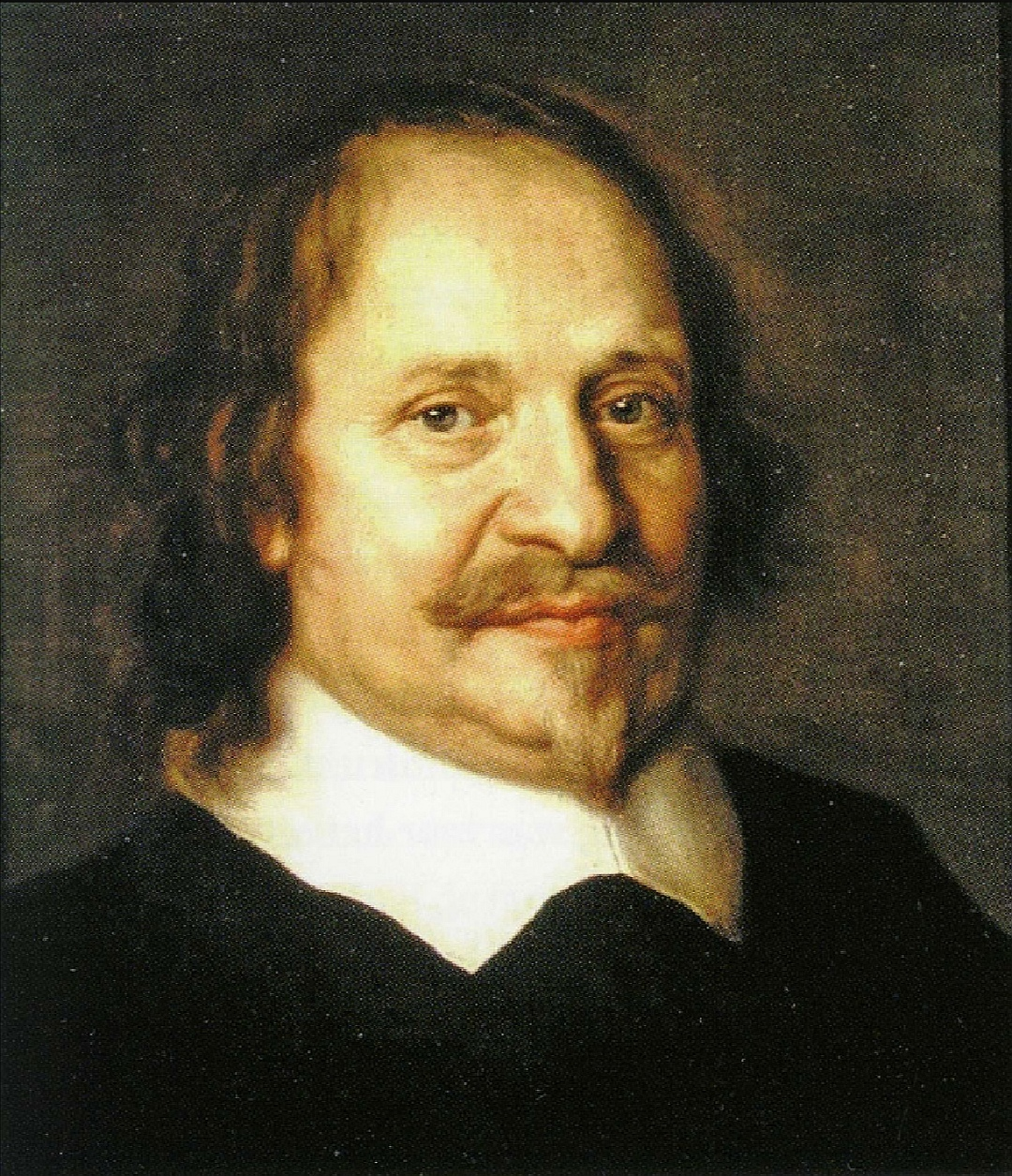
Andries de Graeff, painting by Govert Flinck (c 1650)

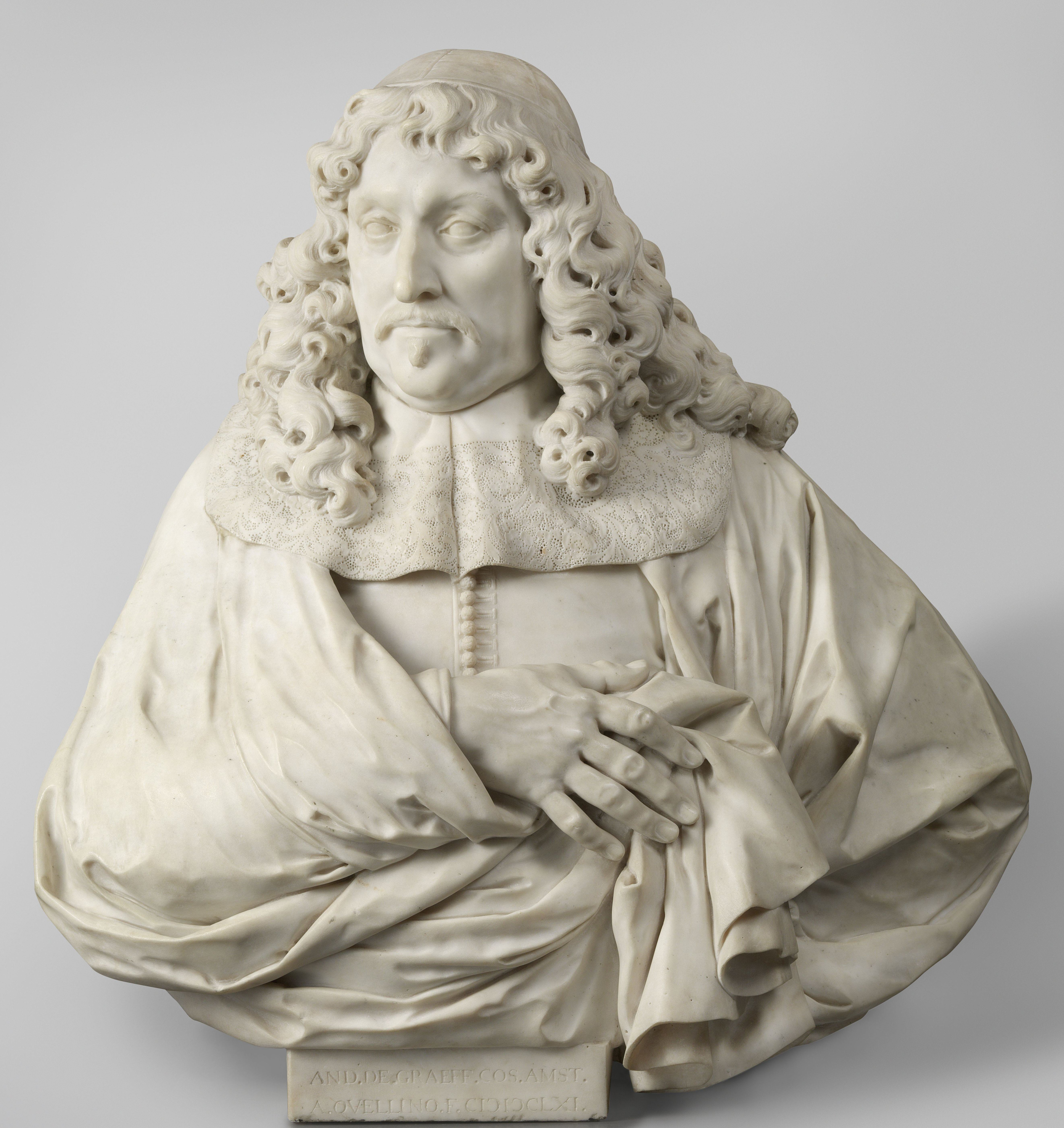
Andries de Graeff, marble bust by Artus Quellinus (1661)

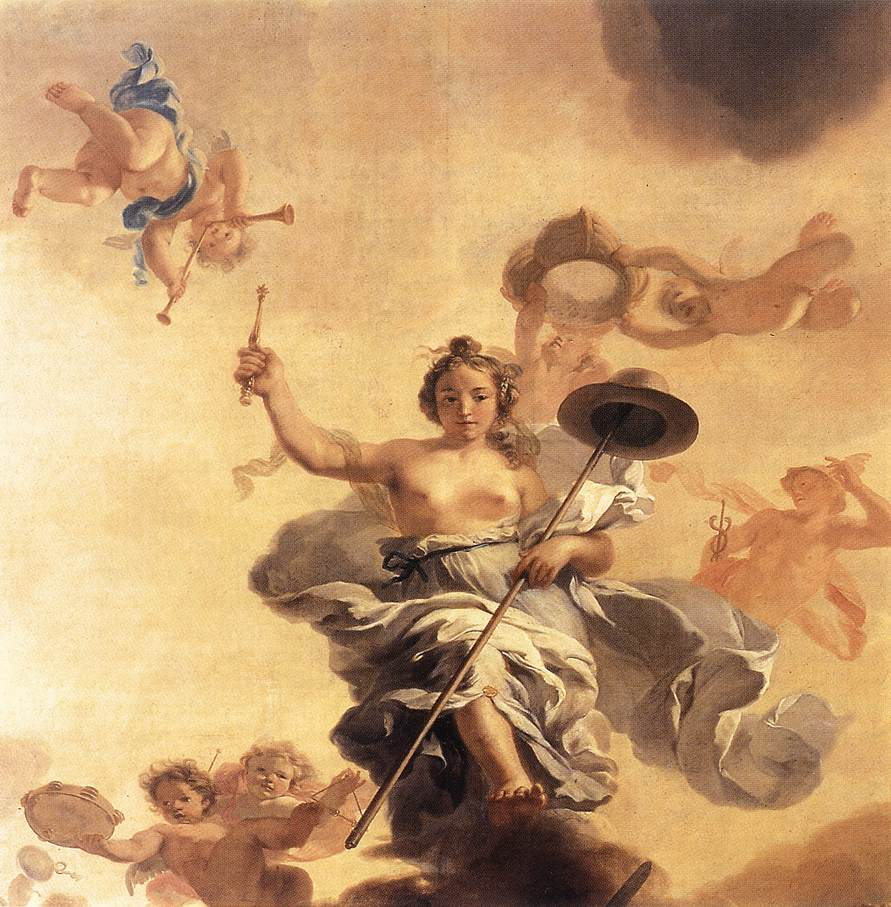
Gerard de Lairesse, Triomf der Vrede; detail (Allegory of the Freedom of Trade) of the ceiling painting symbolizing the role of Andries de Graeff as protector of the True Freedom of the Dutch Republic (1671/72), The Hague Peace Palace

Like his brother Cornelis, Andries de Graeff was one of the greatest patrons of art and culture of his time and surrounded himself with art and beauty. He was painted by various artists of the Dutch Golden Age, Rembrandt van Rijn, Gerard ter Borch, Govert Flinck and Thomas de Keyser. Jan Lievens did a drawing and Arthus Quellinus a bust of him. In addition to his friendships and patronage with Flinck, ter Borch, Lievens, Quellinus and the poets Joost van den Vondel Jan Vos, Caspar Barlaeus, and Gerard Brandt, he was also a patron of Rembrandt at a young age. But this support ended abruptly when Rembrandt received a commission for a portrait from De Graeff, which, according to his family, represented "drunk and unfinished". De Graeff refused to pay him the immensely high sum of 500 guilders for this work. Eventually, Rembrandt sued De Graeff in a lawsuit he won, earning him his claimed payment of over 500 guilders. Since then, however, he has not been given any more commissions by the Amsterdam patrician class and has been ignored when it comes to prestigious public contracts. On the other hand, De Graeff was associated with the poet Van den Vondel as a patron and supporter into old age, and after the bankruptcy in 1656 he got him a job as an accountant at the Bank van Lening with a salary until the end of his life.

In literature, Andries de Graeff is often considered an art lover or patron. His patronage consisted of commissions to artists such as Quellinus, Rembrandt and Ter Borch for the portraits of himself and his family. Also the remarks of the writer and painter Arnold Houbraken, beginning 18th century have contributed to this picture. In one of his works, the British historian Peter Burke compares the elites of Venice and Amsterdam in the 17th century. In it he mentions that Andries de Graeff had paintings of Ceres, Flora, Juno, Venus and the reclining Diana in his cityhouse.

De Graeff liked to show himself in princely garb. The marble bust of Quellinus depicts him as a Roman consul. The burgomasters of Amsterdam were inspired by the ancient Roman Republic and saw themselves as successors to the Roman patricians and Amsterdam as the successor to the Roman Republic. The Rijksmuseum Amsterdam explains more about this bust: This is impressively expressed in this impressive portrait bust by Andries de Graeff. Wearing a cloak resembling a classical toga, he had himself immortalized in marble in the guise of a Roman consul, as indicated by the letters "COS" (the abbreviation for a consul in ancient Rome) after his name on the pedestal.

Around 1660, Andries de Graeff was also painted at The Arrival of Cornelis de Graeff and Members of His Family at Soestdijk, His Country Estate by Thomas de Keyser and Jacob van Ruisdael. The painting Show his brother Cornelis and his wife Catharina Hooft and their sons Pieter and Jacob on horsebacks. Alongside his brothers-in-law Pieter Trip and Willem Schrijver, he is the right of the three figures standing on the roadside to the right of center.

In 1671, Gerard de Lairesse painted the three ceiling painting Triomf der Vrede (Triumph of Peace) for De Graeff. They had a clear message: the ‘Ware Vrijheid’ of the Republic was only protected by the republican regents of Amsterdam. The paintings glorify the De Graeff family's role as the protector of the Republican state, defender of ‘True Freedom’. It is also to be understood as a statement of opposition and against the return to the Oranian stadtholdership. De Graeff's choice of this subject was based on its quality as a signer and co-initiator of the Perpetual Edict and is not surprising. The ominous thing is that these ceiling paintings at Rampjaar were completed in 1672. Here came the True freedom - the era of the First Stadtholderless Period - to an abrupt end, as did burgomaster De Graeff's political career.

In 2007, Austrian artist Matthias Laurenz Gräff, a distant descendant of De Graeff, used Rembrandt's painting of Andries in his painting "Im herbstlichen Wald" (In the autumn forest) and Quellinus' bust in his painting "Morbide Zeiten" (Morbid times) as part of his diploma series.

De Graeff also dealt very intensively with the genealogy of his house and its lineage, about which Van den Vondel wrote a treatise personally dedicated to him. Van den Vondel also decided the poem Op den edelen en gestrengen Heer Andries de Graeff, Ouden Raet en Rekenmeester der Graeflijckheit van Hollant, en West-Vrieslant, nu Out-Burgermeester, en Zeeraedt t'Amsterdam to De Graeff.

Andries de Graeff belonged to the richest persons of the Dutch Golden Age and in 1674 he owned 700,000 guilders which put him at rank 34 of the 250 richest persons.

=== Houses and Estates ===
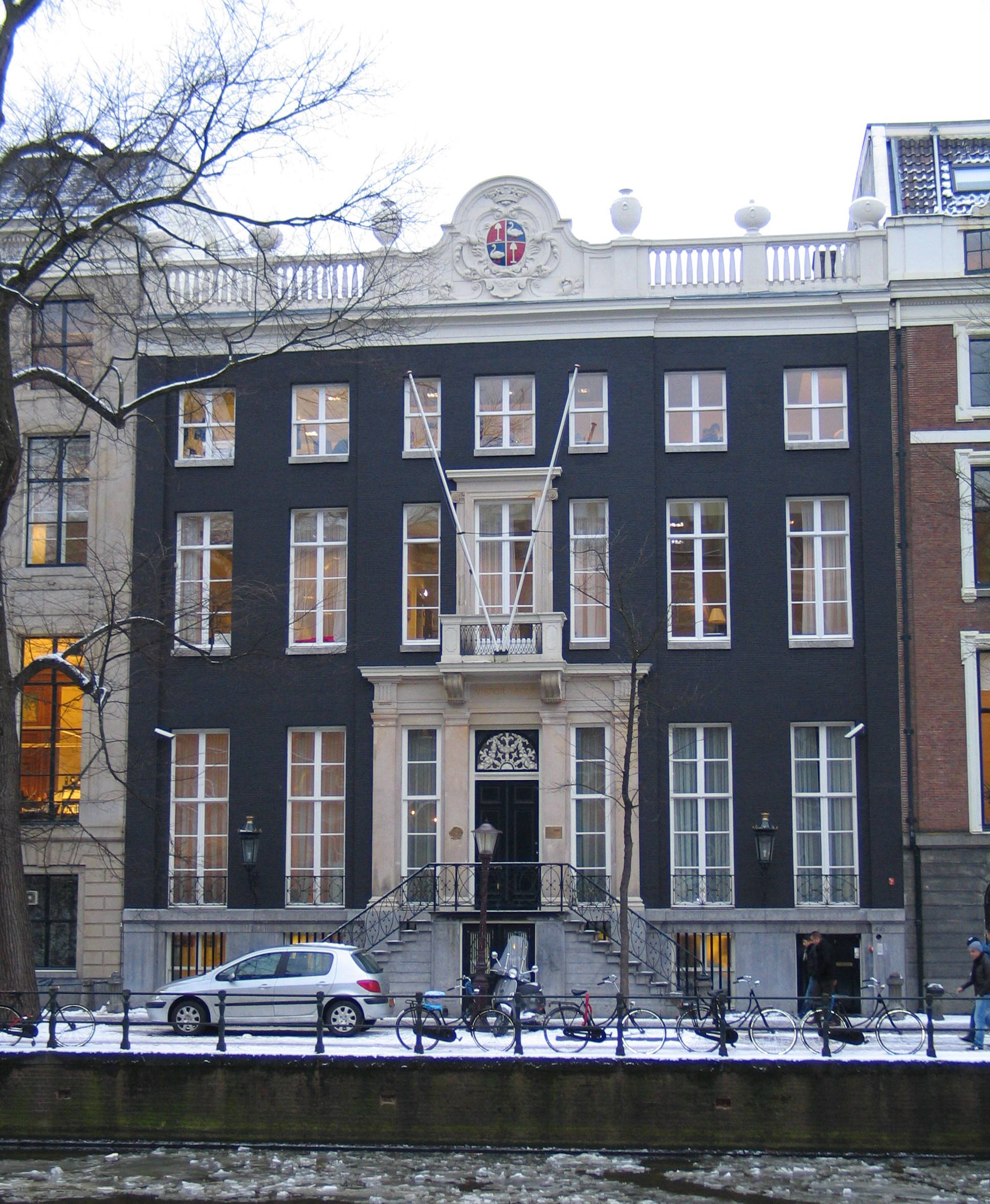
Huis van der Graeff

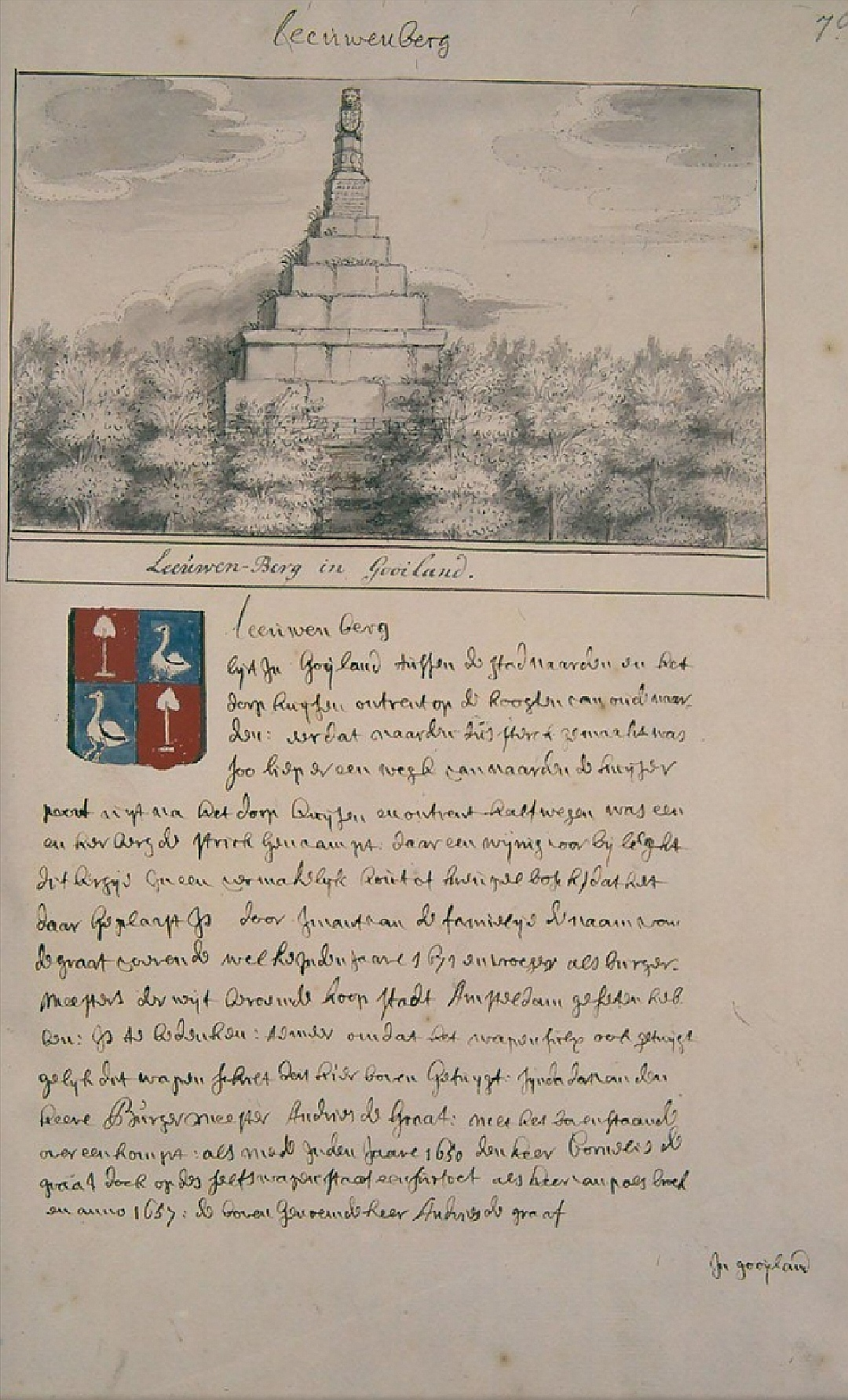
Description of the Leeuwenberg on Graeffenveld with the coat of arms by Andries de Graeff (drawing, probably 19th century)

Andries de Graeff lived in the cityhouse Huis van der Graeff in Amsterdam's Herengracht - in its most magnificent part, the so-called Gouden Bocht (now No. 446) - which is decorated on its top with his coat of arms. It also housed his collection of paintings with paintings by great Dutch masters from the Golden Age. He also owned the three large ceiling frescoes Triomf der Vrede (Triumph of Peace) by Gerard de Lairesse. These paintings were present in the garden room of this house until 1900 and today they are in the Peace Palace in The Hague. In 2008, the two fashion designers Viktor Horsting and Rolf Snoeren from Viktor & Rolf took over the old palace.

De Graeff had country estates with the Vredenhof near Voorschoten and Graeffenveld near Oud-Naarden (Naarden), where he had a hill built, the Venusberg, on the top of which a lion statue was erected, and which was then called Leeuwenberg. Another country estate was added in 1675 when he and his nephews Pieter de Graeff and Gerard Bicker (I) van Swieten bought Valkenburg (the former Valckeveen of his grandfather Dirck Jansz Graeff) near Heemstede for 7,480 guilders from his sister Christina de Graeff (1609 –1679).

=== Art collection ===
Andries de Graeff had an art collection that included masterpieces by Rembrandt, Gerard ter Borch, Govaert Flinck and other Dutch masters of the 16th and 17th centuries. The historian Peter Burke, in his book Venice and Amsterdam: Study of Seventeenth-century Elites, mentions a large collection without giving any references. Probably the most famous painting in De Graeff's collection was Rembrandt van Rijn's Jacob Blessing the Sons of Joseph, which hung above De Graeff's fireplace in his Amsterdam cityhouse on the Herengracht. The painting shows De Graeff's sister Wendela de Graeff, her husband Willem Schrijver and her two sons in as biblical characters. Also in De Graeff's collection were Rembrandt's painting Minerva and Ter Borch's Portrait of Cornelis de Graeff - depicting Andries' son Cornelis. In the mid-18th century, Gerrit de Graeff, a descendant of De Graeff's brother Cornelis, sold various masterpieces, including Jacob Blessing the Sons of Joseph and Rembrandt's full length portrait of De Graeff to a Hamburg art dealer. Landgrave William VIII of Hesse-Kassel bought the paintings from him and furnished his picture gallery, today's Old Masters Picture Gallery, with them.

=== Popular culture ===
In Peter Greenaway's film Nightwatching from 2007, Andries de Graeff is portrayed as a drunken man who has just come out of the brothel. Greenaway shows that De Graeff's portrayal of Rembrandt van Rijn reflects him as a war drunkard. De Graeff had only accepted the portrait on the condition that Rembrandt would add an extra detail to the painting afterwards: a gauntlet placed at De Graeff's feet; with this gesture one challenged the opponent to a duel.

== Historiography ==
The Dutch art historian and archivist Bas Dudok van Heel about the impact of the Bicker [in particularly the brothers Andries and Cornelis Bicker] and the linked De Graeff family [in particularly the brothers Cornelis and Andries de Graeff] and their missed (high) noble rank: In Florence families like Bicker and De Graeff would have been uncrowned princes. Here, in 1815, they should at least have been raised to the rank of count, but the southern Dutch nobility would not have put up with that. What you got here remained nothing half and nothing whole.

== Literature ==
- Israel, Jonathan I. (1995) The Dutch Republic - Its Rise, Greatness, and Fall - 1477-1806, Clarendon Press, Oxford, ISBN 978-0-19-820734-4
- Zandvliet, Kees (2006) De 250 rijksten van de Gouden Eeuw: kapitaal, macht, familie en levensstijl blz. 93 t/m 94, uitg. Nieuw Amsterdam, Amsterdam, ISBN 90-8689-006-7
- Dudok van Heel, S.A.C.(1995) Op zoek naar Romulus & Remus. Een zeventiende-eeuws onderzoek naar de oudste magistraten van Amsterdam. Jaarboek Amstelodamum, p. 43-70.
- Burke, P. (1994) Venice and Amsterdam. A study of seventeenth-century élites.
- Graeff, P. de (P. de Graeff Gerritsz en Dirk de Graeff van Polsbroek) Genealogie van de familie De Graeff van Polsbroek, Amsterdam 1882.
- Bruijn, J. H. de Genealogie van het geslacht De Graeff van Polsbroek 1529/1827, met bijlagen. De Bilt 1962–63.

Andries de Graeff House De Graeff Born: 19 OFebruary 1611 Died: 30 November 1678
Preceded by Jonkheers Van de Werve	Lord of the manor of Urk and Emmeloord; 1660–1672	Succeeded by City of Amsterdam
