= Gillis Valckenier =

Burgomaster of Amsterdam

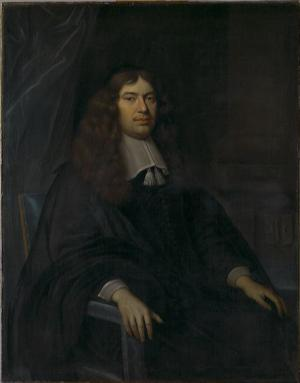
- Gillis Valckenier (1671) by Wallerant Vaillant

Regent and Mayor of Amsterdam
- In office 1665–1679
- Preceded by: Andries de Graeff
- Succeeded by: Johannes Hudde

Personal details
- Born: 1623 Amsterdam
- Died: 1680 (aged 56–57) Amsterdam
- Party: Prince of Orange faction
- Occupation: Regent / Mayor

Gillis Valckenier (1623–1680) was a Dutch politician who was Regent and Mayor of Amsterdam from 1665 to 1679. From 1670, he was an Orangist.

== Life ==
Valckenier was the only son of Wouter Valckenier, burgomaster (mayor) of Amsterdam. His grandfather Gillis Jansz was related to Adriaen Pauw, joined the board of the Admiralty of Amsterdam, and was captain in the civic guard. Gillis studied law at the University of Leiden. In 1649 he was appointed as schepen, in 1652 as member of the vroedschap and in 1657 as administrator of the Dutch East India Company. From 1666 onwards he was involved in the education of William III of Orange, just like Johan de Witt and Cornelis de Graeff before. In the year after he signed the Perpetual Edict (1667), the law was passed and promulgated. Its three chief points were abolition of the stadholderate, permanent separation of the captaincy-general from the stadholderate of all provinces, and the transfer of the political functions of the Stadholder of Holland to the provincial States. In 1670 he became an Orangist and supported the cancellation of the Perpetual Edict in July 1672.

After the political struggle of the republican families De Witt and De Graeff in the rampjaar 1672, Nicolaes Witsen and Johannes Hudde became his opponents in the vroedschap. He had insulted Dirck Tulp and Lambert Reynst; in total sixteen members of the city council lost their seats, jobs on his advice, including the republican faction De Graeff of Andries, Jacob and Pieter de Graeff and their cousin burgomaster Lambert Reynst. When Coenraad van Beuningen was sent to England as a diplomat, and Henrick Hooft died, Valckenier was more powerful than ever. William Temple wrote in Observations upon the United Provinces: "The Turkish sultan was not as powerful in his country, than Valckenier in Amsterdam, (dressing and behaving like a shopkeeper)."

In 1648 Valckenier married Jacoba Rans (1622–1676); the couple had at least seven children. They lived at Jodenbreestraat and were buried in the Zuiderkerk. Their son Wouter married a daughter of Louis Trip. Clara Valckenier married Joseph Coymans (1656–1720). Their grandson, Adriaan Valckenier, became in 1737 a Governor-General of the Dutch East Indies.

== Gallery ==
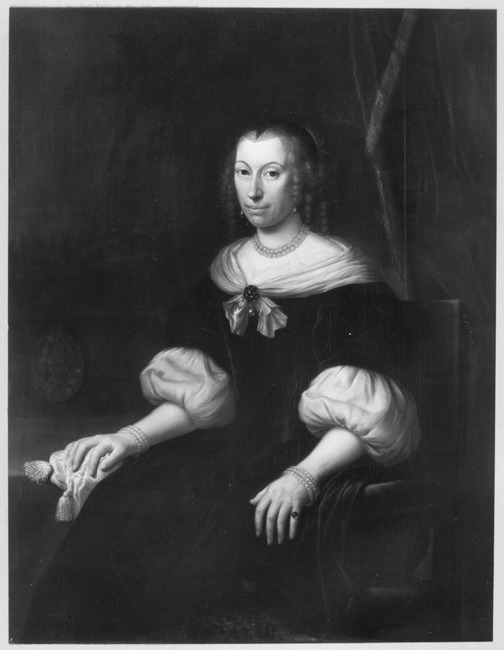
Jacoba Pietersdr Ranst (1671) by Wallerant Vaillant
