= Bicker family =

Dutch patrician family

Bicker Bicker van Swieten
- noble and patrician family
- Parent house: Helmer (paternal) / Van den Anxter (maternal)
- Country: Netherlands
- Founded: 16th century
- Founder: Dirk Helmer (named 1383/90)
- Titles: jonkheer, ridder
- Styles: heer van Swieten, Engelenburg
- Cadet branches: Bicker van Swieten, Bicker Caarten

Bicker (also: Bicker van Swieten) is a Dutch patrician family, it has been a patrician family since 1390. The family has played an important role during the Dutch Golden Age. They led the Dutch States Party and were at the centre of the oligarchy of Amsterdam from the beginning of the 17th century until the early 1650s, they had influence in the government of Holland and the Republic of the United Netherlands. Their wealth was based on commercial transactions. In their political commitment they mostly opposed the House of Orange.

The family, also known as the "Bickerse league", was one of the leading republican forces striving to end the Eighty Years' War between the United Netherlands and the Kingdom of Spain. This took place in 1648 with the Peace of Münster. In 1650, at the height of their power, the leading protagonists Andries and Cornelis Bicker were briefly expelled from the Amsterdam city government due to internal political problems. After that, the Bicker family could no longer achieve such socio-political influence. Since 1815 the family belongs to the new Dutch nobility with the honorific of jonkheer or jonkvrouw.

== History ==
=== Early times ===
Ancestors

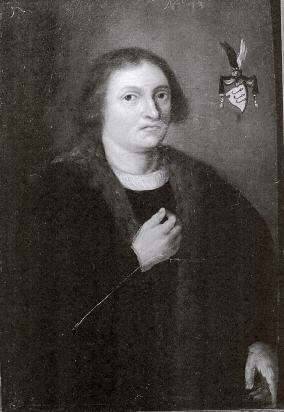
Dirk Jansz Helmer († 1468) acted as the direct ancestor of the 2nd line, the later female line of the Bicker family

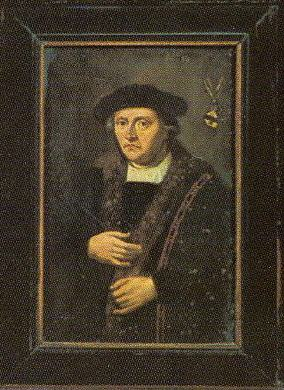
Pieter Meeus Doosz Bicker (1430–1476), father of Machteld Pietersdr Bicker (1455–1526) acting as male progenitor of the upfollowing Bicker family

The Bicker family is the oldest Amsterdam patrician family still in existence today. Their lineage begins with Dirk Helmer, who was recorded in Amsterdam in 1383 and 1390. His son Jan Dirksz Helmer was burgomaster (mayor) in 1433 and schepen (alderman) of the city and was married to Lijsbeth Eggert († around 1468) from the family of stadtholder Willem Eggert. Their son Dirk Jansz Helmer († 1468), priest and milliner, married with Geertruid Gerritsdr van den Anxter. The couple had Gerrit Dirksz Helmer (around 1450–1521/26), who took his maternal name Van den Anxter and was married to Machteld Pietersdr Bicker (around 1455–1516), daughter of Pieter Meeus Doosz Bicker (1430–1476) and Aeltgen Eggert († around 1455; herself a sister of Lijsbeth Eggert). Their son Pieter Gerritsz van den Anxter, named Bicker (1497–1567), Schepen of Amsterdam in 1534, took the maternal family name Bicker and thus acted as the male progenitor of the upfollowing Bicker family. He was a cousin of Boel Jacobszn Bicker († 1505), Burgomaster in 1495 and 1497. Both the Helmer-Bicker and Bicker families belonged to the urban elite as early as the 15th century.

=== Dutch Golden Age ===
During the Dutch Golden Age, the Bicker family was very critical against the influence of the House of Orange. They belonged to the republican political movement of the regenten, also referred to as the 'state oriented', as opposed to the royalists. The Bickers were the most powerful family in Amsterdam and decisively determined the fortunes of the city. They were a major trading family involved in the pelt trade with Muscovy and supplying ships and silver to Spain. The Bicker-De Graeff family-faction became the strongest competitor in the years after the Dutch uprising. Through their work on the Amsterdam City Council and the Dutch East India Company, the Bickers gained enormous influence on politico-economic self-determination in the young Dutch Republic due to the city's position of economic power within the Republic.

Gerrit Bicker (1554–1604), great-grandchildren of the familyfounder Pieter Meeuws Soossensz (Doossensz) Bicker (1430–1476), was a wealthy patrician, politician, international grain merchant and beer brewer. and threw his work in the Amsterdam Vroedschap and as one of the founders of the East India Company, he was able to launch the careers of his sons, grandchildren and nephews. He had four sons, the oldest Andries Bicker ruled the city administration for a long time and was mainly supported and carried by his three brothers Jacob, Jan and Cornelis Bicker, his uncle Jacob Dircksz de Graeff and his cousin Cornelis de Graeff. The Bicker brothers had a firm grip on world trade, trading on the East, the West, the North and the Mediterranean. Andries' uncle Laurens Bicker was one of the first to trade on Guinea and seized four Portuguese ships in 1604. This also gave new impetus to the republican States Party, which had been weakened since the assassination of Land's Advocate Johan van Oldenbarnevelt, and was able to determine Amsterdam politics for a long period of time.

==== Bickerse league ====
leaders of the Bickerse league

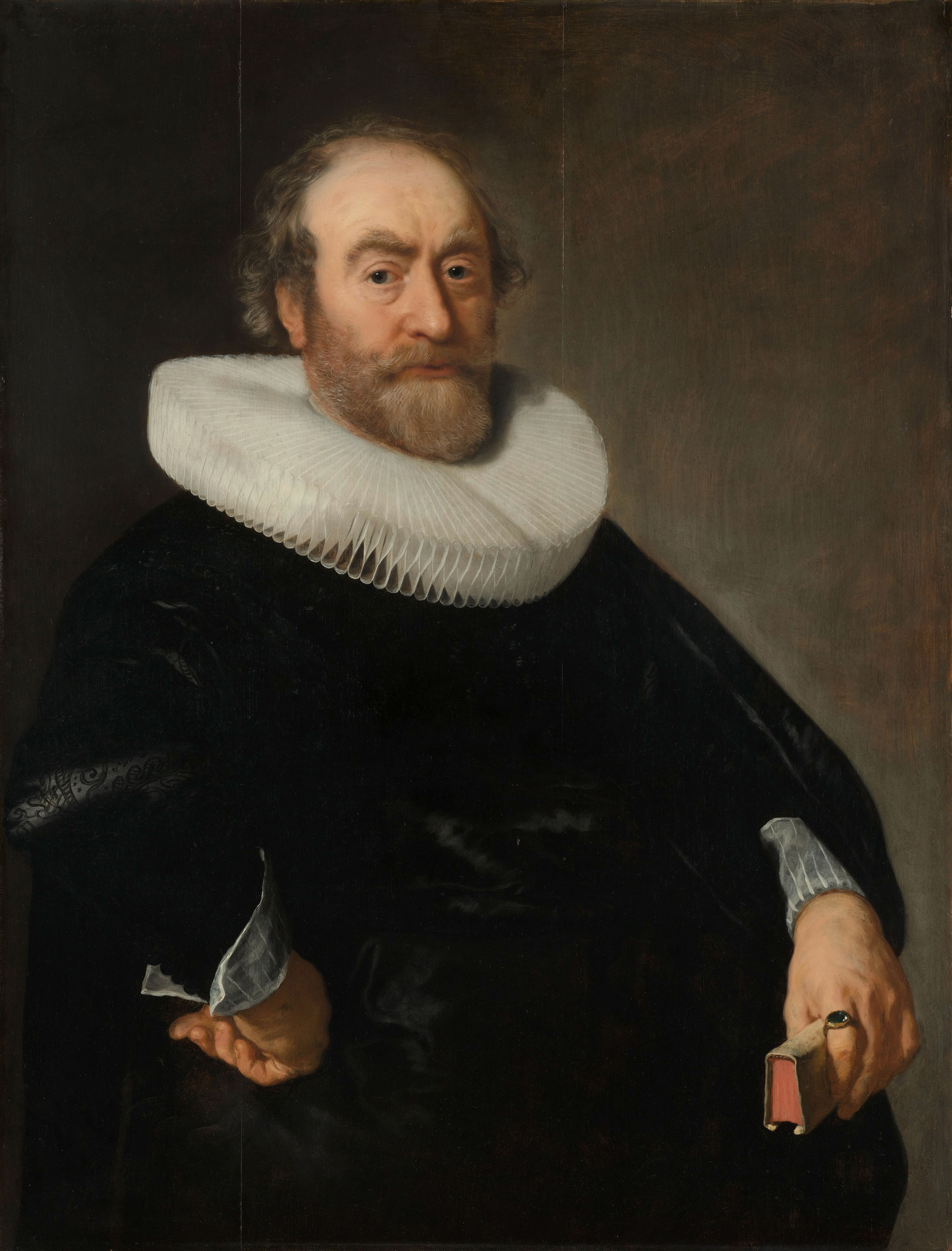
Andries Bicker (1586–1652), Heer van Engelenburg, painted by Bartholomeus van der Helst (1642), Rijksmuseum Amsterdam

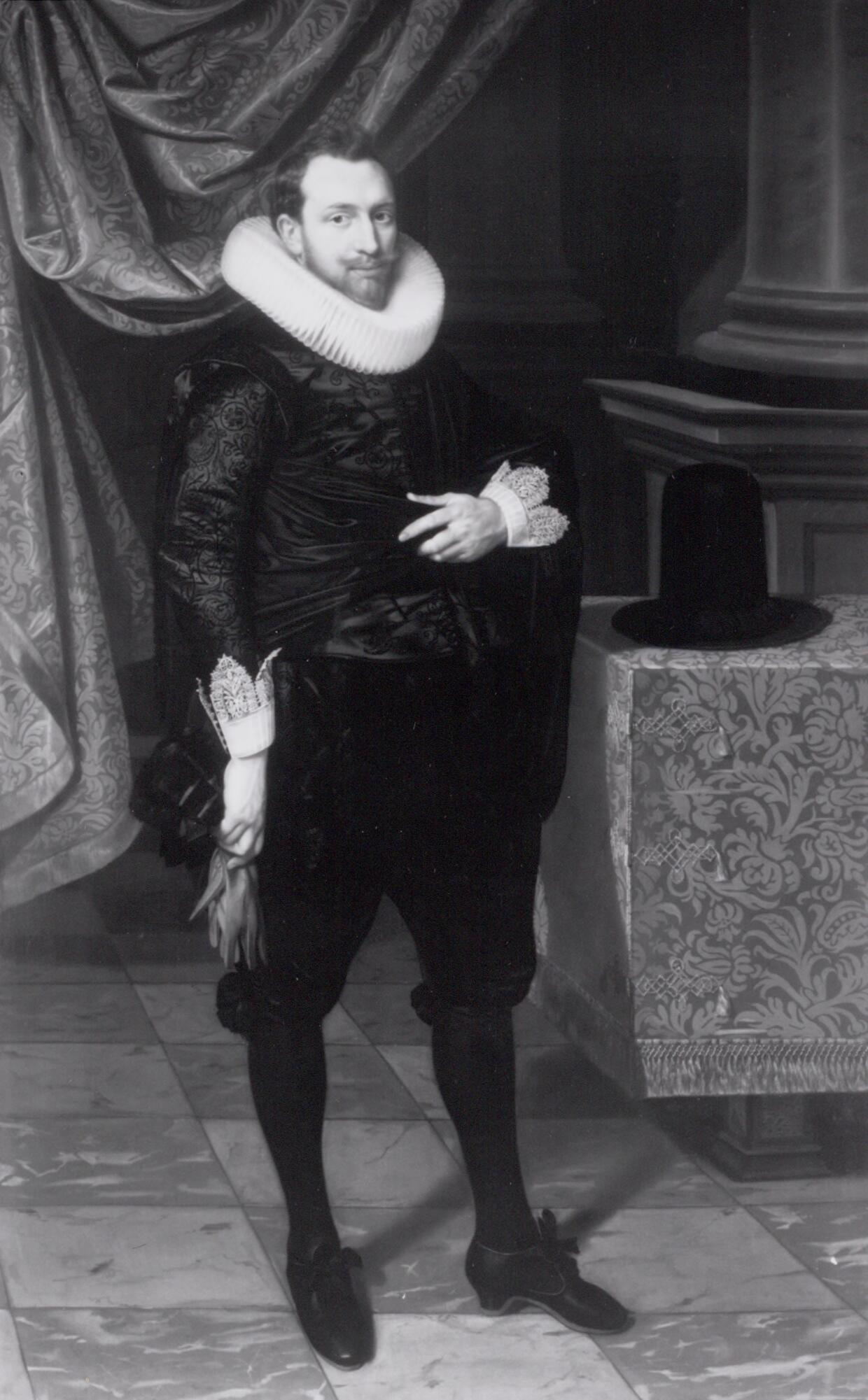
Cornelis Bicker van Swieten (1592–1654), Heer van Swieten, painted by Cornelis van der Voort in 1618

In 1622 the participants opposed the VOC's business operations. The profit that Geurt van Beuningen, Cornelis and Jacob Bicker, Elias Trip and others had made by buying up the entire stock that was in transit, went too far for some. The shareholders accused the directors in a pamphlet of mismanagement, personal enrichment, conflicts of interest and a lack of openness in the VOC's financial situation. When the patent was renewed in 1623, the power of the directors was somewhat limited.

Together with politicians like the republican-minded brothers Cornelis and Andries de Graeff, former Grand pensionary Adriaan Pauw and Jacob de Witt, the Bickers, also called the Bickerse league, strived for the abolition of stadtholdership. They desired the full sovereignty of the individual regions in a form in which the Republic of the United Seven Netherlands was not ruled by a single person. Instead of a sovereign (or stadtholder) the political and military power was lodged with the States General and with the regents of the cities in Holland. At the time of the politically weak Grand Pensionaries Anthonie Duyck and Jacob Cats from the 1620s to the 1640s, Andries Bicker was regarded as the head of the republican regents in Holland and as a politician who resolutely opposed the striving for power of the stadtholders Frederick Henry and William II of Orange. He was considered one of the greatest political opponents of the Frederik Henry. During the two decades from the later 1620s to the early 1650s the Bicker family had a leading role in the Amsterdam administration.

In 1646, seven members of the Bicker family simultaneously held some political position or other. Members of the league where Andries, Jacob, Jan and Cornelis Bicker, and their cousins, the brothers Roelof (1611–1656), Jacob (1612–1676), Hendrick Bicker (1615–1651). The Bickers provided ships to France and silver from Spain, and were interested in ending the Eighty Years War. This brought them in conflict with the stadtholder, some provinces, like Zeeland and Utrecht, and the Reformed preachers. After the Peace of Münster was signed, the Bickers were of the opinion that it was no longer necessary to maintain a standing army, bringing them into vehement conflict with prince Willem II. To regain power William went on the march towards Dordrecht and Amsterdam with an army. His troops, led by Cornelis van Aerssen, got lost in a dense fog and were discovered by the postal courier from Hamburg.

In 1649 Gerard Andriesz. Bicker became High Bailiff of Muiden and Gooiland. In July 1650, before the Attack on Amsterdam (1650), a postman ran into the forces, and warned Gerard Bicker, who immediately left by boat for Amsterdam to inform his uncle, burgemeester Cornelis Bicker and his father. Andries Bicker rallied the civic guard, hired 2,000 mercenaries, had the bridges lifted, the gates closed and the artillery positioned.

After that, the leader of the family and the Bickerse league, Andries Bicker, was purged from the vroedschap, as was his brother Cornelis Bicker, as one of the conditions of the treaty that followed, led by Cornelis de Graeff and Joan Huydecoper van Maarsseveen. Henceforth, it was the equally republican-minded brothers Cornelis and Andries de Graeff and their following who dominated Amsterdam. In 1656, his niece Wendela Bicker married Grand pensionary Johan de Witt. In April Gerard married Alida Conincx, against the will of his late father. In 1660 she was buried in the Nieuwe Kerk, Amsterdam.

The Dutch historian and archivist Bas Dudok van Heel about the inppact of the Bicker and the linked De Graeff family and their missed (high) noble rank: In Florence families like Bicker and De Graeff would have been uncrowned princes. Here, in 1815, they should at least have been raised to the rank of count, but the southern Dutch nobility would not have put up with that. What you got here remained nothing half and nothing whole.

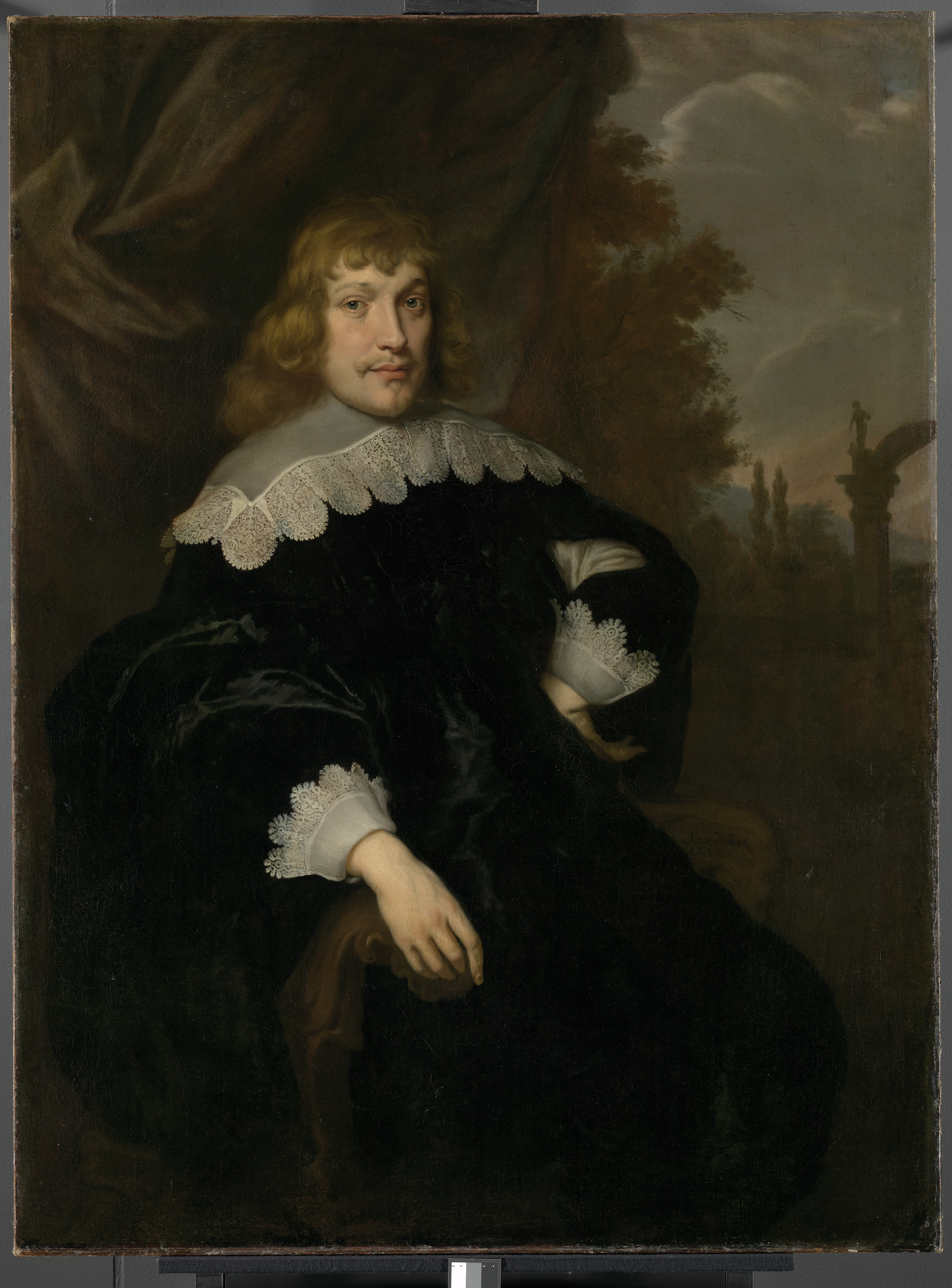
Hendrick Bicker (1615–1651)

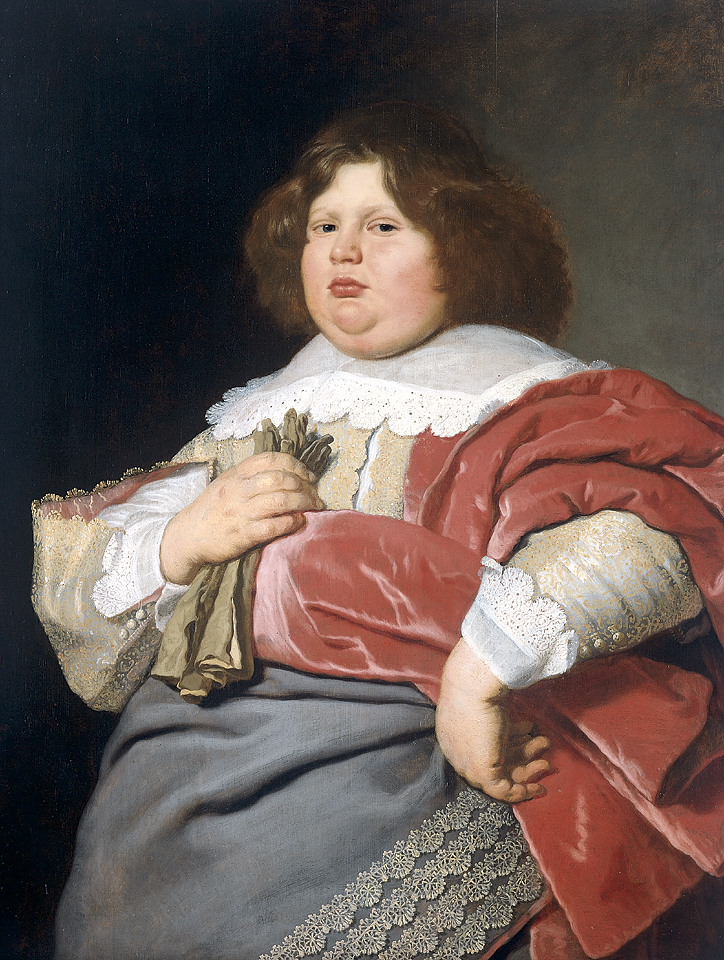
Gerard Bicker (1622–1666), Drost of Muiden, painted by Bartholomeus van der Helst, Rijksmuseum Amsterdam

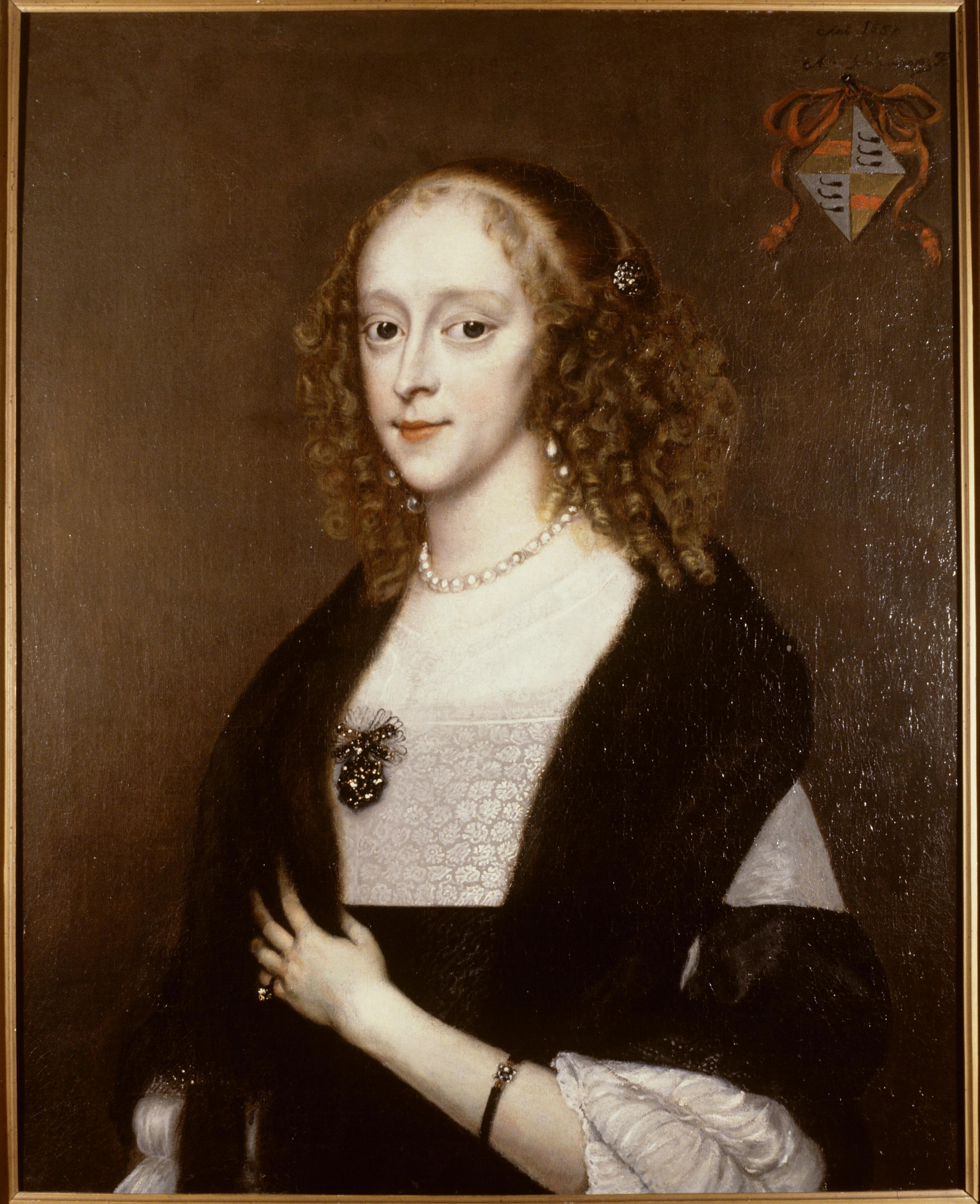
Wendela Bicker (1635–1668), wife of Johan de Witt, painted by Adriaen Hanneman in 1659

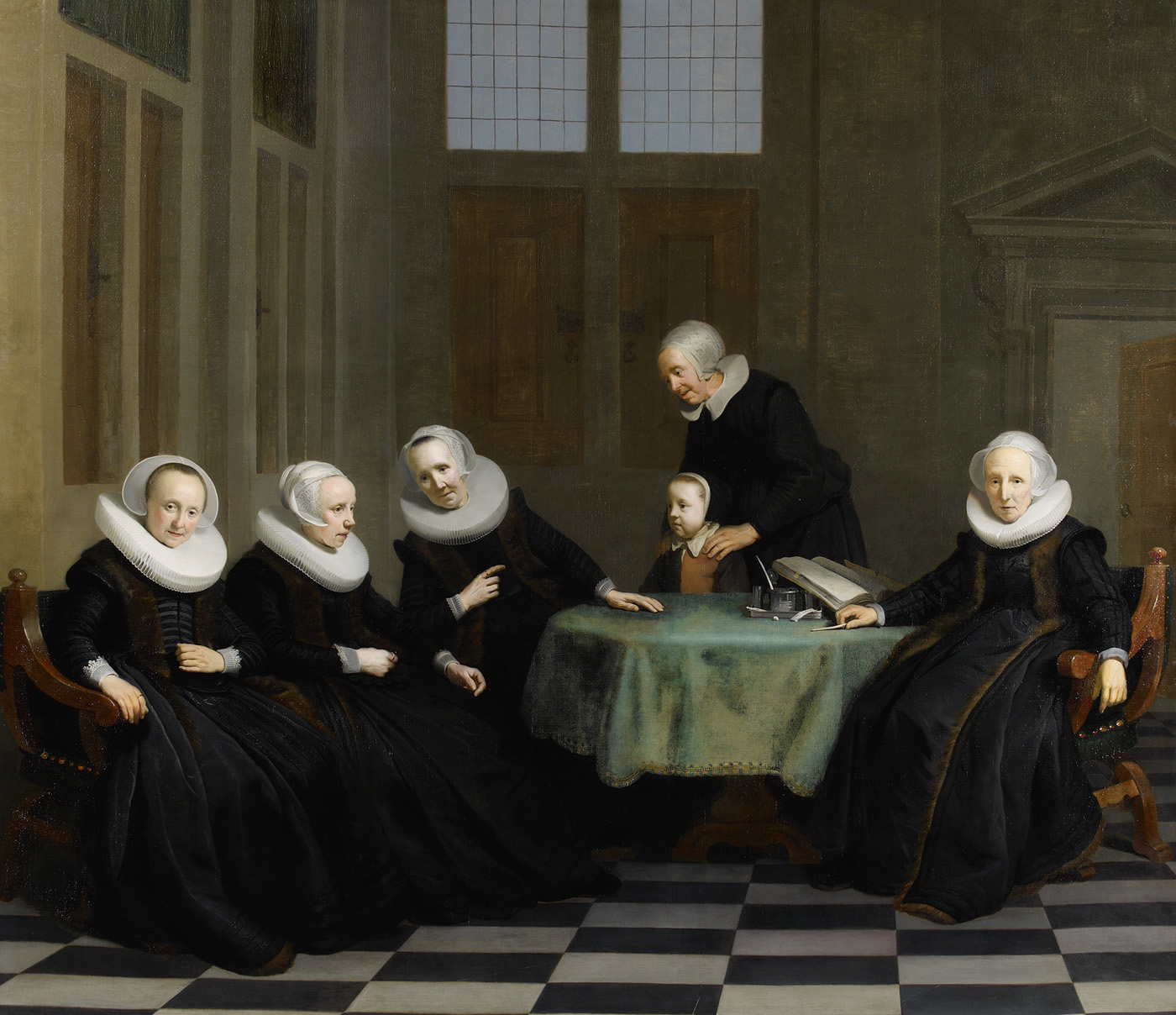
The regents of the cities almshouse with Dieuwertje Bicker (1584–1641) by Jacob Adriaensz Backer (1633)

==== Genealogical and political legacy ====
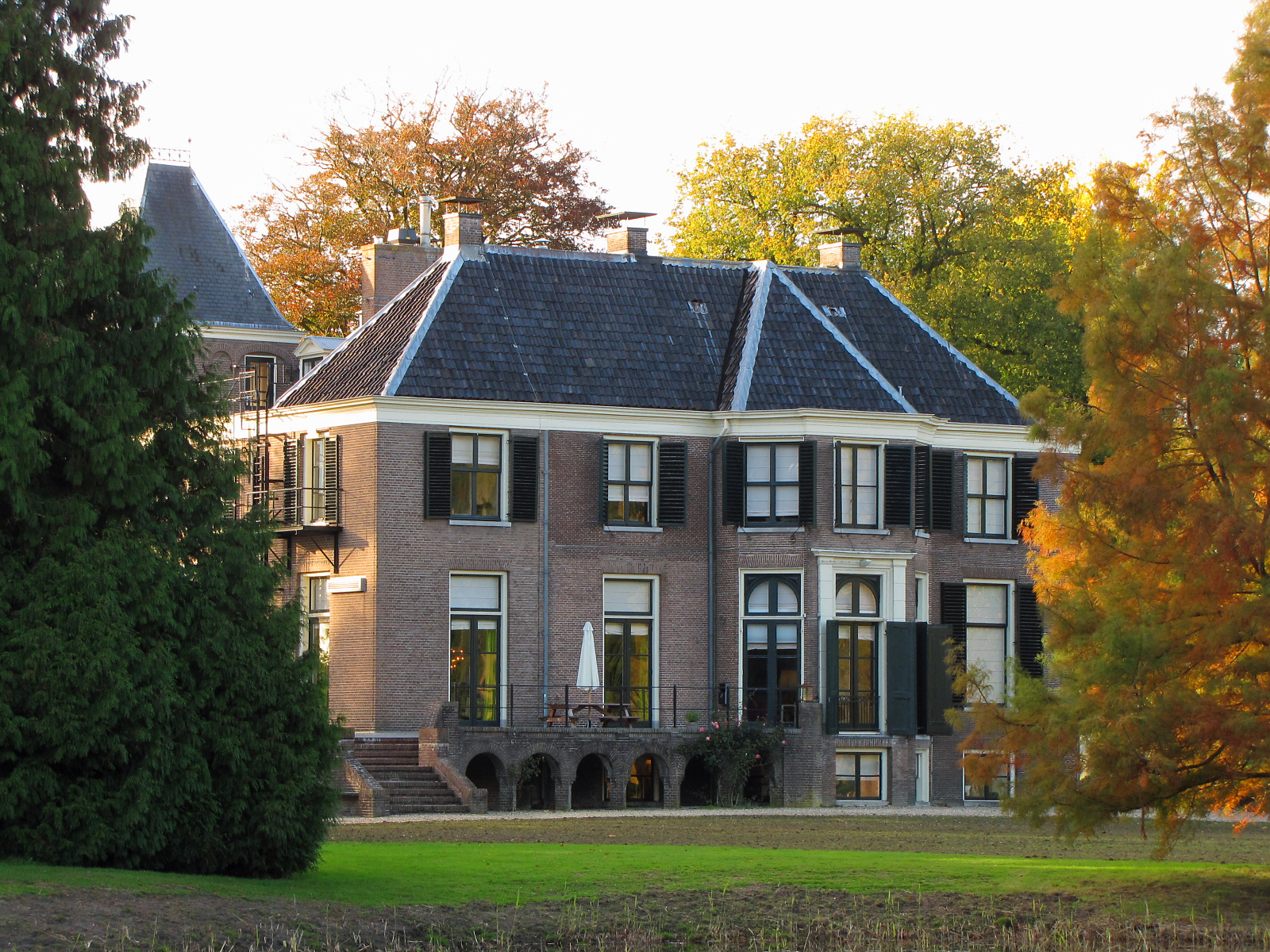
Boekesteyn landhuis

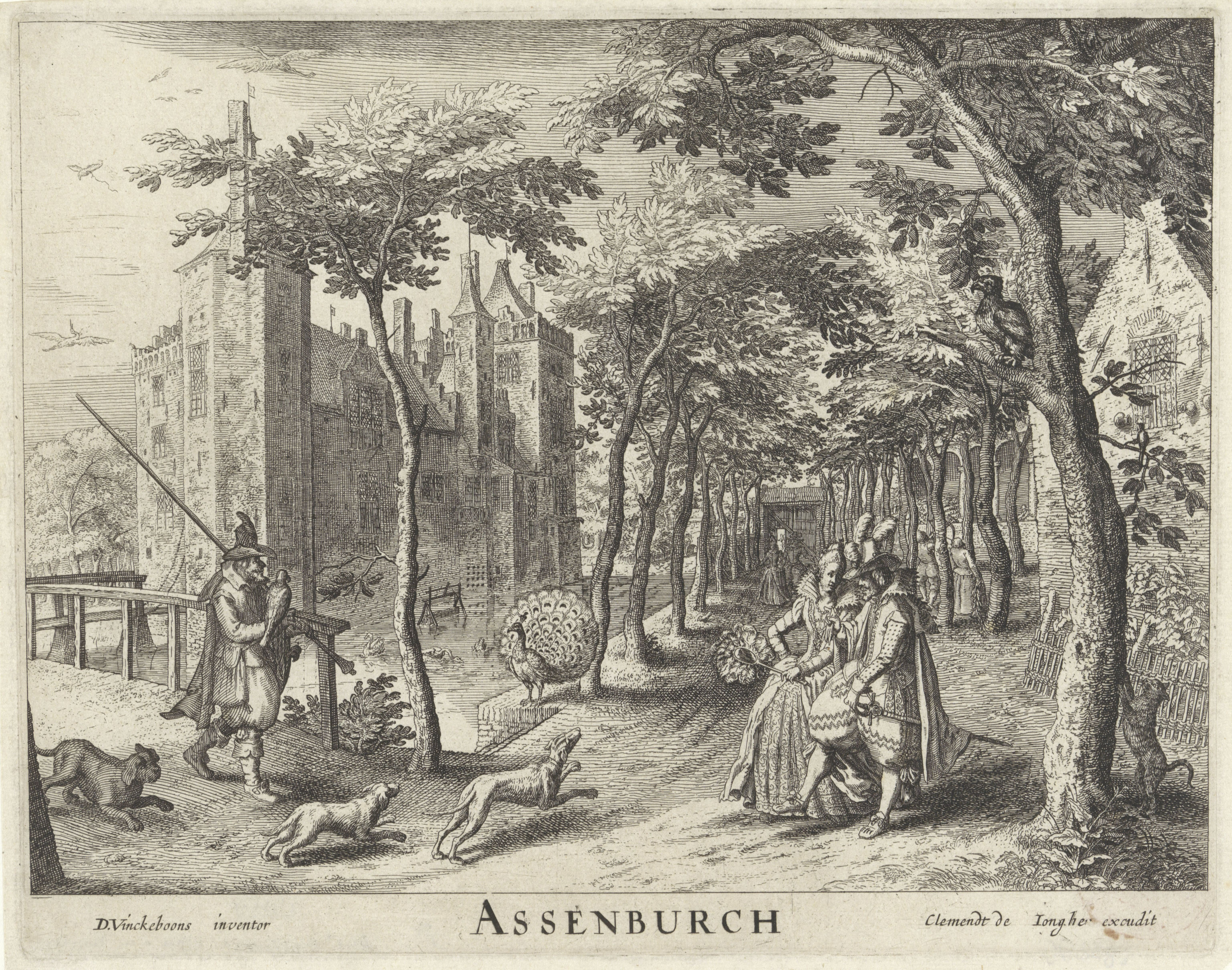
Gezicht op kasteel Assumburg te Heemskerk

While the Dutch Golden Age, Andries and Cornelis Bicker, together with their cousins Cornelis and Andries de Graeff, saw themselves as the political heirs of the old regent family Boelens, whose main lineage, which had remained catholic, had died out in the male line in 1647. Their names Andries and Cornelis came from their Boelens ancestors. As in a real dynasty, members of the two families frequently intermarried in the 17th century in order to keep their political and commercial capital together.

- Elisabeth Bicker (1630–1660) married Jacobus Trip, a lawyer, arms dealer and participant in the WIC.
- Cornelia Bicker was married to the Danish courtier and landowner Joachim Irgens av Vestervig. She joined him on his travels. After her husband became insolvent, she entered into multi-creditor proceedings. She sold half of Spanderswoud to her cousin Geertruid. She died in Vestervig or Copenhagen.
- Catharina Bicker (1642–1678), was married to the Danish Count palatine Jacob de Petersen; she inherited Boekesteyn through her mother and buried in 's-Graveland.
- Geertruid Bicker was married to Jean Deutz, who traded in quicksilver from Idrija. After his death, Geertruid continued to run the company, granted Emperor Leopold I loans during the Great Turkish War against the Ottoman Empire. She bought Spanderswoud from her cousin in 1678 to assist her. In 1692 and 1696, she financed the recruitment of soldiers and sailors for Prince Eugene of Savoy. She financed the emperor in the War of the Spanish Succession; died at Assumburg castle.

==== Branch Bicker van Swieten ====
This branch of the family descended from Cornelis Bicker van Swieten (1592–1654). His descendants continued to use the nickname, which was borrowed from the possessions of the manor and the castle of Swieten, in their name. Some people, such as Cornelis' son Gerard Bicker (I) van Swieten (1632–1716) who was Rekenmeester of Holland, achieved some political importance in the government of Holland. In 1755 this branch died out with his younger son Cornelis Bicker (II) van Swieten.

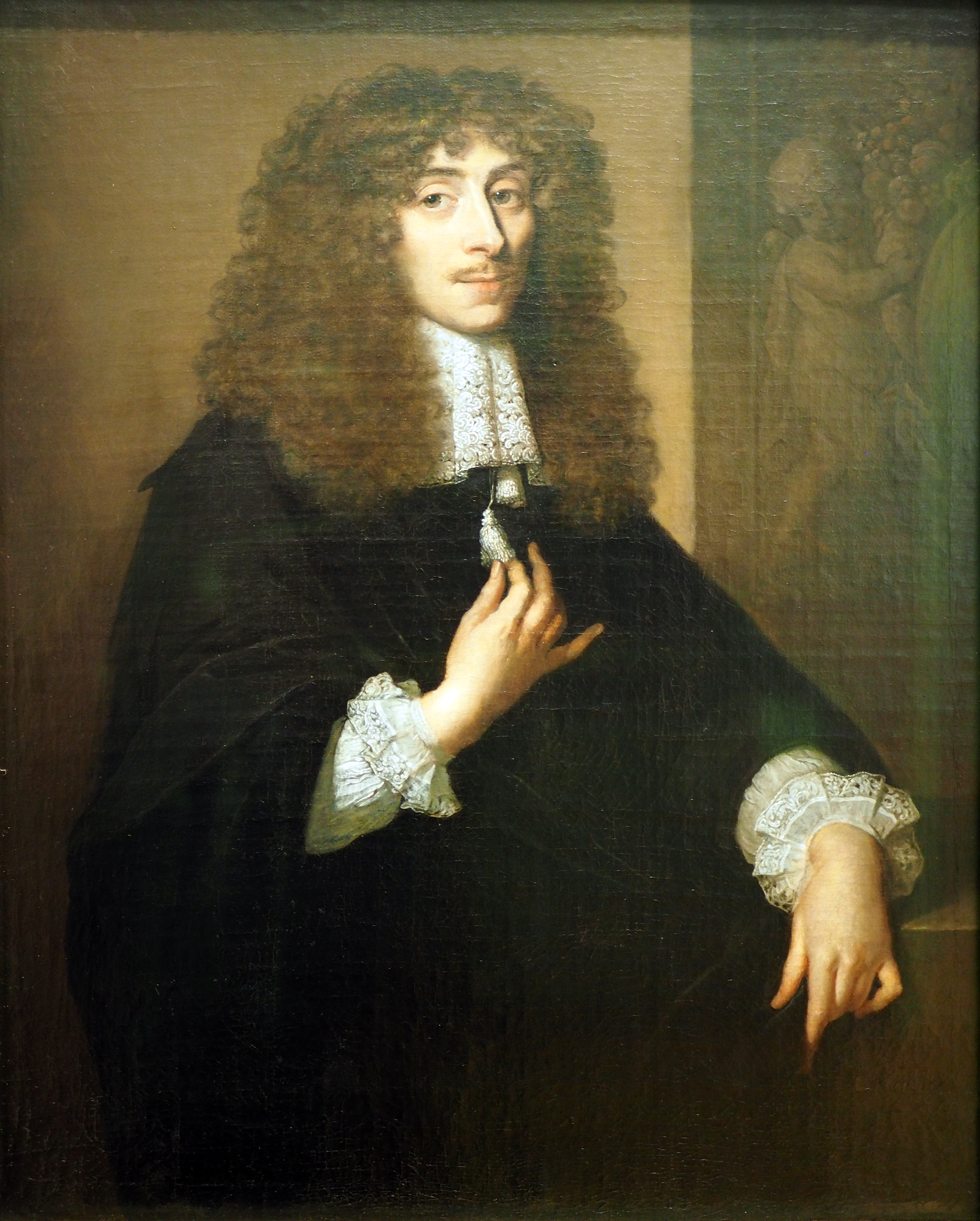
Gerard Bicker (I) van Swieten, Heer van Swieten, painted Caspar Netscher in 1673, Landesmuseum Hannover

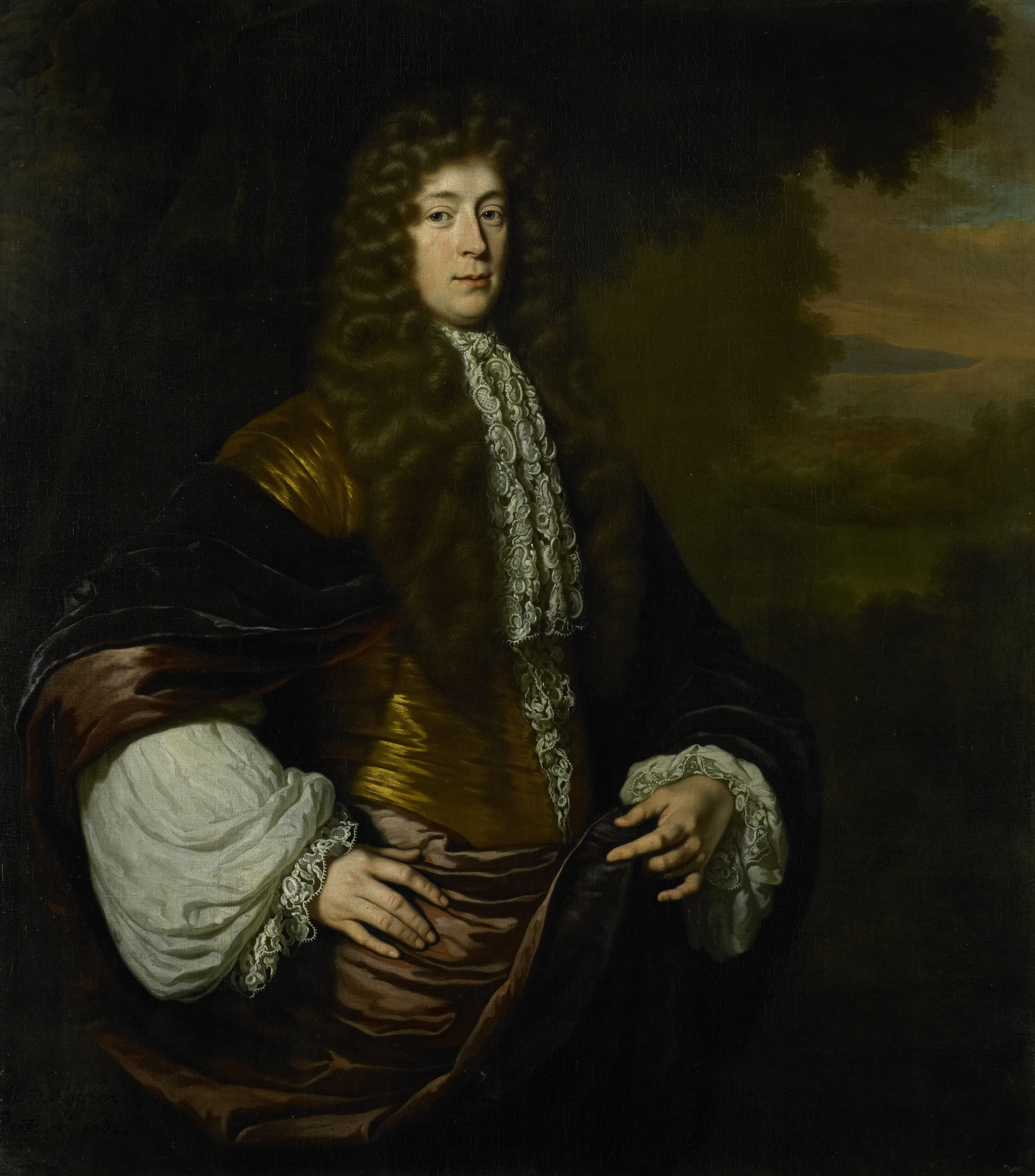
Hendrick Bicker (1649–1718), burgemeester van Amsterdam

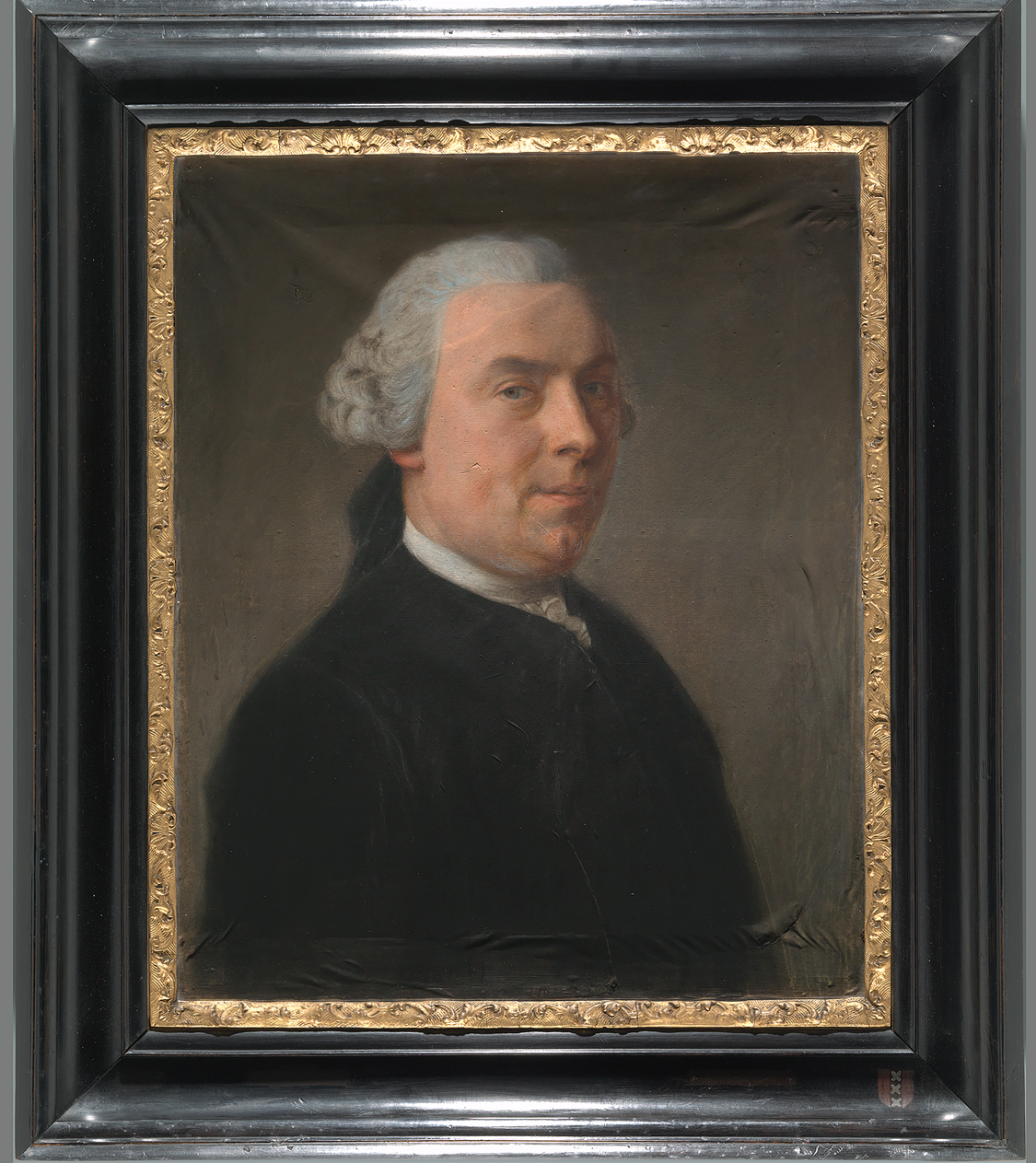
Hendrick Bicker (1722–1783) by Jean Etienne Liotard

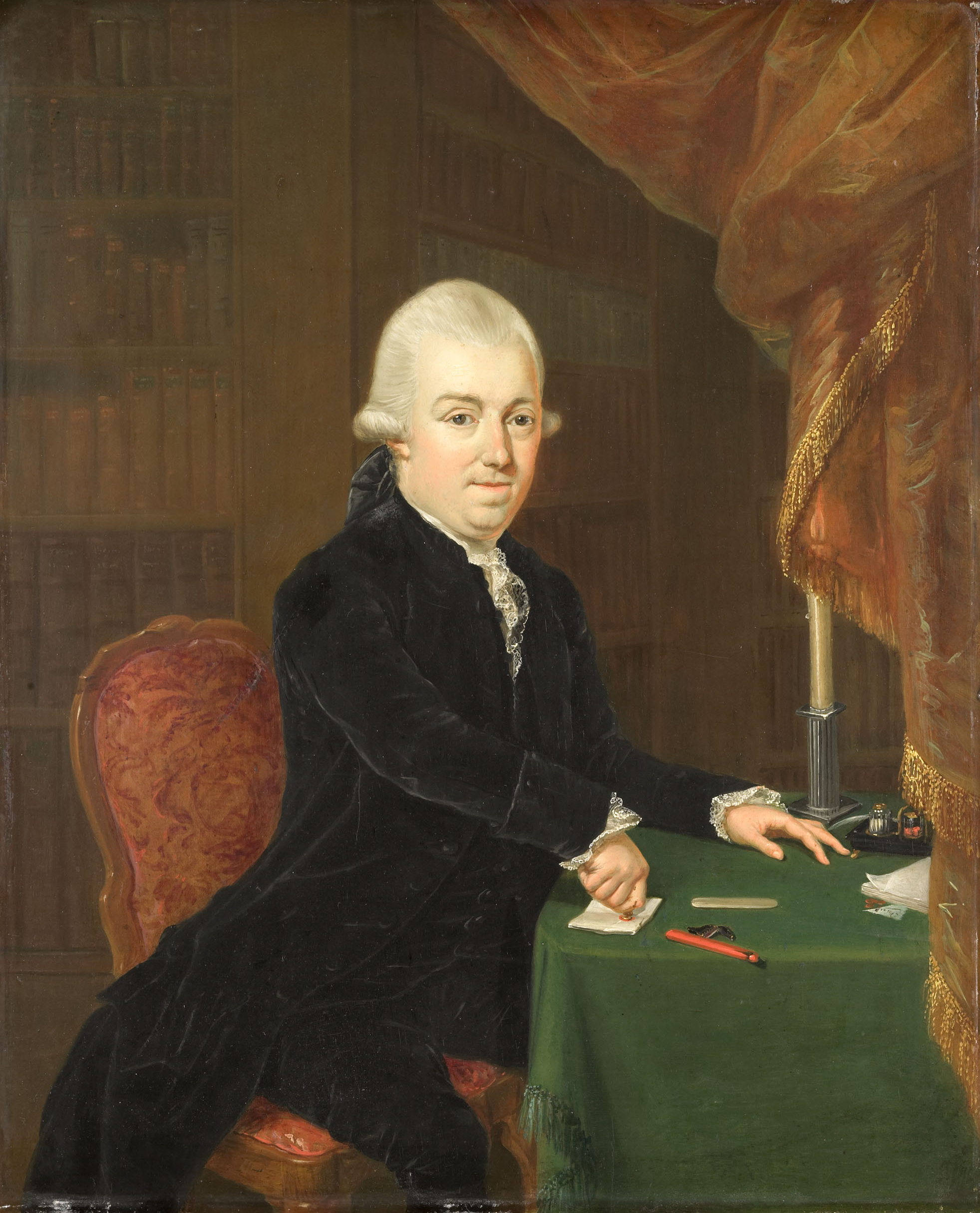
Jan Bernd Bicker III, painted by Louis Bernard Coclers in 1796, Amsterdam Museum

==== Later noble branch ====
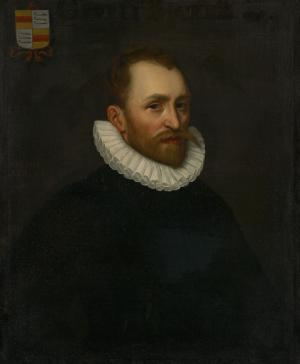
Gerrit Bicker (1554–1604) in 1583 by an anonymous painter

In the period that followed, however, the Bicker family branch, who descended from Jacob P. Bicker (1581–1626), a younger brother of Gerrit Bicker provided two more Amsterdam burgomasters, Hendrik Bicker (1649–1718) and his son Hendrick Bicker (1682–1738). Hendrick's brother Jan Bernd Bicker I (1695–1750) was Drost von Muiden. Hendrick (1722–1783) and Jan Bernd Bicker II (1733–1774) were in charge of the Andries Pels & Soonen in 1750. Jan Bernd Bicker III (1746–1812) was chairman of the National Assembly of the Batavian Republic in 1796 and 1797. His son Henrie Bicker (1777–1834) was introduced to the New Dutch Nobility in 1815 with the predicate Jonkheer. His third son Jhr. Pierre Herbert Bicker (1805–1861) was a manufacturer, hobby artist and a member of the Provincial Council of North Holland.

== Family members (selection) ==
- Dirk Helmer, recorded 1483 and 1490 in Amsterdam
  - Jan Dirksz Helmer, in 1433 Burgemeester of Amsterdam, married Lijsbeth Eggert († around 1468)
    - Dirk Jansz Helmer († 1468), married Geertruid Gerritsdr van den Anxter
      - Gerrit Dirksz Helmer (around 1450–1521/26), named Van den Anxter, married Machteld Pietersdr Bicker (around 1455–1516)
        - Pieter Gerritsz van den Anxter, named Bicker (1497–1567), Schepen of Amsterdam in 1534
          - Pieter Pietersz Bicker (1522–1585), business man, politician, Diplomat, Dutch delegate in Hamburg and Bremen
            - Gerrit Pietersz Bicker (1554–1604), Burgemeester and councillor of Amsterdam, member and one of the founders of the Dutch East India Company (VOC)
              - Andries Bicker (1586–1652), was a powerful Amsterdam regent, ten times burgemeester, member of the vroedschap belonging to the Dutch States Party, envoy to Polen, Denmark, Sweden, representative to the States of Holland and States-General of the Netherlands, lord of Engelenburg, owned property in 's-Graveland, etc.
                - Alida Bicker, married to her 3nd cousin Jacob Jacobsz Bicker (1612–1676), lord of Engelenburg; inherited Boekestein
                - Gerard Bicker (1622–1666), lord of Engelenburg, Baljuw of the Gooi at Muiden Castle
                - Mr Jan Bicker (1626–1657), councillor of the Admiralty of the Noorderkwartier, unmarried
                - Cornelia Bicker (1629–1708), married Joachim Irgens av Vestervig, inherited Spanderswoud
              - Jacob Bicker (1588–1646), lord of Engelenburg, director of the Oostzeevaart, councillor at the Wisselbank, and the Dutch East India Company (VOC), without offspring
              - Jan Bicker (1591–1653), politician, shipbuilder and merchant
                - Lijsbeth Bicker (1630–1660) married Jacobus Trip
                - Geertruid Bicker (1634–1702) married Jean Deutz, bought Spanderswoud from her cousin Cornelia
                - Wendela Bicker (1635–1668) married Johan de Witt
                - Jacoba Bicker (1640–1695), married her cousin Pieter de Graeff
              - Cornelis Bicker lord of Swieten (1592–1654), Burgemeester of Amsterdam, administrator of the Dutch East India Company (VOC), councillor at the Wisselbank, and representative to the States of Holland
                - Elisabeth Bicker van Swieten (1623–1656), married her uncle and 2nd cousin Andries de Graeff
                - Gerard Bicker (I) van Swieten (1632–1716), free lord of Oud-Haarlem and Kortenbosch, lord of Swieten, Rekenmeester of Holland
                  - Gerard Bicker (II) van Swieten (1687–1753), knight banneret of Baronnye and of high Lordship Kessel, Lord of Swieten, Heikoop and Boeikoop, advisor of Amsterdam
            - Jacob Pietersz Bicker (1555–1587)
              - Jacob Jacobsz Bicker (1581–1626)
                - Eva Bicker (1609–1655), married to her 2nd cousin Dirk de Graeff and Frederick Alewijn
                - Roelof Bicker (1611–1656), Schepen van Amsterdam, captain of the schutterij (Citizens Guard) and painted by Bartholomeus van der Helst
                - Jacob Jacobsz Bicker (1612–1676), Knight of St Marcus, Captain Major of the garrison in Amsterdam and Schepen of 's-Graveland; married to his 3nd cousin Alida Bicker, daughter of his 2nd cousin Andries Bicker (1586–1652)
                  - Catharina Bicker (1642–1678), married Jacob de Petersen
                - Hendrick Jacobsz Bicker (1615–1651), captain of the schutterij, married Eva Geelvinck
                  - Jacob Hendricksz Bicker (1642–1713) married Sara Hinlopen
                  - Hendrik Bicker (1649–1718), Burgemeester of Amsterdam married Maria Schaep
                    - Hendrick Bicker (1682–1738), Ambachtsheer of Amstelveen and Nieuwer-Amstel, Burgemeester of Amsterdam
                      - Hendrick Bicker (1724–1745)
                    - Jan Bernd Bicker I (1695–1750) married Johanna Sara Pels in 1720, baljuw of Muiden and Gooi
                      - Henric Bicker (1722–1783) joined Andries Pels & Soonen
                        - Jan Bernd Bicker III (1746–1812), politician, member of the National Assembly and president of the Batavian Republic's executive organ, the Staatsbewind
                          - Jhr. Henrie Bicker (1777–1834), admitted to the New Dutch Nobility as Jonkheer in 1815, member of the Nobility Assembly
                            - Jhr. Jean Bernd Andre Bicker (* 1803)
                            - Jhr. Pierre Théodore Bicker (1804–1854)
                              - Jhr. Frédéric Louis Bicker (1835–1903)
                                - Jhr. Willem Bicker (1865–1942)
                                  - Jhr. Frédéric Louis Bicker(* 1900)
                                    - Jhr. Robert Elphinstone Bicker (* 1931)
                                - Jhr. Pierre Herbert Bicker (1866–1945)
                            - Jhr. Pierre Herbert Bicker (1805–1861), member of the Provincial Council of North Holland
                            - Jhr. Daniel Bicker (1808–1880)
                              - Jhr. Daniel Bicker (1842–1877)
                                - Jhr. Jean Jacques Oscar Bicker (1870–1944)
                                - Jhr. Eduard William Estien Bicker (1876–1925)
                                  - Jhr. Daniël Bicker (1901–1970)
                                  - Jhr. Edward William Estien Bicker (1905–1979)
                                  - Jhr. August George Bicker (1914–1975)
                      - Andries Bicker (1724–1770)
                      - Johanna Sara Bicker (1731–1801) married Vice-Admiral Pieter Hendrik Reijnst
                      - Jan Bernd Bicker II (1733–1774), married Catharina Boreel, joined Andries Pels & Soonen
            - Laurens Bicker (1563–1606), Dutch admiral, trader and merchant at Guinea

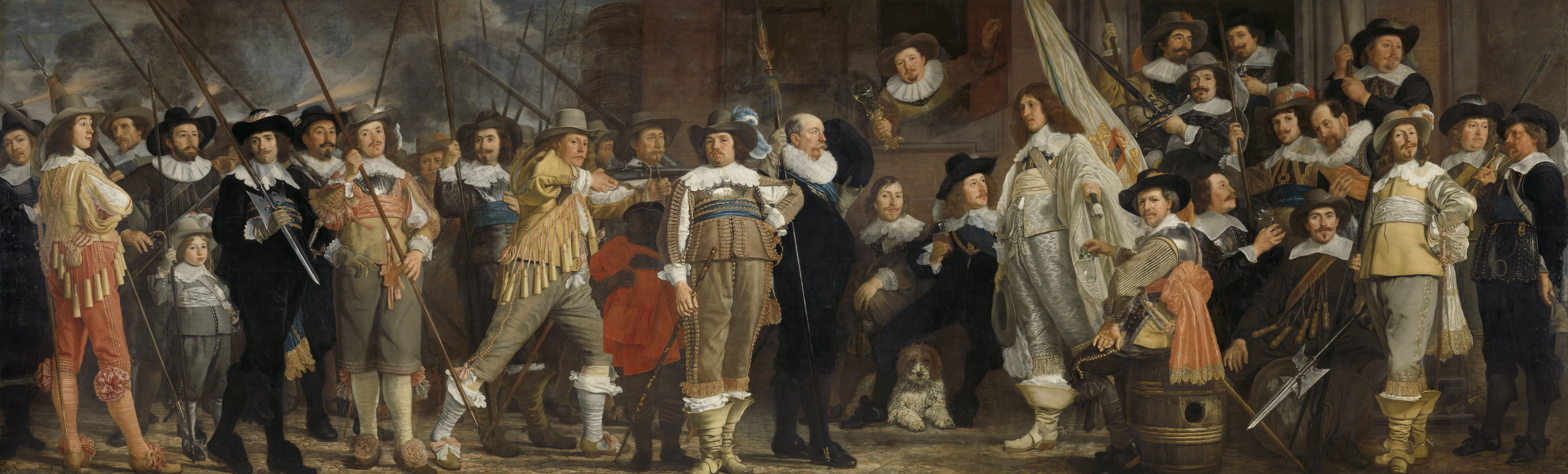

== Coat of arms ==
Coat of arms

Description:

Quartered, I and IV in gold a red crossbar Van den Anxter [maternal ancestors], II and III in silver three black tillers Helmer(s) [paternal ancestors] placed one above the other, A half-sighted helmet, wrinkled silver and red, tarpaulins red and gold, helmet sign an emerging beard man of natural colour on a silver pedestal, dressed in old red clothes, gold knotted and decorated and with an old-fashioned red cap, gold decorated, holding with the right hand at the back and with the left hand at the front a golden torch.

== Literature ==
- Jonathan I. Israel (1995) The Dutch Republic – Its Rise, Greatness, and Fall – 1477–1806, Clarendon Press, Oxford, ISBN 978-0-19-820734-4
- Herbert H. Rowen (1986) John de Witt – Statesman of the "True Freedom", Cambridge University Press, ISBN 0-521-52708-2
- Kees Zandvliet (2006) De 250 rijksten van de Gouden Eeuw – Kapitaal, macht, familie en levensstijl Nieuw Amsterdam Uitgevers
- Peter Burke (1994) Venice and Amsterdam. A study of seventeenth-century élites.
- Matthias Laurenz Gräff (2025) Bickerse League. The story of a political and economic power factor in Amsterdam and Holland during the Dutch Golden Age
- Matthias Laurenz Gräff (2025) Bicker-De Graeff clan. A historical picture of the political power force during the Dutch Golden Age
