= Andries Pels =

Dutch banker and insurer

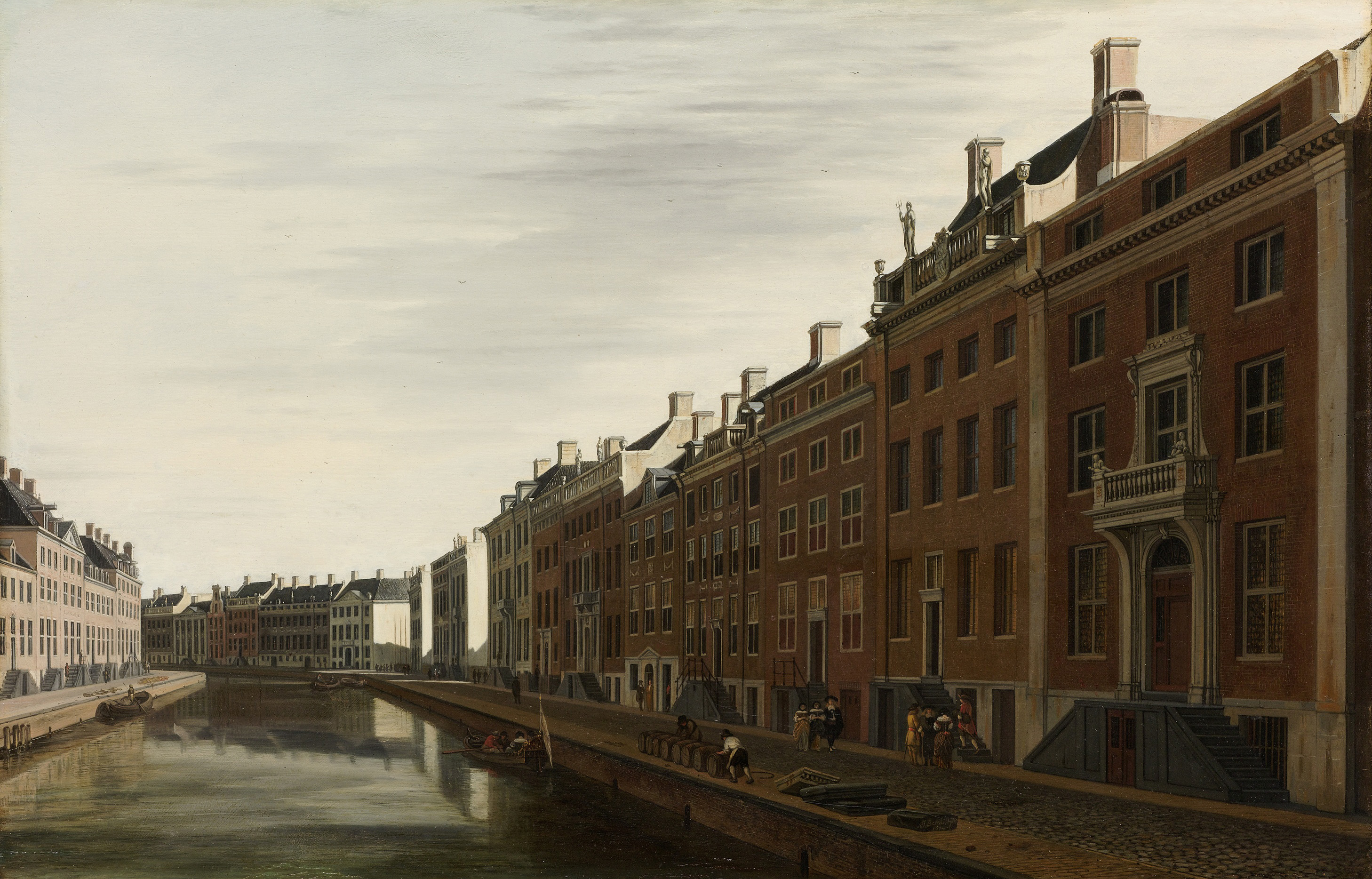
The bend of the Herengracht, seen from the Leidsestraat with the house of Andries Pels on the far left. Painting by Gerrit Adriaensz Berckheyde

Andries Pels (2 September 1655, in Amsterdam – 8 February 1731) was a wealthy Dutch banker and insurer. He began as someone who had devoted himself to the merchandise trade, along with his brother Guillelmo, but after the latter's death in 1705 he concentrated more and more on the money and exchange business. In 1707, he founded the firm Andries Pels & Sons, the largest merchant bank of the first half of the 18th century, that lasted until 1774.

== Andries Pels & Sons ==
The firm traded in sugar, tobacco, cocoa, rice, rye, salt and hemp, but also financed salvages of stranded ships. After the foundation of St. Peterburg, Pels had ships loaded at Kronstadt with grain, linseed, tallow, potash, and tar, as well as rhubarb. Between December 1712 and March 1714, James Brydges, paymaster of the Forces, conducted transactions through Pels' account with a total value of more than half a million guilders. His bank money transactions at the Wisselbank doubled between 1686 and in 1726 and surpassed Clifford & Co. In 1715 the turnover of the firm at the Wisselbank was 21 million; 1725 26 million; 1736 20 million; in 1746 20 million; in 1755 20 million and in 1765 18 million.

Pels was the banker of France in the era of John Law. After the death of Andries Pels in 1731, his two sons continued the firm; in 1739 with Willem Munter, their brother-in-law. In 1744, the bank lent 15 million to France. The bank was involved in France's payment of war reparations to prisoners of war after the Treaty of Aix-la-Chapelle (1748). Until 1750, the firm was the leading banking house in Europe, "shrouded in a haze of wealth, fame and arcane power", but hardly seems to have grown any more in contrast to Hope & Co.

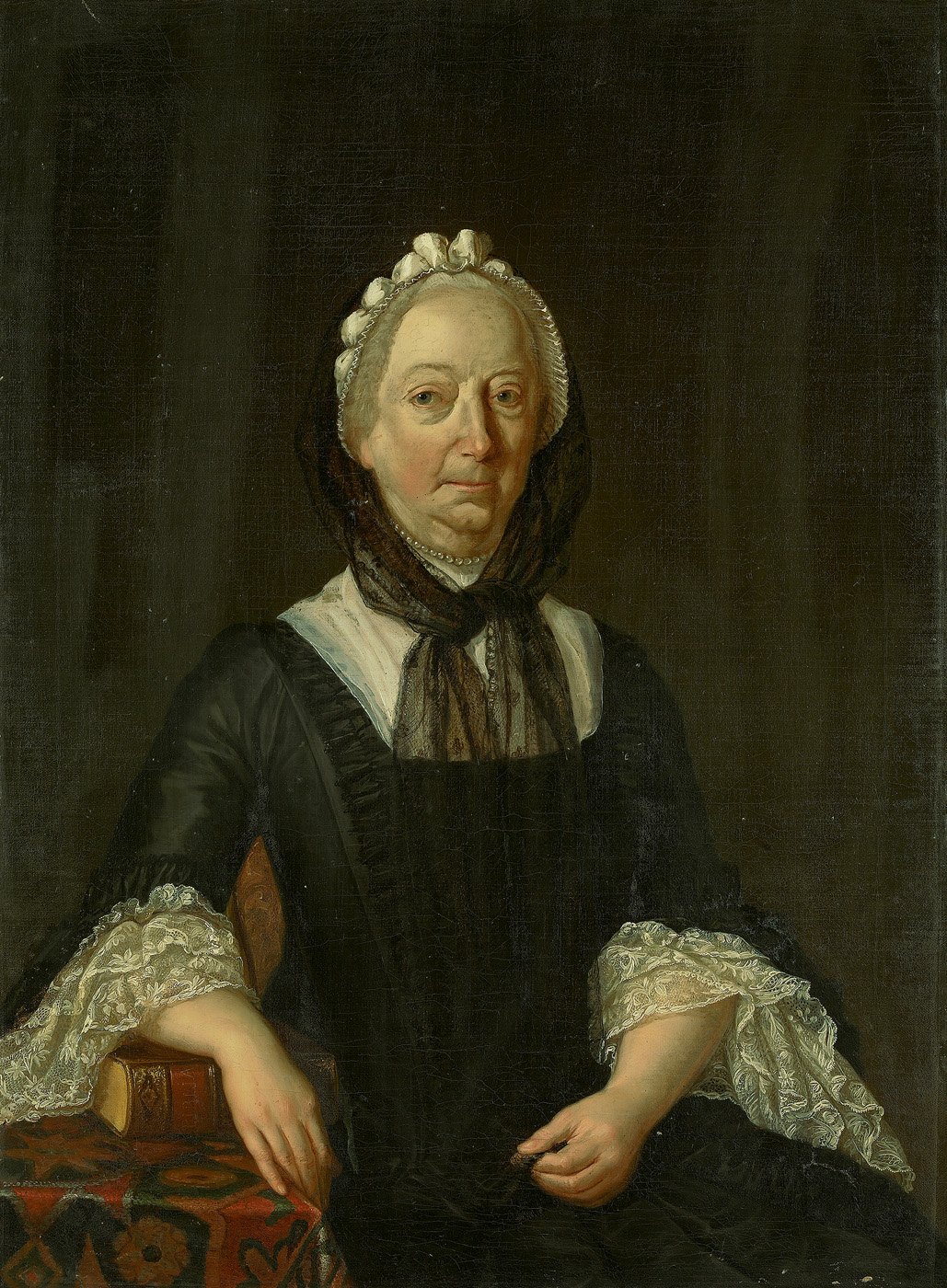
Johanna Sara Pels (1702-1791)

In 1757 Frederick the Great wanted to take out a loan of half a million from the bank. The mayors of Amsterdam referred Hendric Bicker to Pieter Steyn. At the end of the Seven Years' War (1756-1763), the bank temporarily revived. During the Amsterdam banking crisis of 1763 there was a great lack of cash; the bank was not prepared to prop up Leendert Pieter de Neufville, but preferred a loan to Heinrich Carl von Schimmelmann the owner of four large cotton and sugar cane plantations in the Danish West Indies (today the American Virgin Islands in the Caribbean).

In 1767 Jan Bernd Bicker started to work as an apprentice; years later he became a member of the board. In 1771 the bank together with Adrian Hope bought negotiaties for 904,000 guilders. It is unclear how much the bank was involved in the crisis of 1772 and the fall of the EIC-stocks. In May 1773 the bank went on for another year. When his uncle died in March 1774, the company came to an end.

== Family ==
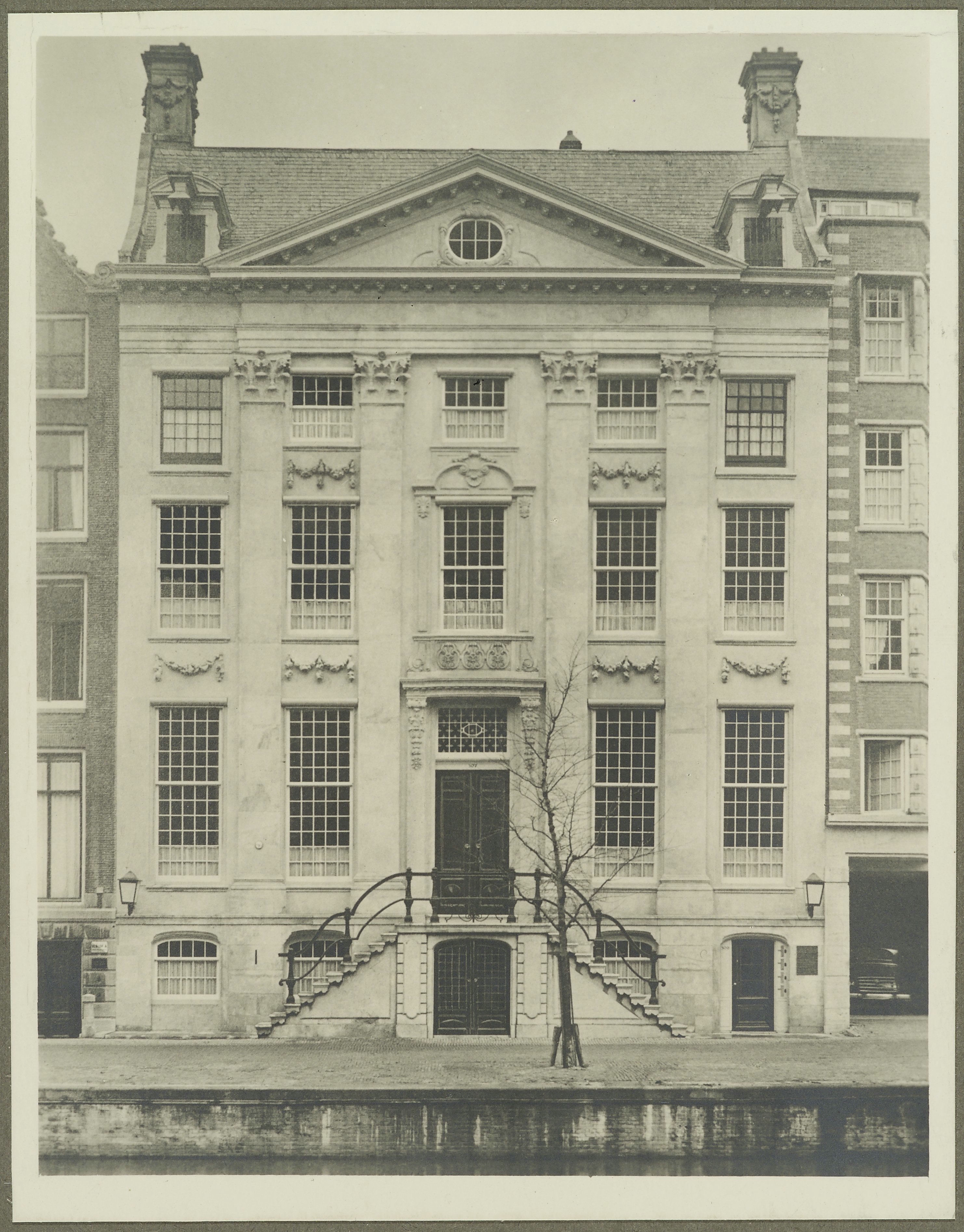
Herengracht 507: the mansion of Pels

The Pels family originated in 's-Hertogenbosch and was involved in city government as early as the 15th and 16th centuries. Aarnout or Arnold Pels went to Antwerp in an unknown year. His children fled to Germany after the fall of Antwerp. Via Frankenthal and Hanau-Neustadt, some of his descendants eventually arrived in Utrecht and Amsterdam. Other members of the family moved to Cologne, Hamburg, and Stade.

He was nephew of his namesake, the poet Andries Pels, and cousin to governor Paulus van der Veen from whom he inherited a number of plantations in Suriname. In 1742 his widow, Angenita Pels-Bouwens (1660–1749), was the richest woman in Amsterdam, living at the Golden Bend. In 1720, his daughter Johanna Sara had married Jan Bernd Bicker. Their sons Henric en Jan Bernd Bicker managed the bank from 1750. In 1758 Giacomo Casanova was commissioned by Madame d’Urfé to sell a share package of the Swedish East India Company in Holland. He met Pels and several other bankers on selling French state bonds to fill the treasure. (Note: They offered him ten millions in hard cash and seven millions in paper money, bearing interest at five or six per cent, with a deduction of one per cent brokerage. Furthermore, they would forgive a sum of twelve hundred thousand florins owed by the French East India Company to the Dutch East India Company.) In December he was invited to go ice sailing with "Mr Pels".

== See also ==
- List of banks in the Netherlands
