= Jean-Baptiste Coclers =

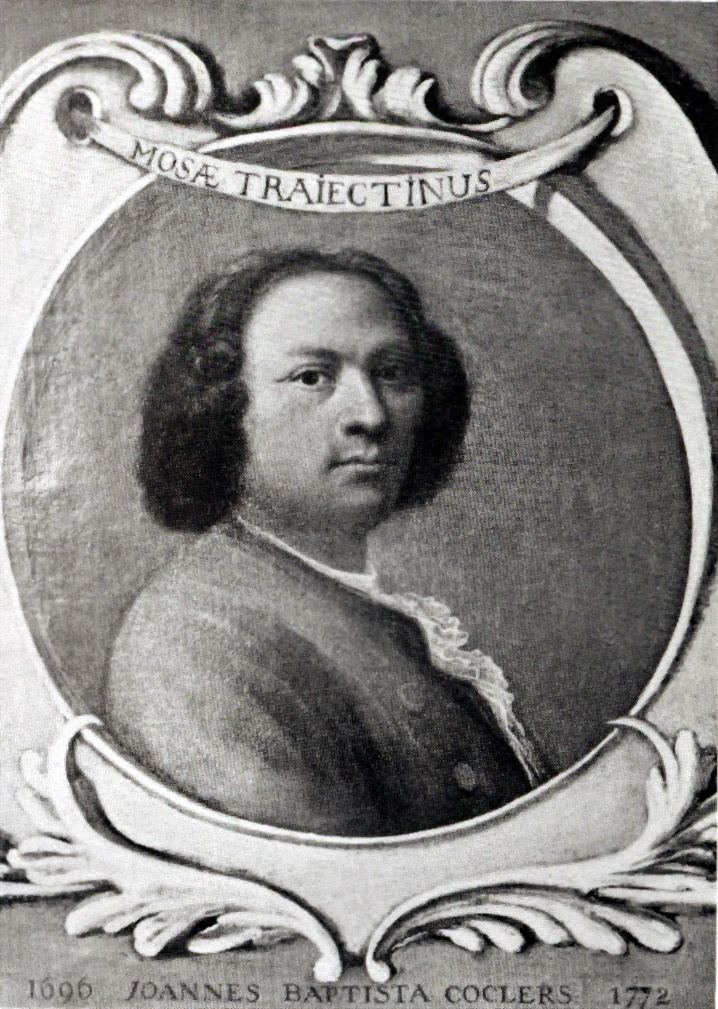
Self portrait J.-B. Coclers in the Maastricht town hall

Jean-Baptiste Coclers (Maastricht, 14 October 1696 – Liège, 23 May 1772) was a Southern Netherlandish portrait painter and a painter of floral still lifes and historical subjects.

== Life ==
Jean-Baptiste Pierre Coclers was born in Maastricht in 1696. He was the son and pupil of the Liège painter Philippe Coclers who then lived in Maastricht but in 1702 moved back to Liège.

From 1713 till 1729 he studied in Rome with Sebastiano Conca and Marco Benefial, and worked together with the landscape painter Giovanni Niccolò Servandoni.

After his Italian years, Coclers worked some time in Marseille (1729–31), where he painted a large fresco in the bourse (destroyed). From 1731 till 1738 he worked in Maastricht, after which he established himself in Liège, where he was made court painter of the prince-bishops Georges-Louis de Berghes, John Theodore of Bavaria and Charles-Nicolas d'Oultremont.

Jean-Baptiste Coclers died in 1772 as a wealthy man and a painter with a big reputation. After his death however, his reputation declined rapidly.

His son Louis Bernard Coclers also became a well-known painter. A second son, Philippe Henri Coclers van Wyck, established himself as a painter in Marseille and became director of the art academy there. His daughter, Marie-Lambertine Coclers, was known for engraving plates in the style of Adriaan van Ostade.

== Works ==
- Portrait of a canon (1731), Bonnefanten Museum, Maastricht;
- The apostle Peter (1737) in the church in Bemelen;
- Ceiling painting in the town hall of Maastricht (1737); removed in 1955 because of water damage, now in the Bonnefanten Museum;
- Chimney pieces in the town hall of Sint-Truiden;
- Unknown paintings in the town hall of Liège;
- Floral still life (1758) and other works in museum Grand Curtius in Liège.
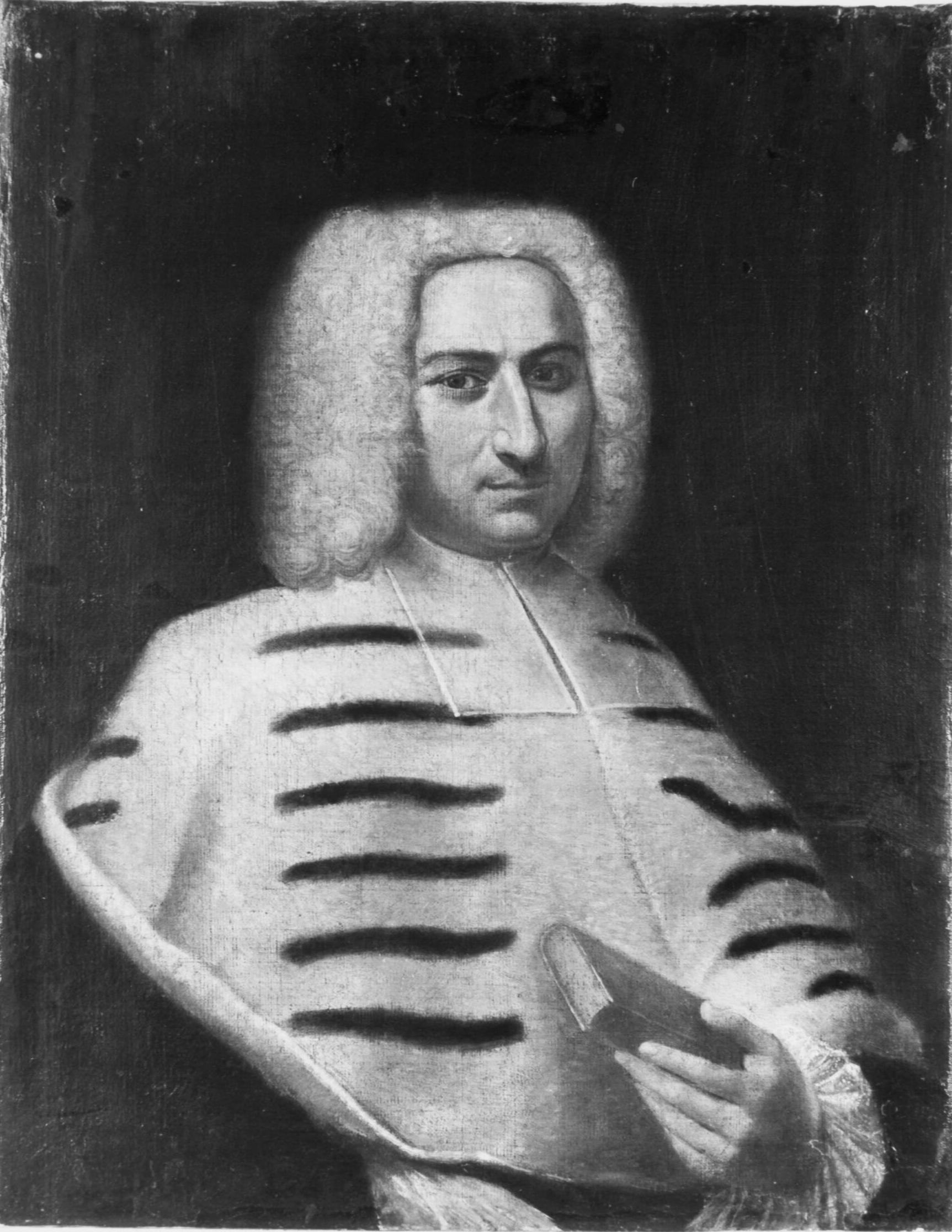
Portrait of a canon

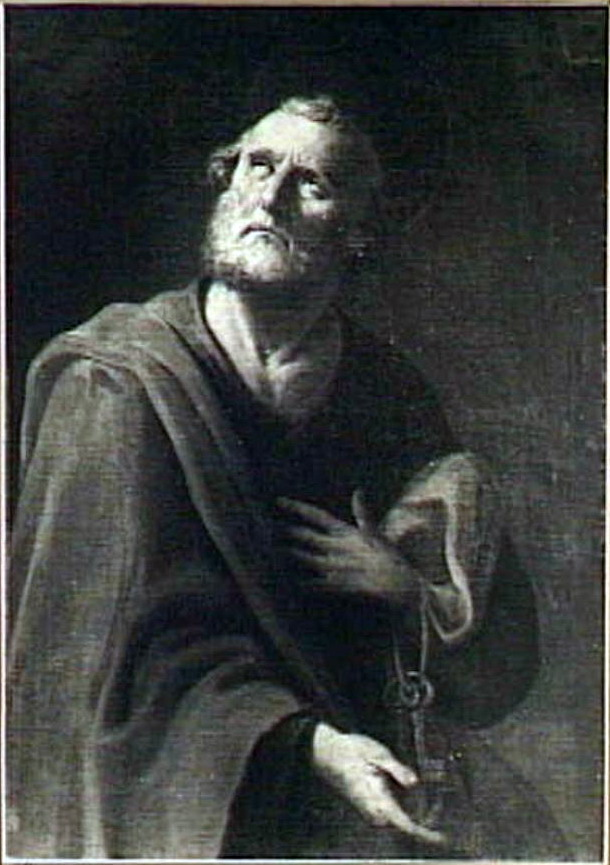
The apostle Peter

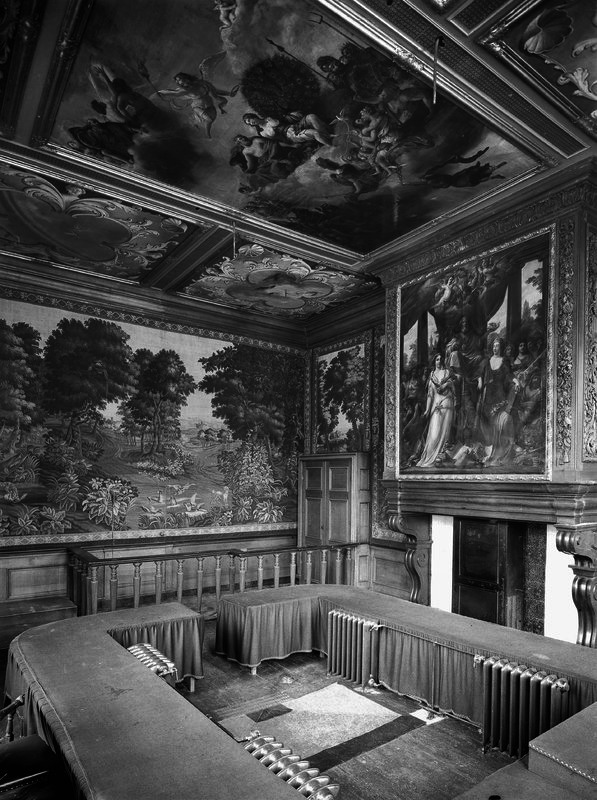
Ceiling painting, Maastricht

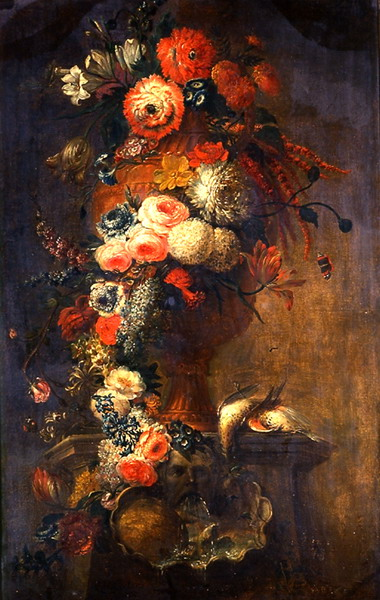
Floral still life

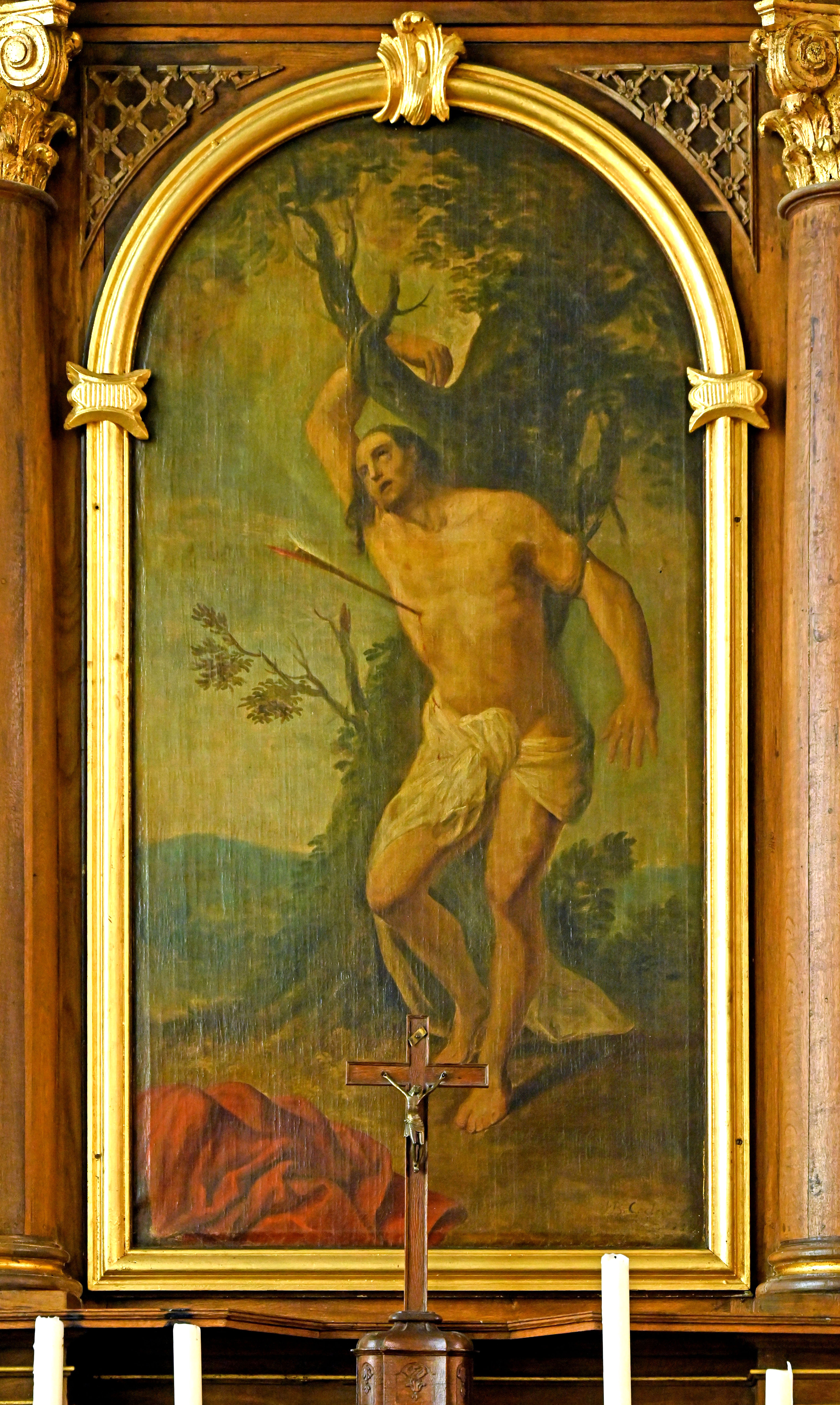
Altar of St Sebastian, Charneux (1759)
