= Jan Bernd Bicker =

Dutch merchant and politician

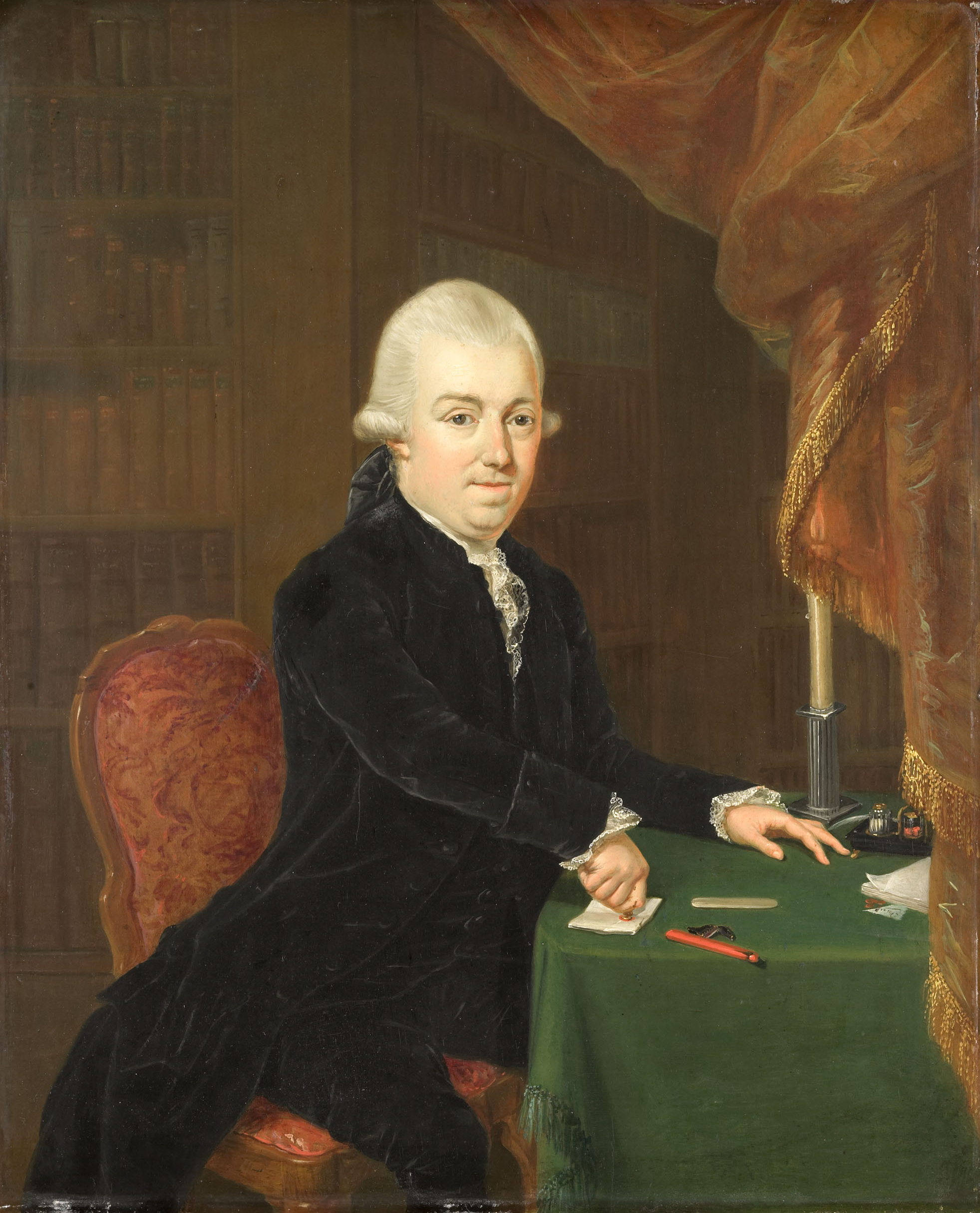
Jan Bernd Bicker in 1796, portrait by Louis-Bernard Coclers.

Jan Bernd Bicker (27 August 1746, Amsterdam – 16 December 1812, Wassenaar) was a Dutch merchant, politician and a member of the very powerful Bicker family.

== Life ==
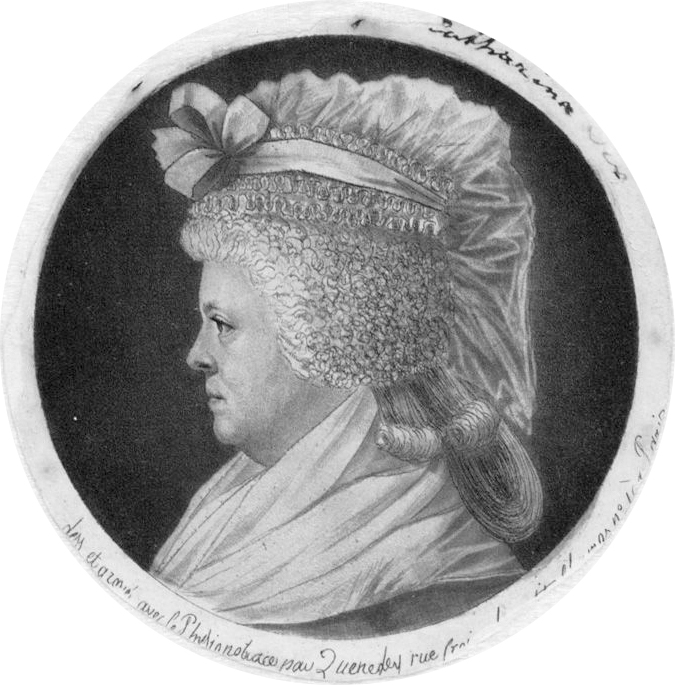
Physionotrace of Catharina Six (1752–1793) by Edme Quenedey des Ricets in 1790.

After studying law and philosophy in Utrecht, he joined the bank Andries Pels & Soonen, founded by his grandfather Andries Pels (1655 - 1731). He served as an alderman in the city council and as an administrator of the Amsterdam branch of the Dutch West India Company (WIC) and was director of the Society of Suriname.

Bicker was opposed to the House of Orange and supported the Patriots, a liberal group that wanted to curtail the power of the Stadtholder. A political conservative, he disliked the democrats within the Patriotic movement. Because of his opposition to the Stadtholder, he was forced to leave the country when the latter, after the Prussian invasion of Holland, removed the Patriots from power. Bicker settled in Brussels and later in Sèvres. There he was in contact with other leading members of the Patriotic movement who had left the Dutch Republic in October 1787. Together they formed a Revolutionary Committee. In April 1794, during the Great Terror, he left Nantes and settled in Biel.

After the Armée du Nord had occupied the country in January 1795 the Patriots returned; Bicker arrived in May. Meanwhile the Dutch Republic was renamed Bataafse Republiek. Bicker was elected a member of the National Assembly and belonged to more conservative Moderaten (moderates). Despite his conservative leanings he opposed slavery and supported reforms.

The coup d'état of 22 January 1798 by Herman Willem Daendels, Pieter Vreede and Wybo Fijnje and his supporters (radical Unitarians), had to guarantee "the unity and indivisibility" of the Batavian republic. The group behind Vreede was dissatisfied with the conservative-moderate majority in parliament, which tried to prevent the formulation of a more democratic, centralized constitution. It broke the power of the Moderates and Federalists. Opponents, like Bicker, were rounded up and imprisoned without charge. Bicker did not end up in Huis ten Bosch, but in Wijk bij Duurstede. In March he, his son and a servant were transferred to Leeuwarden and imprisoned for 11 weeks in three spacious upper rooms of the Princessehof. The coup did not bring the expected results, and Daendels supported another coup d'état on 12 June and Bicker was released.

He was a member of the executive organ, the Staatsbewind, from 1803 to 1805. He played no role during the Kingdom of Holland (1806–1811), but honoured as Chevalier de la Légion d'honneur. He retired from the public scene and lived at his estate Oosterbeek at Wassenaar. He kept ornamental birds and grew pineapples. He died at age 66.

== Family ==
Jan Bernd Bicker was married to Catharina Six on 23 May 1769 in Amsterdam. She was a scion of the powerful Six family. The couple had nine children. Their son, Henric Bicker (1777–1834), who accompanied his parents in exile in 1787, was ennobled by King William I in 1815. Henric became an untitled member of the Dutch nobility.

== Source ==
- Bisselink, M.N.: Jan Bernd Bicker: een patriot in ballingschap 1787–1795, VU Boekhandel/Press 1983, ISBN 9062562639
