= Marie-Lambertine Coclers =

Dutch artist (1761– after 1815)

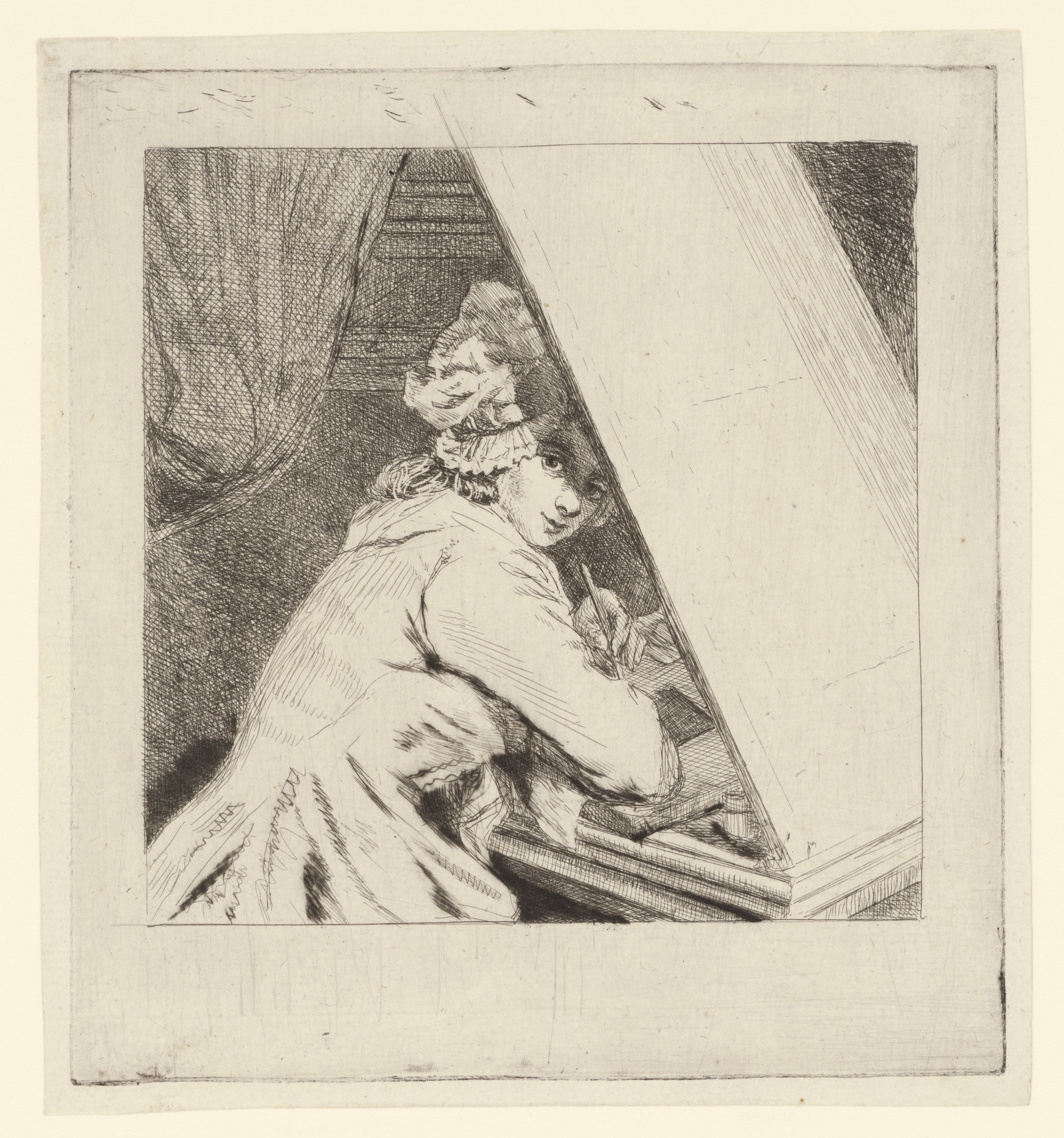
- Portrait by her brother
- Born: Marie-Lambertine Coclers ca. 1761; Liège, Holy Roman Empire
- Died: ca. 1815 n/a
- Occupation: Painter
- Parent: Jean-Baptiste Coclers (mother)

Marie-Lambertine Coclers (1761 – after 1815) was a pastel artist and engraver born in the Holy Roman Empire.

Born in Liège, Coclers was the daughter of Jean-Baptiste Coclers, who died during her childhood. Her instructor was her elder brother, Jean-Baptiste-Bernard Coclers; he made an etching of a young female artist at work which might depict his sister. She came from a family with many artists. She worked in Amsterdam for a while and there she adapted the style of Adriaen van Ostade.

== Gallery ==
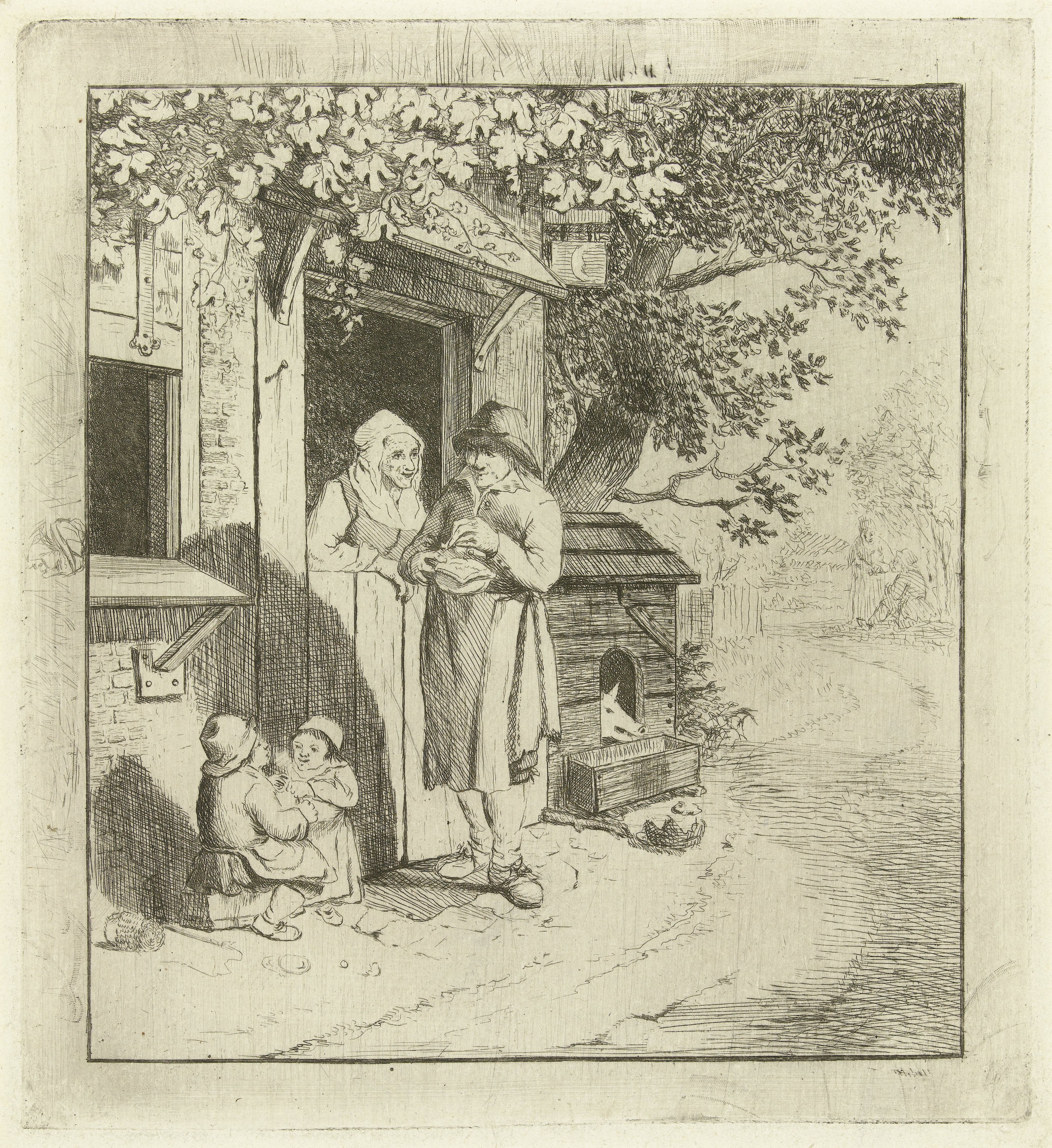
Man at the door of an inn

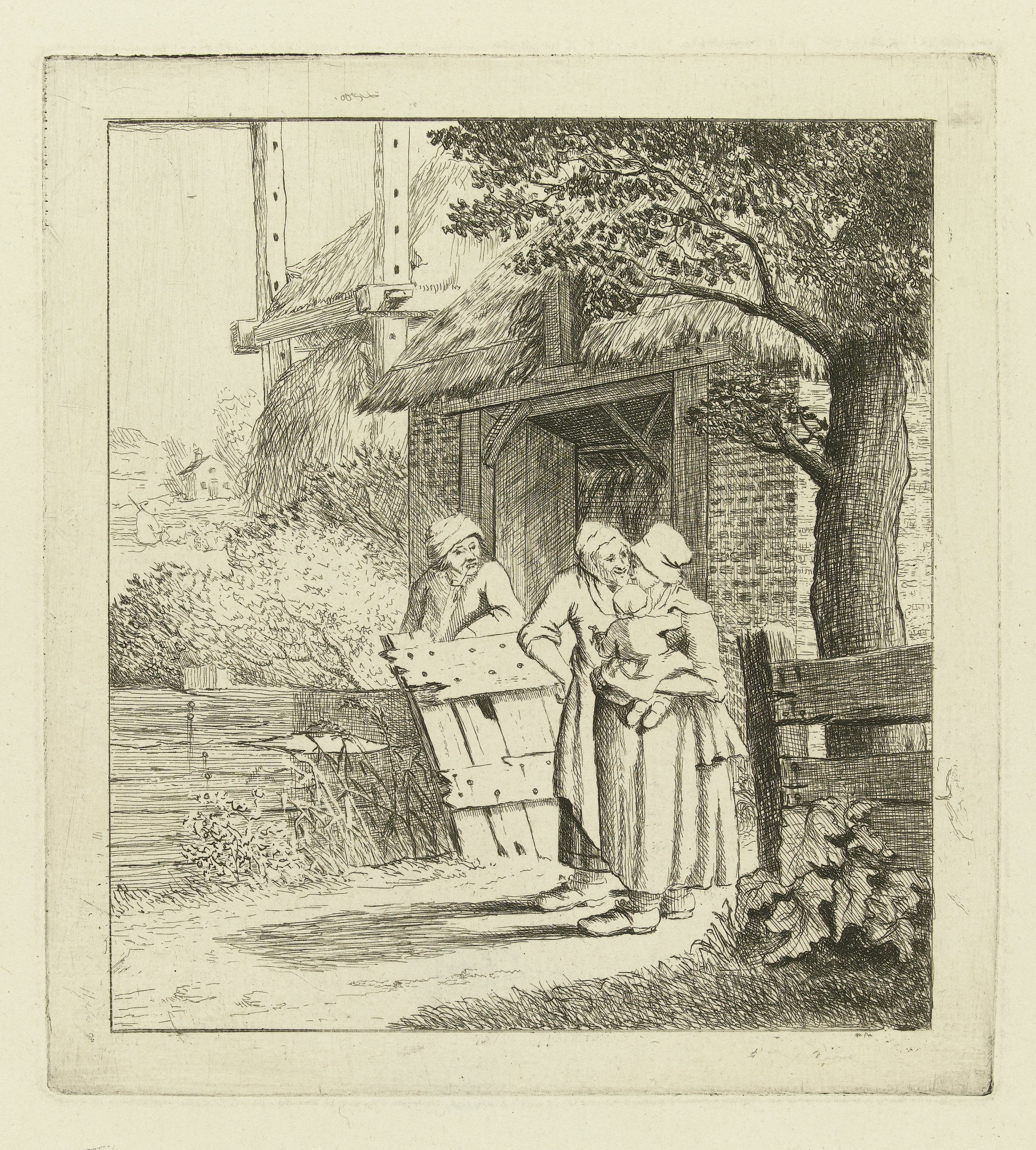
Two women and a man in front of a farmhouse

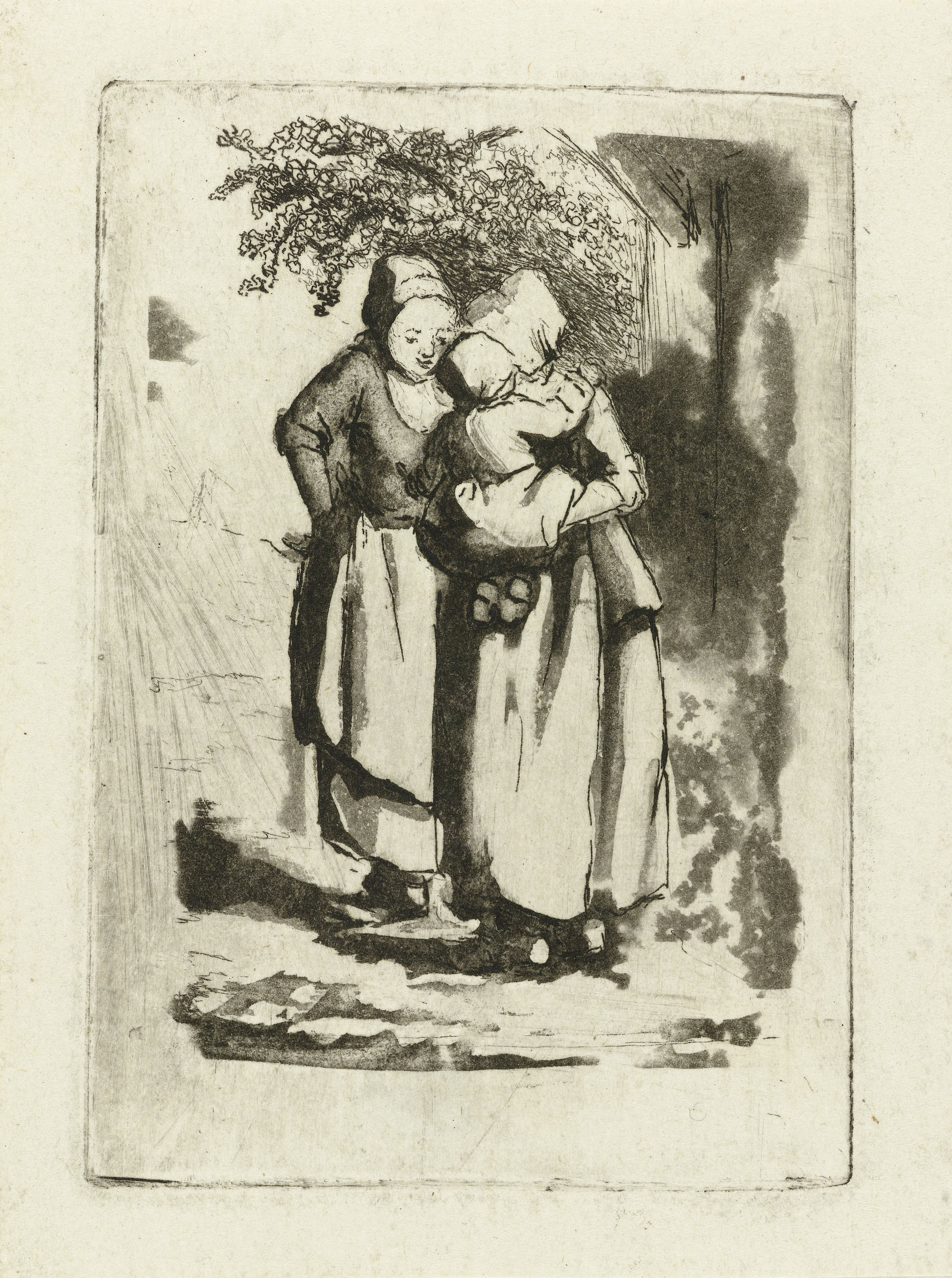
Two standing peasant women, one with a child on her arm
