= Louis Bernard Coclers =

Dutch painter

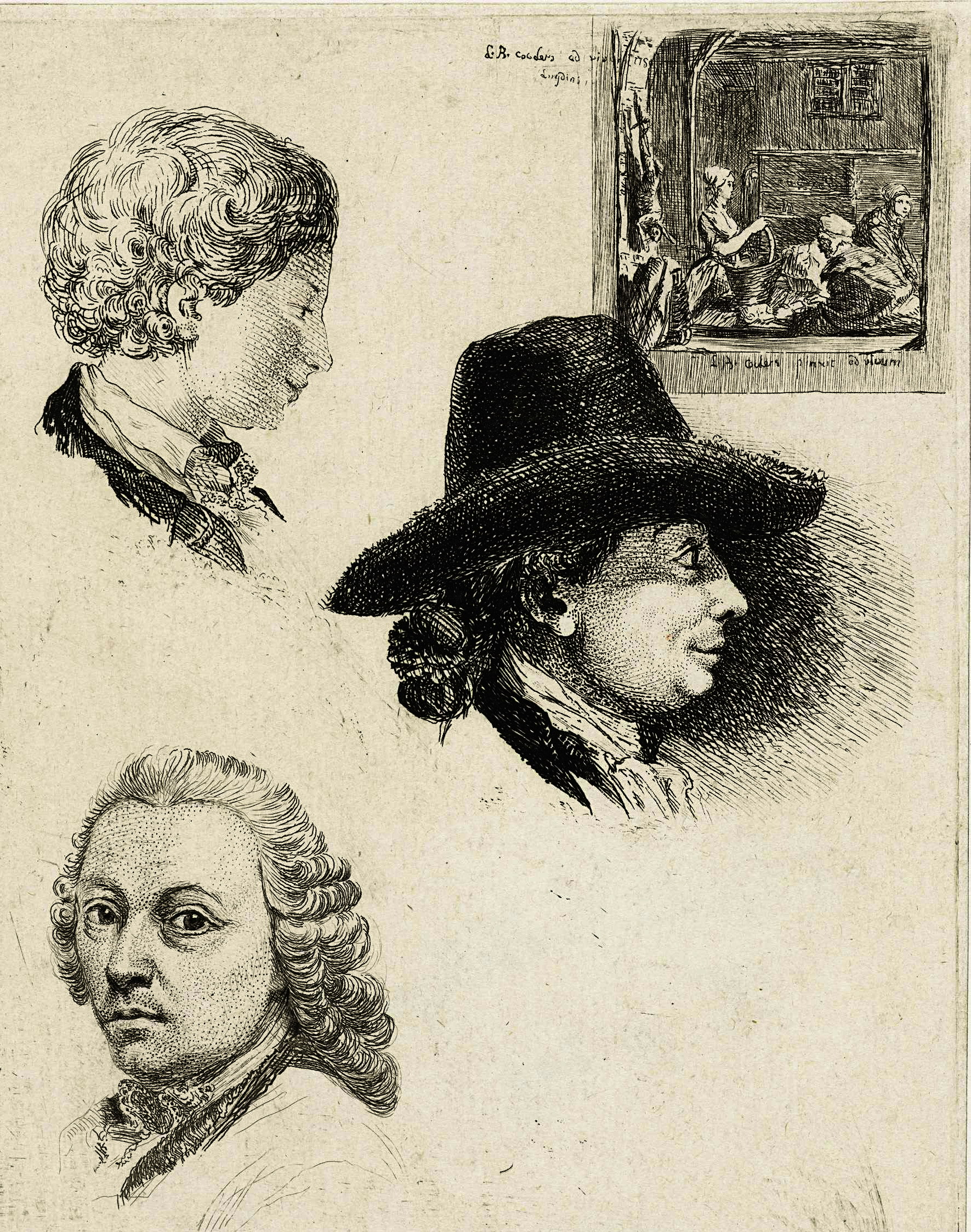
Studies by L.B. Coclers with selfportrait (right) and portraits of his son (upper left) and father, J.-B. Coclers (bottom left)

Louis Bernard Coclers (1740 – 20 April 1817) was a Southern Netherlandish portrait painter and engraver who worked mainly in Liège, Maastricht, Leiden and Amsterdam.

== Life ==
Louis Bernard Coclers was born in Liège or Maastricht in 1740. He was instructed by his father, Jean-Baptiste Coclers. He spent three years in Italy, and after his return he settled in Maastricht, later in Nijmegen, Dordrecht and Leiden (from 1769 onwards).

Compromised politically, he left Holland in 1787, and went to Paris, where he remained several years. He again returned to Holland and resided in Amsterdam, where he painted portraits and engraved cabinet pictures in the manner of Frans van Mieris the Elder, Gabriël Metsu, and Godfried Schalcken, which he exhibited regularly from 1808 to 1813. He engraved 166 plates; they are signed with a cipher, or his initials. One of his paintings and many of his engravings are in the Rijksmuseum Amsterdam.

At the end of his life, Coclers returned to Liège where he died in 1817.

== Works ==
=== Paintings ===
- Portrait of Jan Bernd Bicker, 1776 (Amsterdam Museum)
- Mother and child, 1794 (Rijksmuseum Amsterdam)
- Two portraits of men in harnesses (Bonnefantenmuseum)
- Two portraits of Jacob Hendrik van Suchtelen (Private Collection)

=== Engravings ===
- Malle Babbe, after Frans Hals (Rijksmuseum)
- Mother teaching her son (Rijksmuseum)
- Reading man (Rijksmuseum)
- Old woman preparing beans, 1780 (Rijksmuseum)
- Double-portrait Napoleon and Pope Pius VII, ca. 1805 (Rijksmuseum)
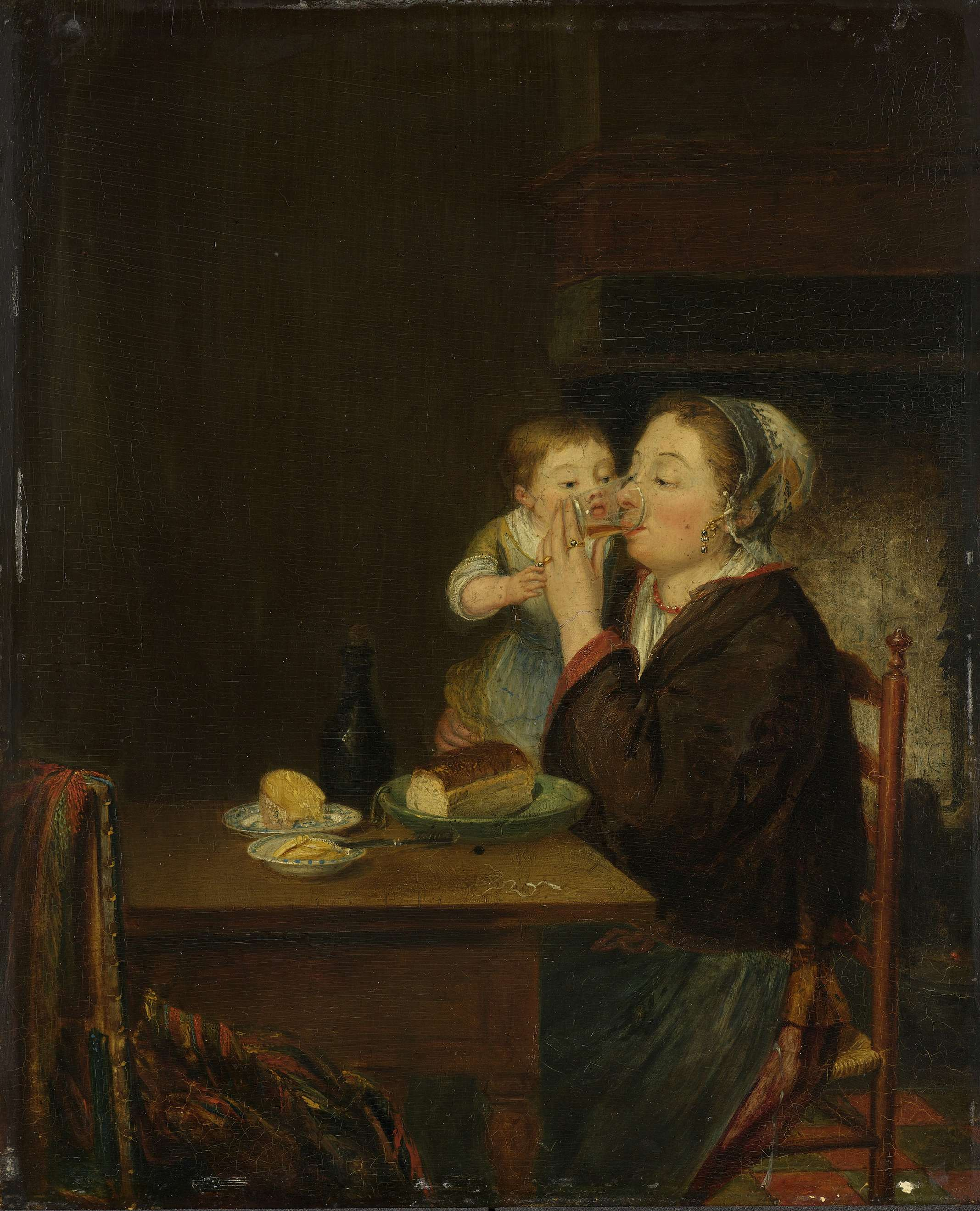
Mother and child

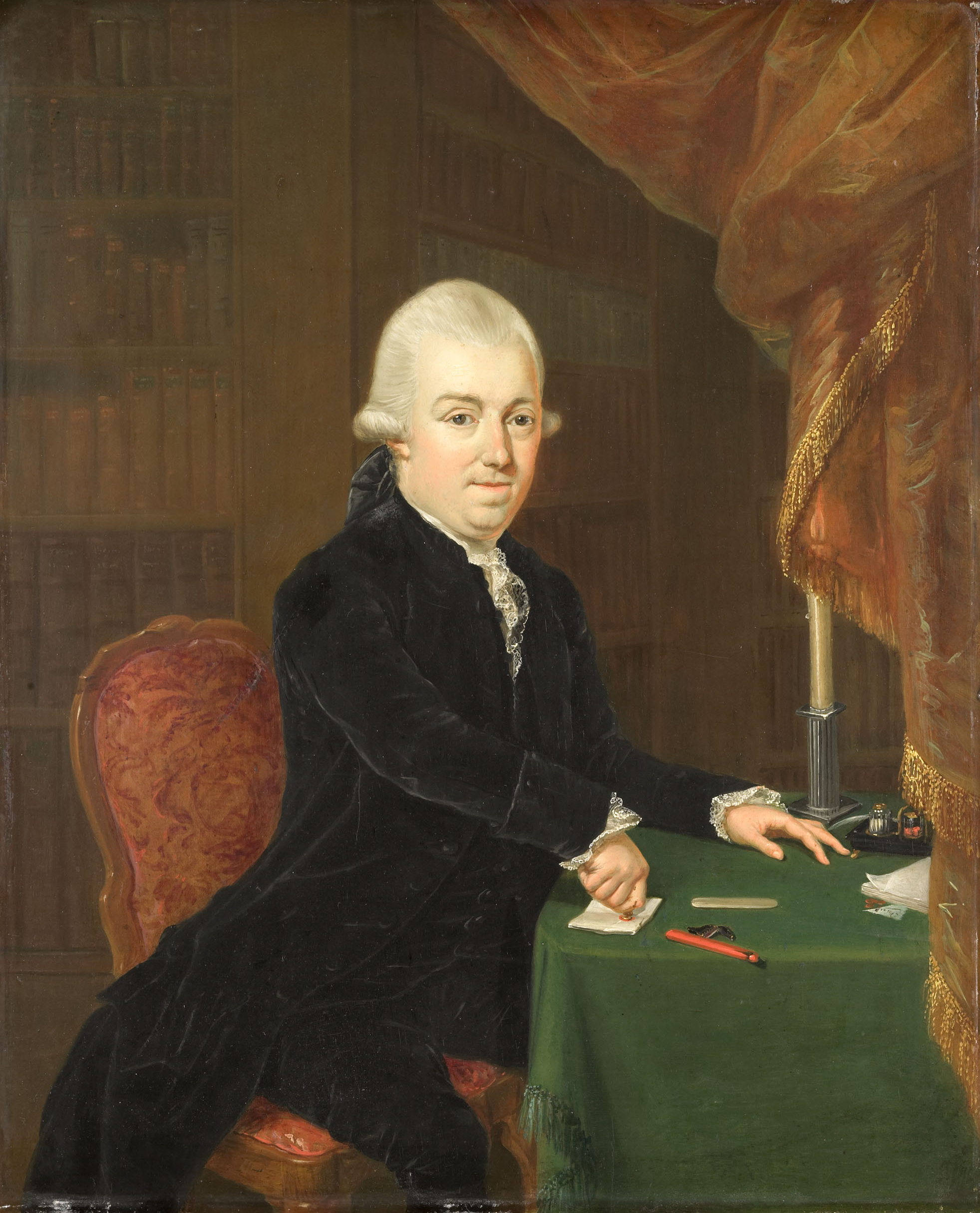
Portrait Jan Bernd Bicker

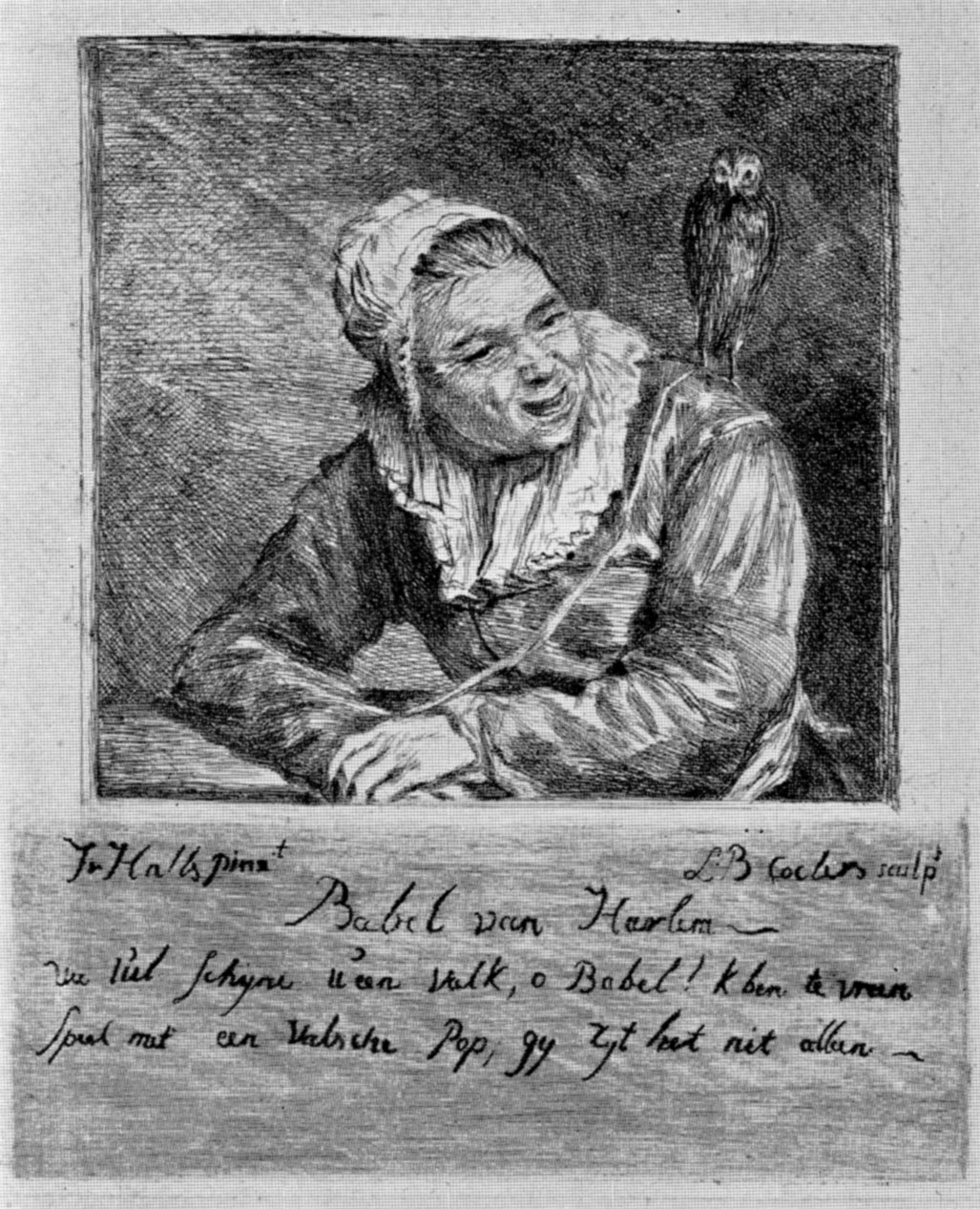
Engraving Malle Babbe

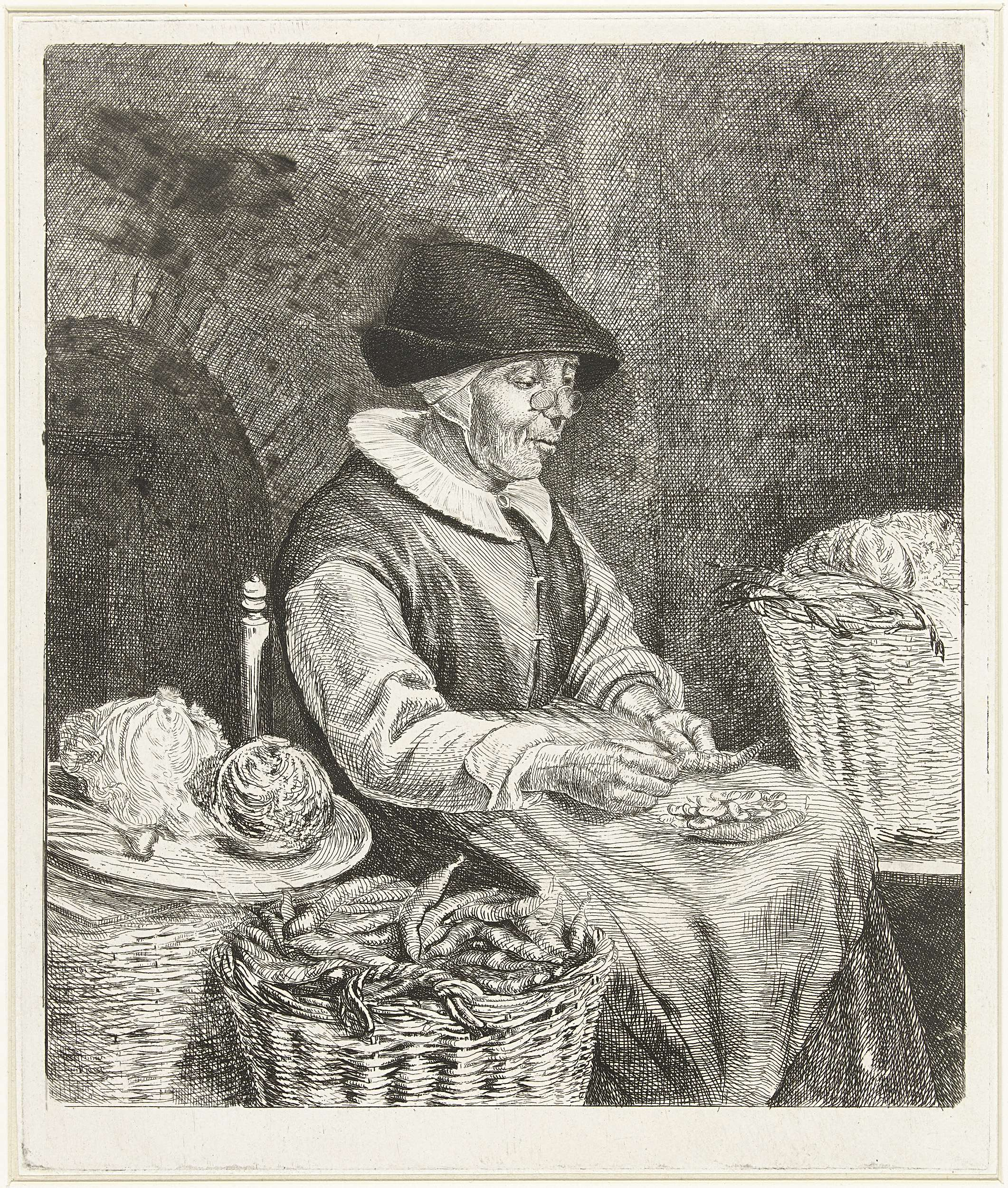
Old woman preparing beans

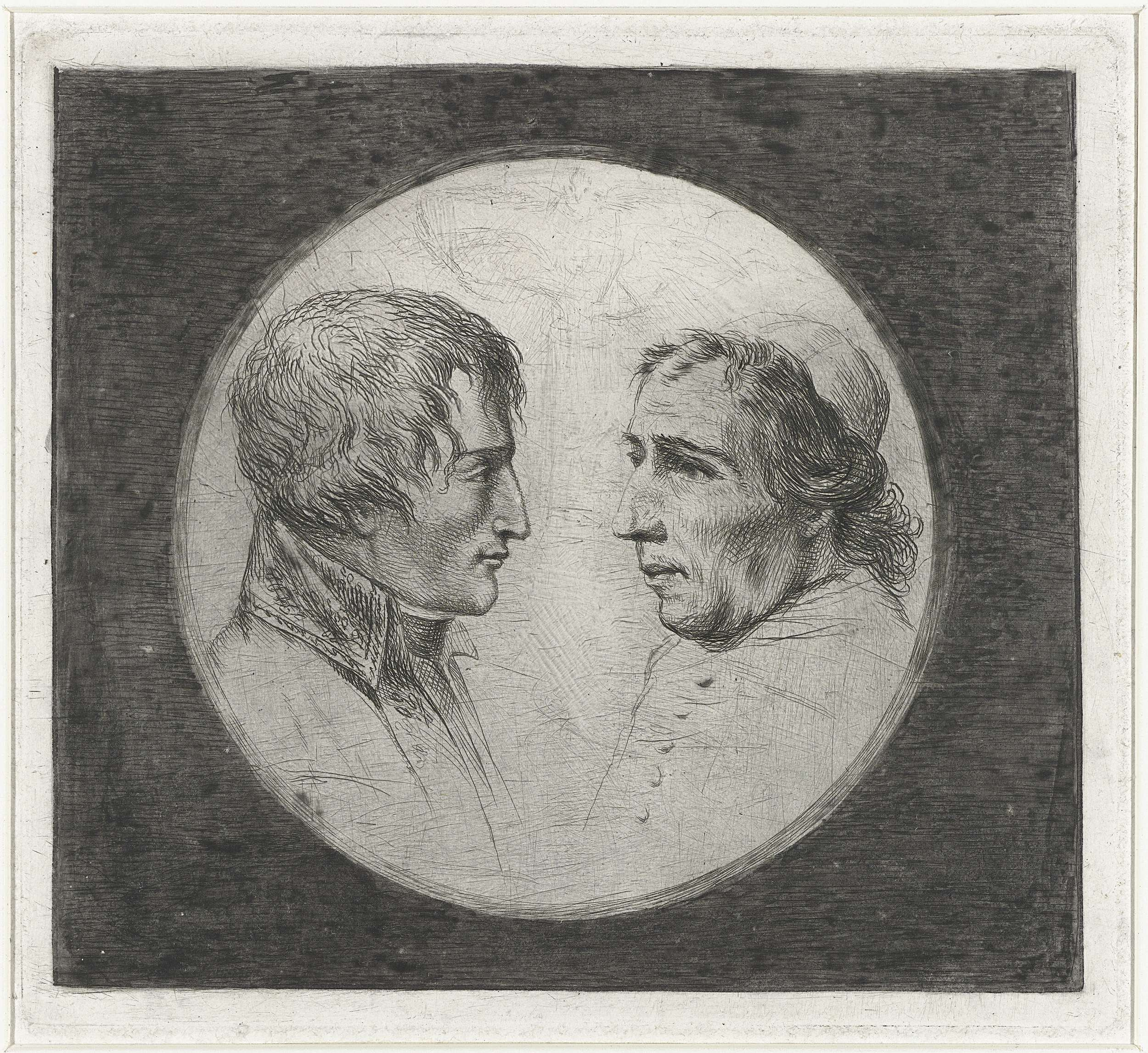
Double portrait Napoleon and Pope Pius VII

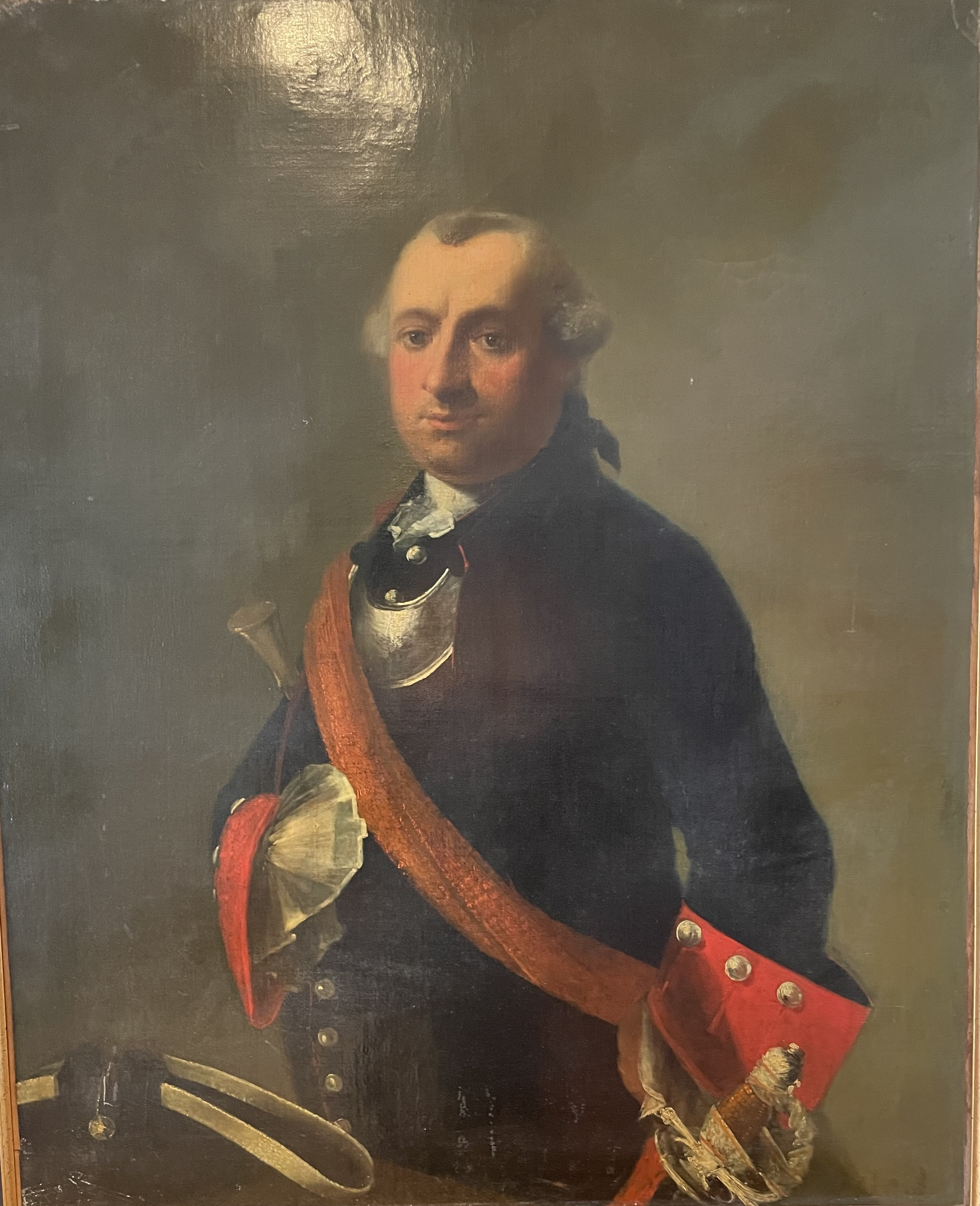
Jakob Hendrich van Suchleten
