= Gerard Bicker (I) van Swieten =

Dutch politician (1632–1716)

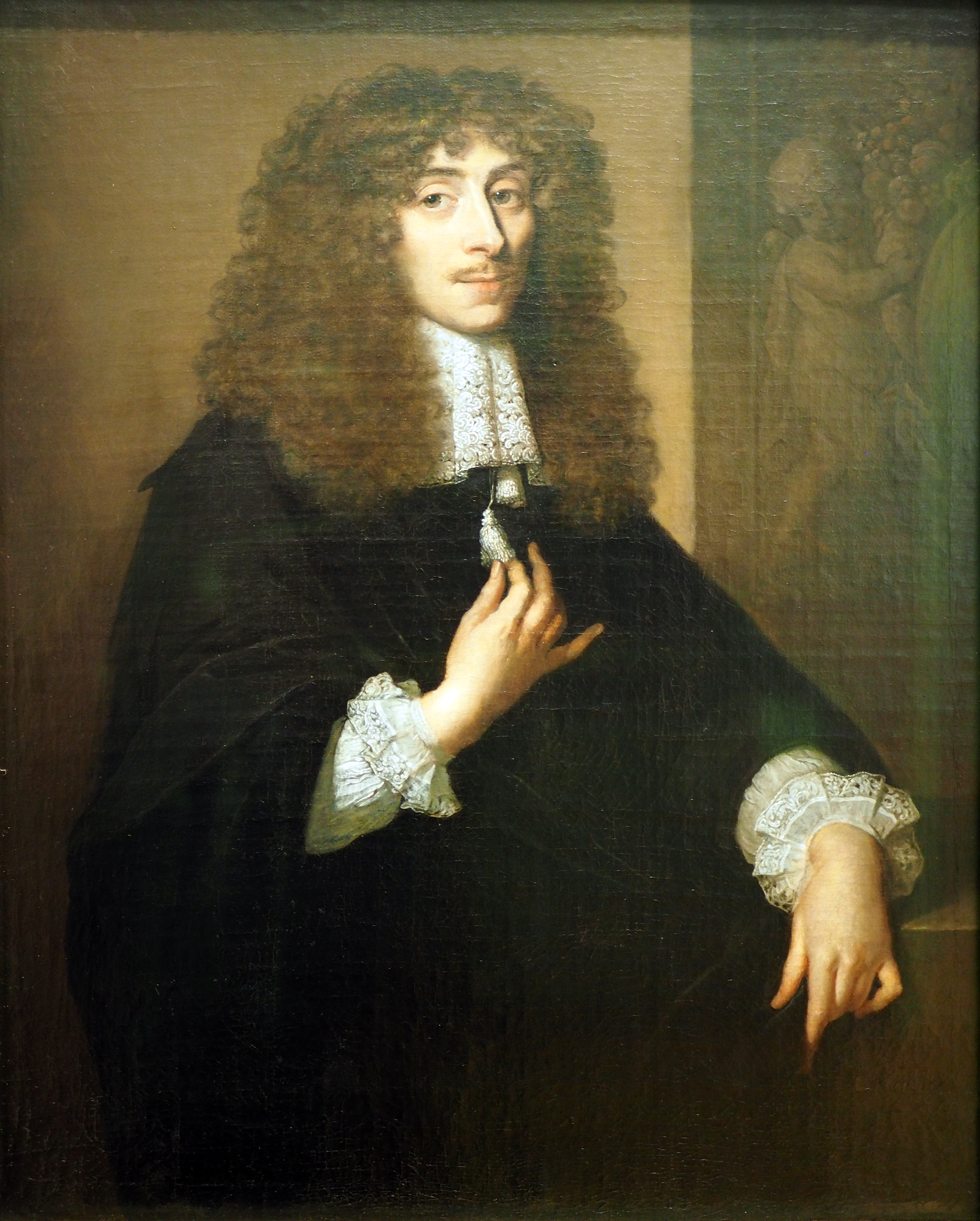
Portrait of Gerrit Bicker van Swieten by Caspar Netscher in 1673, (Landesmuseum Hannover)

Gerard Bicker (I) van Swieten, Lord of Swieten (25 March 1632 – 8 March 1716) was a Dutch aristocrat and civil servant.

== Biography ==
=== Origin ===
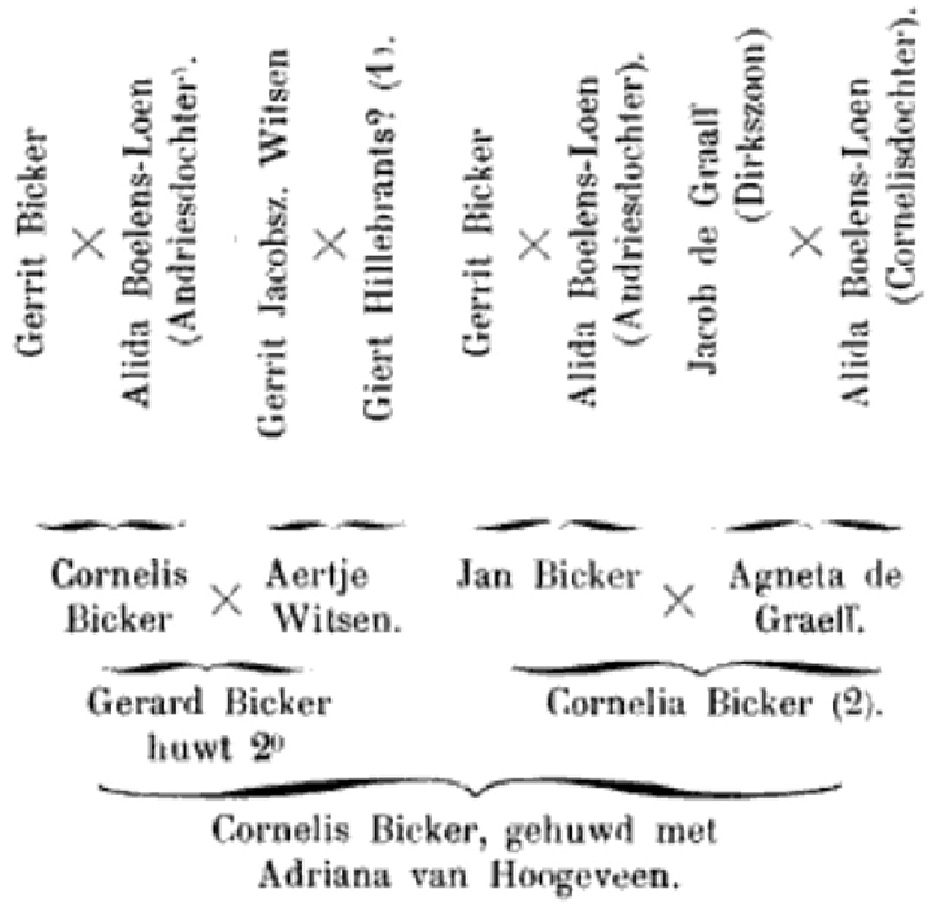
Ancestors and family of Gerard Bicker

Gerard Bicker was born in Amsterdam, a member of the notable Bicker family. His parents were Cornelis Bicker and Aertge Witsen. In 1660 he inherited the Swieten estate from his father and henceforth bore the name Bicker van Swieten. He had four sisters, three of whom were married to Amsterdam mayors; Margaretha ⚭ in second marriage to Cornelis Geelvinck, Alida ⚭ to Lambert Reynst and Elisabeth ⚭ to her uncle and 2nd cousin Andries de Graeff. His other close relatives were his brothers-in-law (through her 2nd marriage with her full cousin Cornelia Bicker in 1658) Grand pensionary Johan de Witt (through his marriage to Cornelia's sister Wendela Bicker), Pieter de Graeff, who was already his multiple cousin before (through his marriage to Cornelia's sister Jacoba), Jean Deutz (through his marriage to Cornelia's sister Geertruid) and Jacob Trip (through his marriage to Cornelia's sister Elisabeth). His brothers-in-law where important and loyal political allies to Grand pensionary De Witt. Through another cousin of him, Cornelia Bicker (1629–1708), he was also related to Joachim Irgens von Westervick, politician and with his Irgens Estate Norway's largest private landowner. He had another connection with Jacob de Petersen, a former Danish dignitary, who was married to Catharina Bicker (1642-1678), daughter of knight Jacob Bicker (1612-1676) and Alida Bicker (a daughter of Gerard's uncle Andries Bicker).

=== Marriages and descendants ===
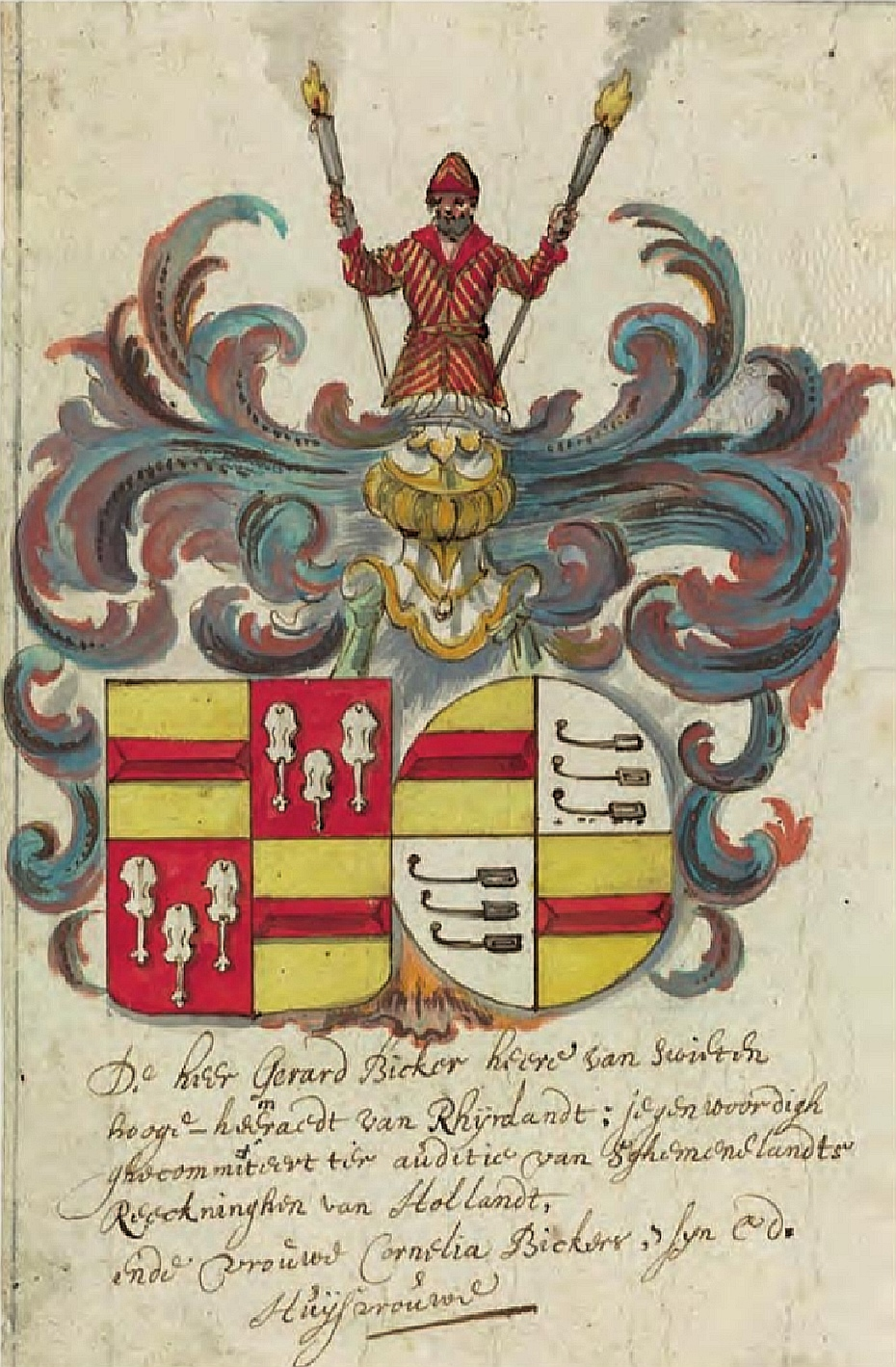
Alliance crest Gerard Bicker van Swieten and Cornelia Bicker

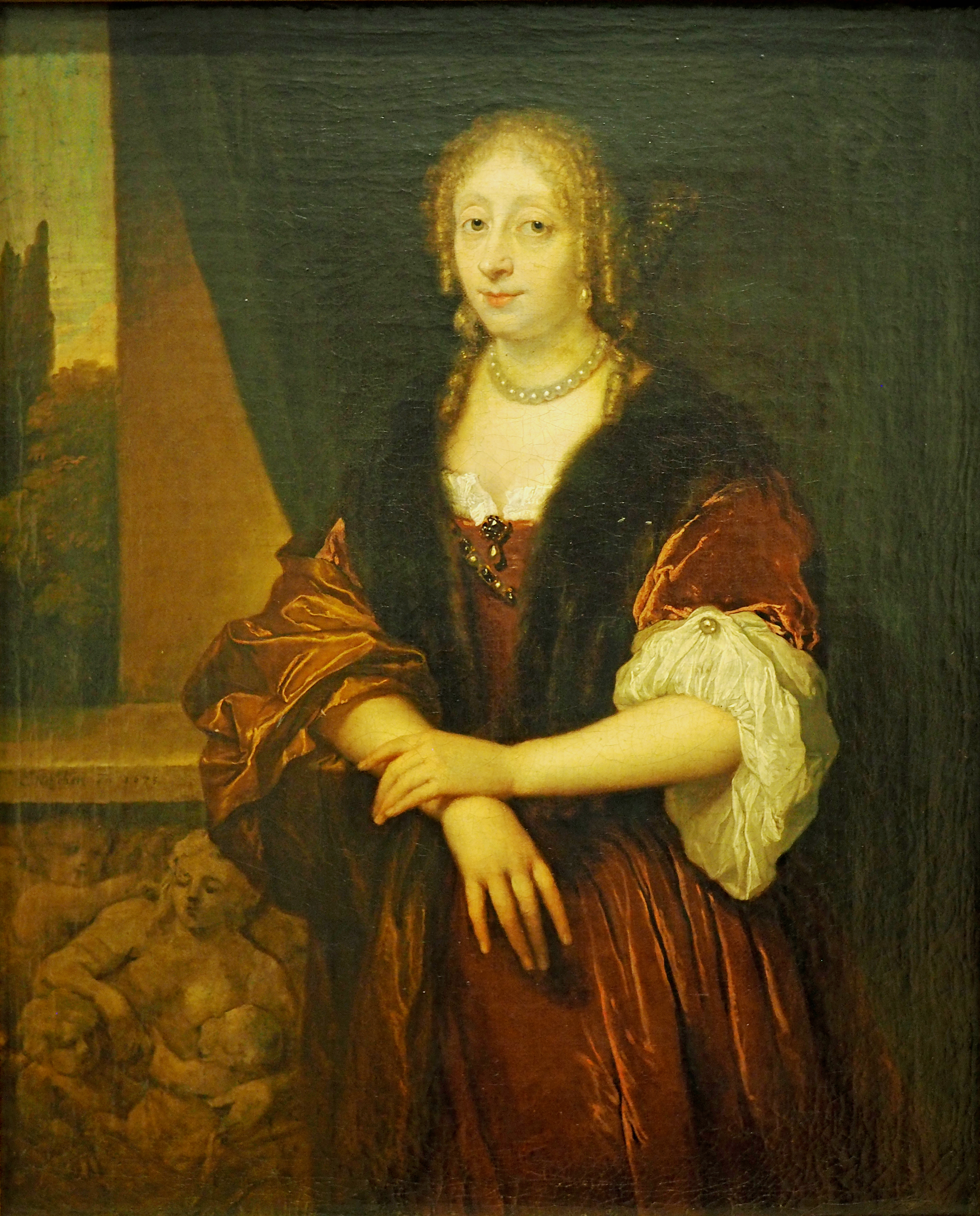
Cornelia Bicker, painted by Caspar Netscher in 1673 (Landesmuseum Hannover)

Bicker has been married three times. In 1655 he married his first wife Alida van Papenbroek (1633–1656), daughter of Pieter van Papenbroek and his cousin Wendela de Graeff. This marriage remained childless, but Bicker inherited the Vrijheerlijkheiden (Free Lordships) Oud-Haarlem and Kortenbosch through this marriage. After the death of Alida, in 1658 he married his cousin Cornelia Bicker (1638–1665), a daughter of Jan Bicker (1591–1653) and his cousin Agneta de Graeff van Polsbroek (1603–1656). Agnieta (* 1659), Aertgen (* 1661) and Cornelis Bicker van Swieten (1663-1689) came from his marriage. After the death of his second wife, he remarried with Jonkvrouw Catherina van Sijpesteijn for the third time in 1665, but they had no further children. Bicker van Swieten's marriages, and here his first two, continued the frequent relationship to one and the same person that already existed within the Bicker-De Graeff clan and their related families in an intensive way through kinship marriages.

=== Career ===
Gerard Bicker van Swieten became commissioner in 1656 and captain of the Amsterdam schutterij (Citizen Guard) in 1662. After that he was deputy and councilor as well as presidential council of the Court of Auditors of Holland and West-Friesland (Dutch: Rekenkamer van Holland en West-Friesland) in The Hague. In 1669, through the intercession of De Witt, he obtained the position of Statutory auditor of the Court of Audit of the domains of Holland and West-Friesland (Dutch: Rekenmeester der Grafelijke domeinen van Holland en West-Friesland / Meester ordinaris van de Rekenkamer van Holland en West-Friesland). He was also Meesterknaap van Holland en West-Friesland, and 1664 Hoogheemraad of Rijnland. In The Hague, the Bicker family lived in De Witt's house on the Hofsingel, while De Witt himself lived in the outbuilding. They looked after De Witt's children, including Johan de Witt Jr., whose mother, Wendela Bicker, had died young.

In 1675 Gerard Bicker, his uncle Andries de Graeff and his brother-in-law and cousin Pieter de Graeff acquired the country estate of Valckenburg (the former Valckeveen of his great-uncle Dirck Jansz Graeff) near Heemstede for 7,480 guilders in equal parts from his aunt Christina de Graeff (1609–1679). From 1685 Pieter de Graeff was the sole owner. He died in Leiderdorp.

== Literature ==
- Johan Engelbert Elias: 'De Vroedschap van Amsterdam, 1578-1795', pages 175 /176 (1963) Online-Version
- Matthias Laurenz Gräff: 'Cornelis Bicker van Swieten (1592-1654). Patriziatische Macht und Ohnmacht im Goldenen Zeitalter der Niederlande' [see pages 15-18] (2026) Online version
