= Johan de Witt =

Dutch statesman (1625–1672)

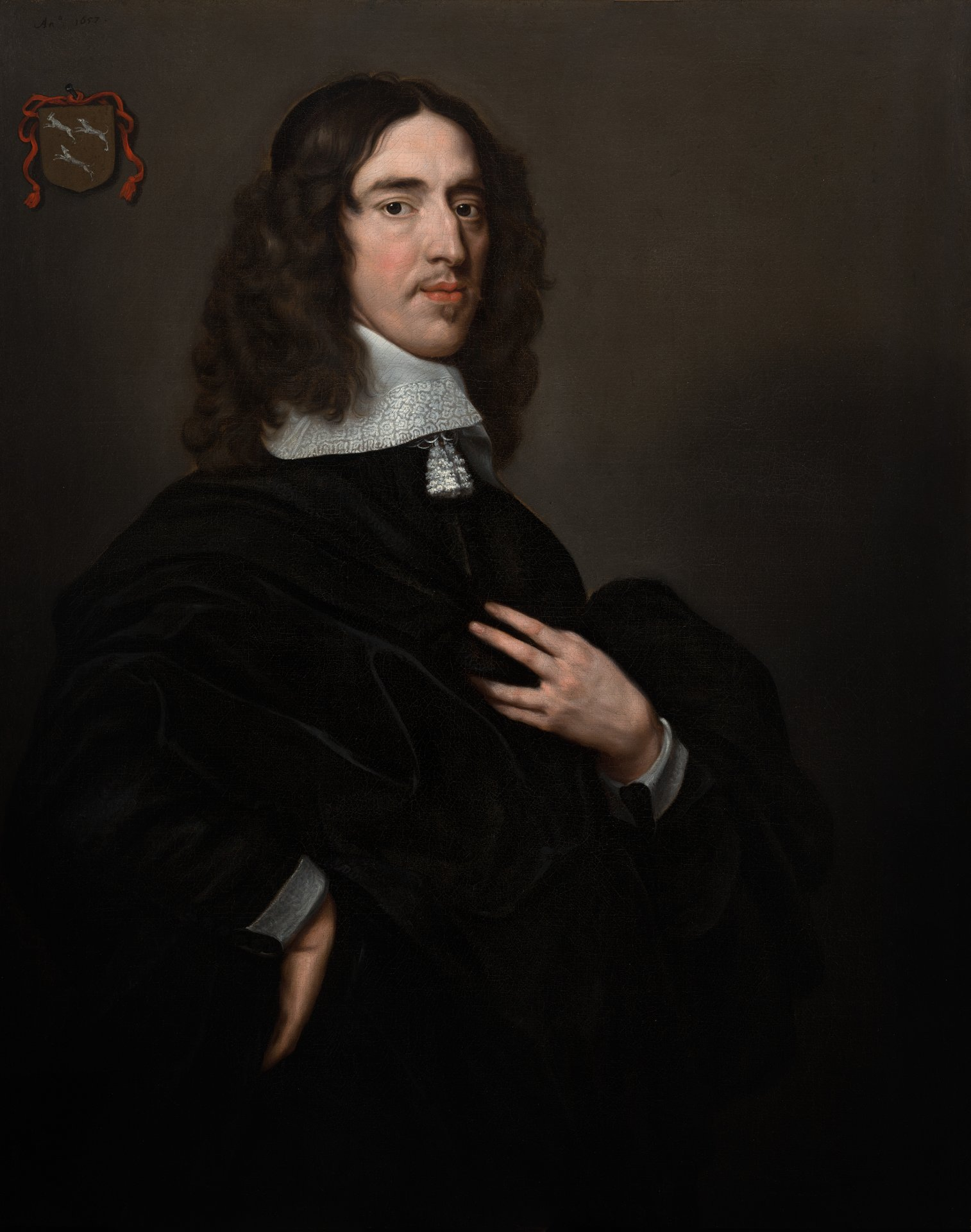
- Portrait by Adriaen Hanneman, 1665

Grand Pensionary of Holland
- In office 30 July 1653 – 4 August 1672
- Preceded by: Adriaan Pauw
- Succeeded by: Gaspar Fagel

Pensionary of Dordrecht
- In office 21 December 1650 – 30 July 1653
- Preceded by: Nicolaas Ruys
- Succeeded by: Govert van Slingelandt

Personal details
- Born: 24 September 1625 Dordrecht, Dutch Republic
- Died: 20 August 1672 (aged 46) The Hague, Dutch Republic
- Party: States' Party
- Spouse: Wendela Bicker (m. 1656)
- Children: Johan de Witt Jr.
- Parent: Jacob de Witt (father)
- Relatives: Cornelis de Witt (brother); Jan Bicker (father-in-law); Andries de Witt (uncle); Cornelis de Graeff (uncle); Andries de Graeff (uncle); Catharina Hooft (aunt); Jean Deutz (brother-in-law); Pieter de Graeff (brother-in-law)
- Education: University of Leiden; University of Angers

Johan de Witt (24 September 1625 – 20 August 1672) was a Dutch statesman and mathematician who was a major political figure during the First Stadtholderless Period, when flourishing global trade in a period of rapid European colonial expansion made the Dutch a leading trading and seafaring power in Europe, commonly referred to as the Dutch Golden Age. De Witt was elected Grand Pensionary of Holland, and together with his uncle Cornelis de Graeff, he controlled the Dutch political system from around 1650 until the Rampjaar (Disaster Year) of 1672. This progressive cooperation between the two statesmen, and the consequent support of Amsterdam under the rule of De Graeff, was an important political axis that organized the political system within the republic.

As a leading republican of the Dutch States Party, De Witt opposed the House of Orange-Nassau and the Orangists and preferred a shift of power from the central government to the regenten. However, the Dutch Republic suffered numerous early defeats in the Rampjaar, due to an alliance of England, France, and several German states which planned on invading the Dutch Republic. In the hysteria that followed, he and his older brother Cornelis de Witt were blamed and lynched in The Hague, with their corpses at least partially eaten by the rioters. These cannibals were never prosecuted, and some historians claim William of Orange may have incited them.

== Family and early life ==
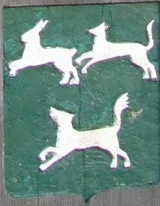
Family coat of arms

Johan de Witt was a member of the old Dutch De Witt family. His father was Jacob de Witt, an influential regent from the patrician class in the city of Dordrecht, which in the 17th century was one of the most important cities of the dominating province of Holland. De Witt's mother was Anna van den Corput (1599–1645), niece of Johannes Corputius, an influential Dutch military leader and cartographer. Johan's brother Cornelis had a steep career in the shadow of the former. His uncle Andries de Witt held the position of Grand Pensionary of Holland between 1619 and 1621. Through the marriage of one of his other uncles to Margaretha of Nassau, daughter of Anna Johanna of Nassau-Siegen, De Witt was a distant relative of William of Orange-Nassau. Another relationship connected him to the Tromps, Maarten and his son Cornelis Tromp, both admirals of the Netherlands.

Johan and his older brother Cornelis grew up in a privileged environment in terms of education, his father having as good acquaintances important scholars and scientists, such as Isaac Beeckman, Jacob Cats, Gerardus Vossius, and Andreas Colvius. Johan and Cornelis both attended the Latin school in Dordrecht, which imbued them with the values of the Roman Republic. After attending the Latin school in Dordrecht, Johan de Witt studied at the Leiden University, where he excelled at mathematics and law. He received his doctorate from the University of Angers in 1645. He practised law in The Hague as an associate with the firm of Frans van Schooten.

== Marriage and children ==
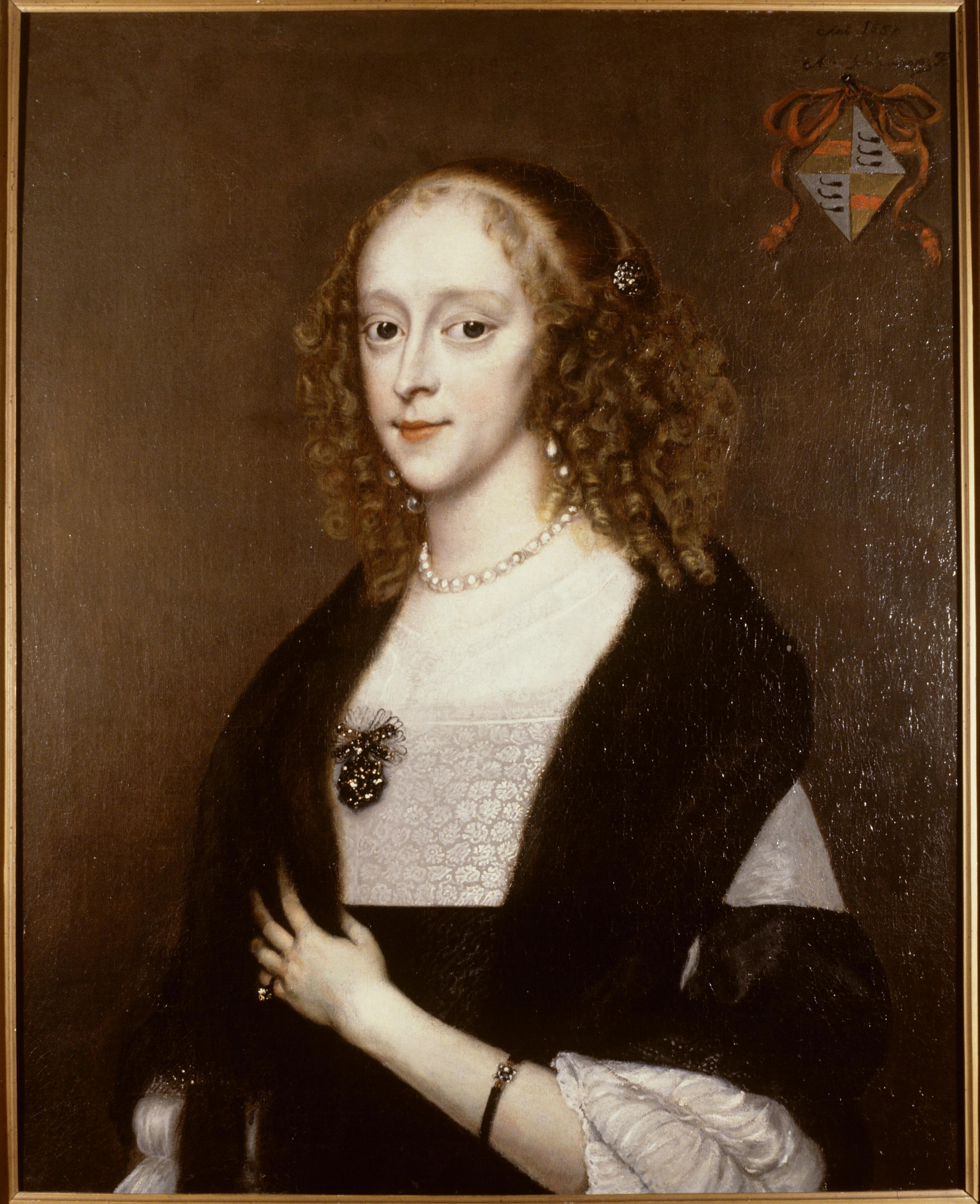
Wendela Bicker

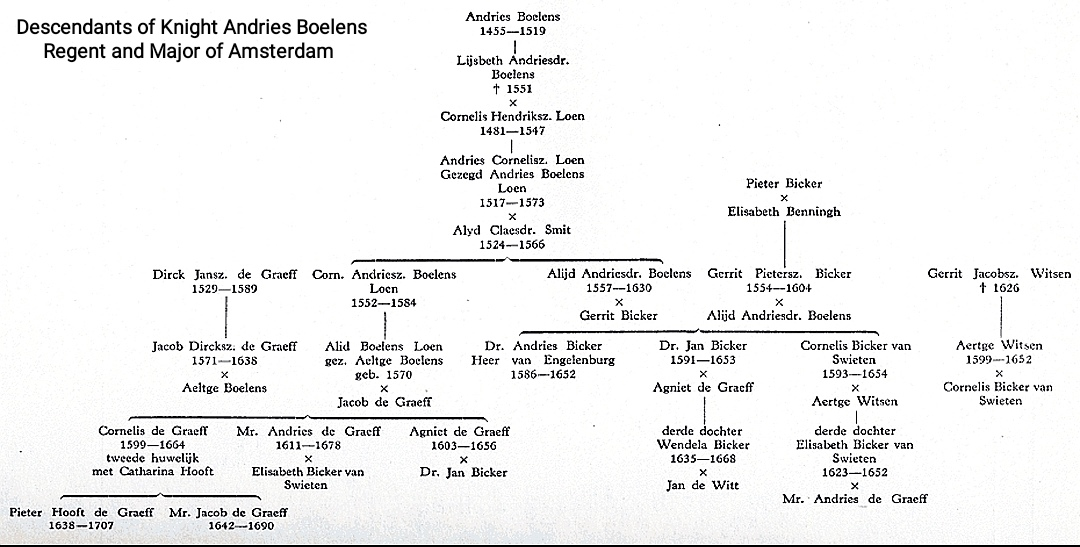
Overview of the personal family relationships of the Amsterdam oligarchy between the regent-dynasties Boelens Loen, De Graeff, Bicker (van Swieten), Witsen and Johan de Witt in the Dutch Golden Age

In 1655 Johan de Witt married Wendela Bicker, daughter of Johan Bicker and Agneta de Graeff van Polsbroek, who belonged to the inner circle of the powerful Amsterdam oligarchy. Through his marriage, De Witt became a relative of the ruling patrician families Bicker, De Graeff, Hooft, Witsen, Boelens Loen, and Reynst among others. His brothers-in-law also included Amsterdam patrician Pieter de Graeff (who was also his full cousin), high official Gerard Bicker (I) van Swieten, arms dealer Jacob Trip and banker and financier Jean Deutz, all important and loyal political allies of De Witt. Frans Banninck Cocq (captain of Rembrandt's famous painting The Night Watch) became his uncle-in-law and Joachim Irgens von Westervick (between 1666 and 1675 owner of the private Irgens Estate, which was a huge part of Northern Norway) his cousin-in-law as well. Johan and Wendela had four children, three daughters and one son:

1. Anna de Witt (1655–1725), married to Herman van den Honert
2. Agnes de Witt (1658–1688), married to Simon Teresteyn van Halewijn
3. Maria de Witt (1660–1689), married to Willem Hooft
4. Johan de Witt Jr. (1662–1701), secretary of the city of Dordrecht; married to Wilhelmina de Witt, the daughter of his uncle Cornelis de Witt

After De Witt's death, Pieter de Graeff, husband of his wife Wendela's younger sister Jacoba Bicker, became the guardian of his children.

== Politics ==
In 1650 (the year that stadtholder William II, Prince of Orange died) he was appointed leader of the deputation of Dordrecht to the States of Holland and West Friesland. In December 1650, De Witt became the pensionary of Dordrecht as the successor of Nicolaas Ruys. In 1652, at the age of 27, De Witt was faced with a mob of angry demonstrators of sailors and fishermen in the city of Vlissingen. He held this position until July 1653 and was succeeded by Govert van Slingelandt, a distant relative of his.

=== Elected Grand Pensionary ===
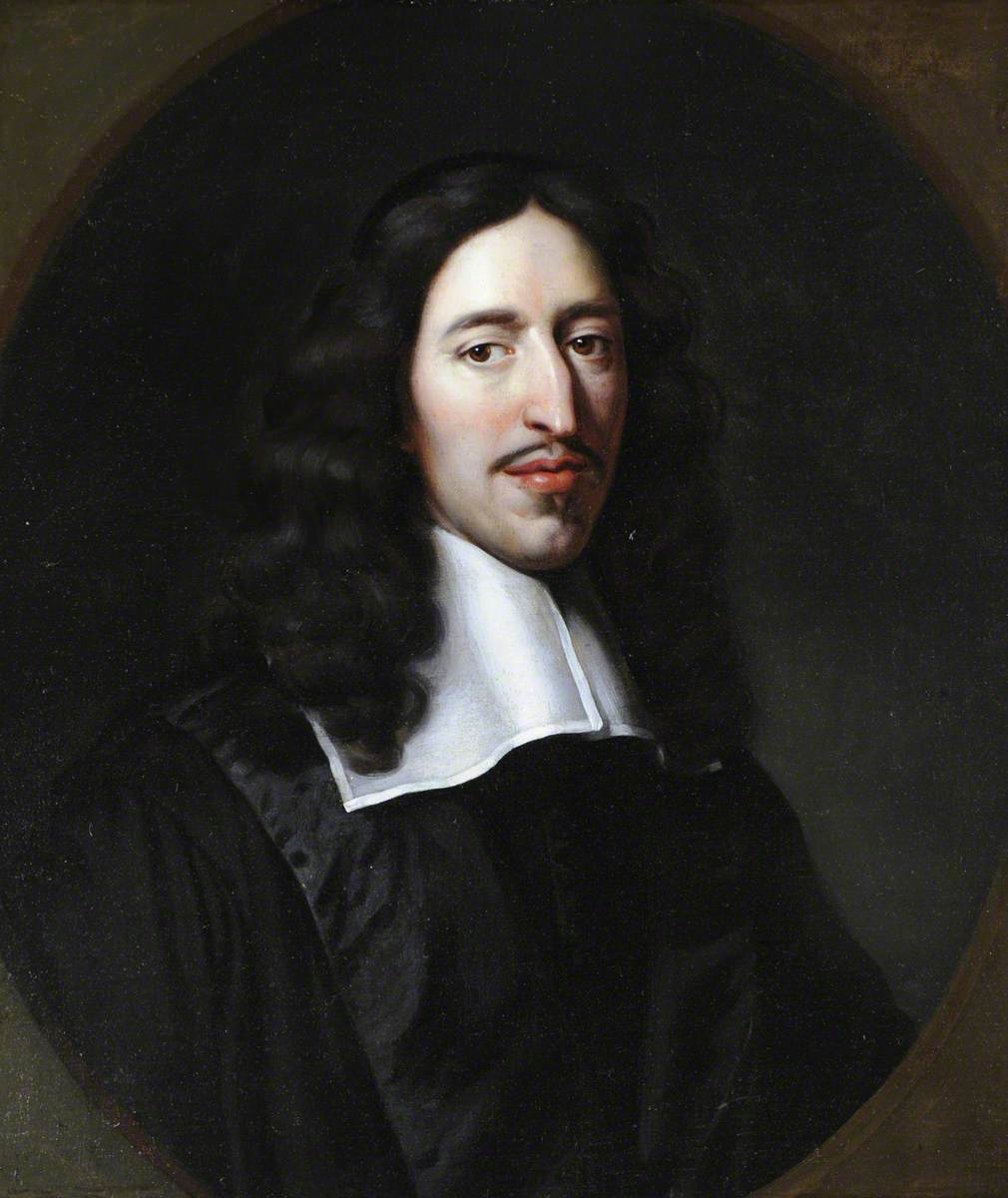
Portrait of Johan de Witt (after Jan de Baen)

In July 1653, the States of Holland elected De Witt Grand Pensionary. In making the appointment, De Witt relied on the express consent of Amsterdam headed by burgomaster and regent Cornelis de Graeff. The States of Holland chose him with the express intercession of his later uncle De Graeff. Since Holland was the Republic's most powerful province, he was effectively the political leader of the United Provinces as a whole – , especially during periods when no stadholder had been elected by the States of most Provinces. The raadpensionaris of Holland was often referred to as the Grand Pensionary by foreigners as he represented the preponderant province in the Union of the Dutch Republic. He led the States of the province by his experience, tenure, familiarity with the issues, and use of the staff at his disposal. He was in no manner equivalent to a modern Prime Minister.

Representing the province of Holland, De Witt tended to identify with the economic interests of shipping and trading in the United Provinces. These interests were largely concentrated in the province of Holland, and to a lesser degree in the province of Zeeland.

==== Political goals ====
As leader of the state-oriented party, Johan de Witt pursued the interests of the Dutch patricians and merchants. He had his most important goals formulated in 1662 by his like-minded Pieter de la Court in the book The Interest of Holland. They were:

1. Peaceful foreign policy, since every war weighed on the economy. De la Court went so far as to suggest replacing the lion in the Dutch coat of arms with a cat.
2. Greatest possible autonomy for Holland and distance from the other six provinces, since these were a burden on rich Holland. De la Court suggested digging a huge ditch to mark the separation, but this was meant to be satirical.
3. Permanent disempowerment of the Princes of Orange, since their dynastic ambitions ran counter to the sober interests of the merchants.

==== Relationship with Cornelis de Graeff ====
At the height of the Dutch Golden Age, the First Stadtholderless Period from 1650 to 1672, political power within Holland rested primarily with two pro-state minded, republican, families. At Amsterdam, this lay with the brothers Cornelis and Andries de Graeff, and at The Hague with the brothers Johan and Cornelis de Witt, leaders of the pro-state (republican) faction of Holland, reinforced by their close collaboration and mutual kinship.

Domestically, Johan de Witt relied on political cooperation with the Dutch cities, and above all with Amsterdam. In doing so, De Witt recognized the political power of his uncle burgomaster Cornelis de Graeff, and did his best to accommodate Amsterdam's wishes. De Witt needed his political advice, the support of the Amsterdam government under De Graeff and his clientele, but he also enjoyed his clear mind and humane frankness. De Graeff combined a clear mind, extensive education and the ability to give and take. In one respect, however, he differed from his uncle, for although De Witt was a supporter of liberty like him, in contrast to him he clung to the extreme, which was to prove to be a fatal error in the Rampjaar 1672. The relationship between these two distinct characters was a combination of close kinship and mutual respect. De Graeff was a political equal to De Witt like no other. From then on, De Graeff was at his side as an experienced and trusted councilman. De Witt's letters to De Graeff testify to the great trust that the nephew had in his uncle in political and family matters (a short exchange of letters from the year 1660 bears witness to this). That did not rule out a fight between the two. Nevertheless, the relationship remained excellent. De Witt understood the remark of Cornelis de Vlaming van Oudshoorn, another Amsterdam burgomaster, dat zonder den heer van Zuidpolsbroek [De Graeff] in niets iets te doen was (that without the Lord of Zuid-Polsbroek nothing could be done anywhere).

=== Leading statesman ===
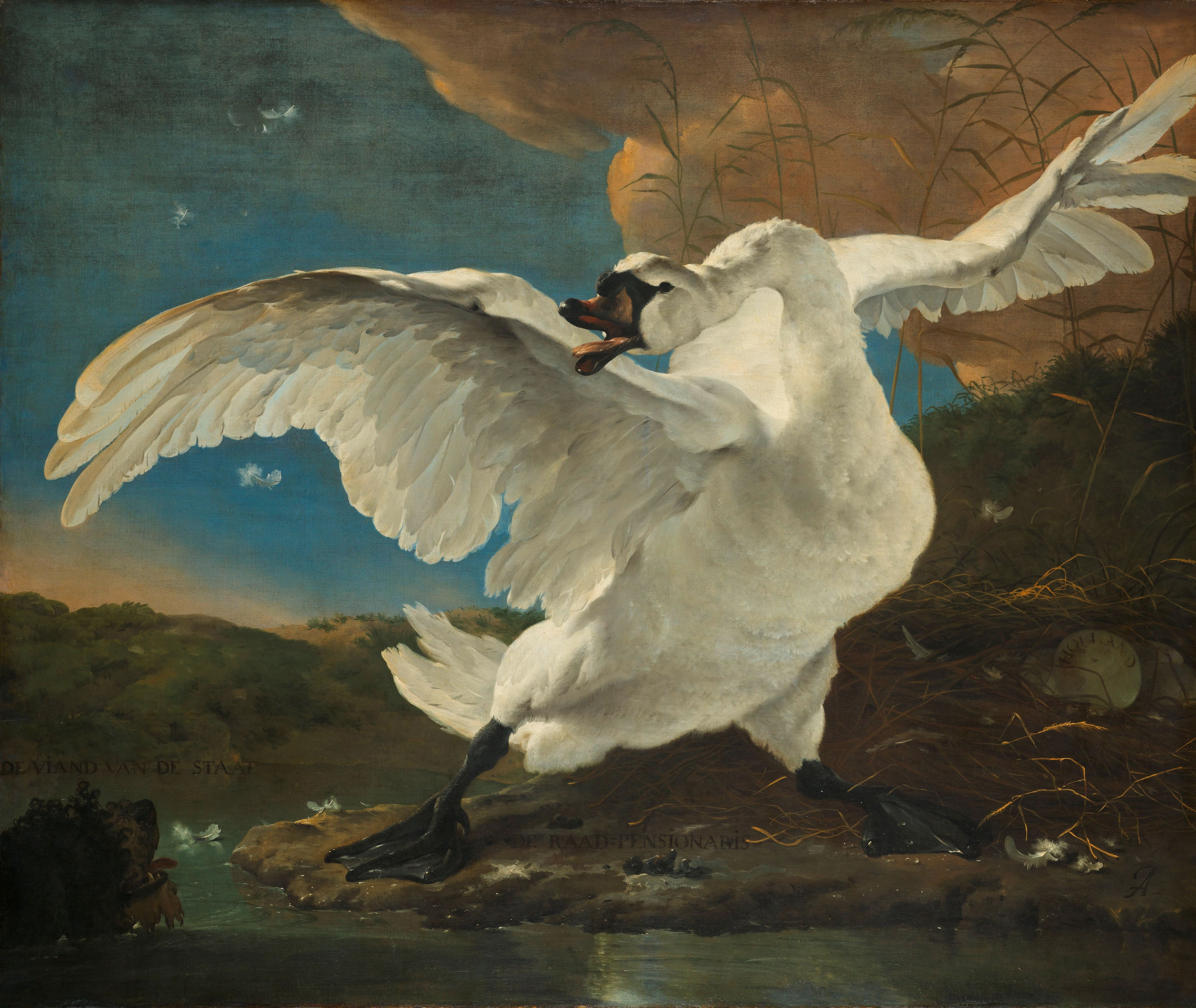
The Threatened Swan by Jan Asselijn is an allegory of De Witt protecting his country from its enemies

De Witt's power base was the wealthy merchant and patrician class into which he was born. This class broadly coincided politically with the "States faction", stressing Protestant religious moderation and pragmatic foreign policy defending commercial interests. The "Orange faction", consisting of the middle class, preferred a strong leader from the Dutch House of Orange as a counterweight against the rich upper-classes in economic and religious matters. Although leaders that did emerge from the House of Orange rarely were strict Calvinists themselves, they tended to identify with Calvinism, which was popular among the middle classes in the United Provinces during this time. William II of Orange was a prime example of this tendency among the leaders of the House of Orange to support Calvinism. William II was elected stadholder in 1647 and continued to serve until his death in November 1650. Eight days after his death, William II's wife delivered a male heir, William of Orange. Many citizens of the United Provinces urged the election of the infant William III as a stadholder under a regency until he came of age. However, the Provinces, under the dominance of the province of Holland did not fill the office of stadholder.

When Johan de Witt became de facto leader of the Dutch Republic in 1653, the state was at war with England. The superior English navy blockaded Dutch ports, which triggered a severe economic crisis. De Witt's priority was therefore a speedy peace agreement with England. The Lord Protector of England, Oliver Cromwell, demanded as a condition that the House of Orange should be permanently excluded from power in the Dutch Republic. Cromwell's motive was that the house supported his opponents, the House of Stuart. De Witt knew that the other six Dutch provinces would not agree to such a dictate. But that changed the exemplary collaboration between De Witt and his influential later uncle Cornelis de Graeff, which was an important factor in the success of De Witt's policies and the revival of economic progress after the First Anglo-Dutch War. Together with his De Graeff, De Witt brought about peace with England with the Treaty of Westminster in May 1654. As a result of the positive course of the war for the Netherlands, the Dutch leadership around De Witt, De Graeff, the army commander Johann Wolfart van Brederode and Lieutenant Admiral Jacob van Wassenaer Obdam urged the Dutch States General to position themselves as a whole behind the secret Act of Seclusion, which would exclude the young William III from the office of stadtholder. This resolution was drafted by De Graeff in collaboration with De Witt and diplomat Hieronymus van Beverningh.

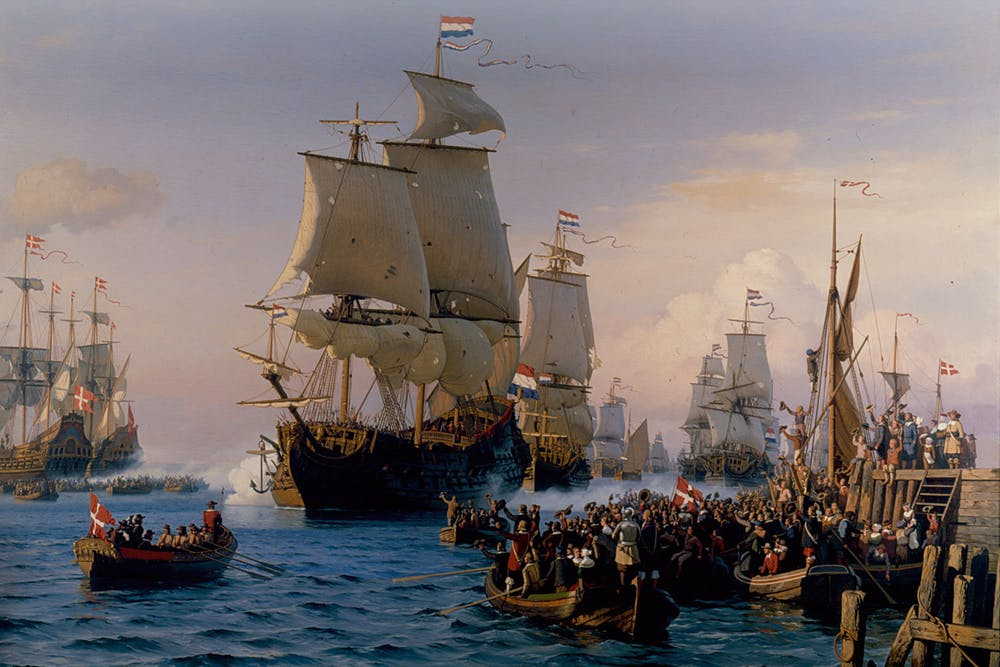
The Dutch fleet relieves Copenhagen after the Battle of the Sound

In the period following the Treaty of Westminster, the Republic grew in wealth and influence under De Witt's leadership. In the years that followed, he consistently pursued the commercial interests of his country. In 1658/59 he sent large naval forces to the Baltic Sea to support Denmark against Sweden in the Second Northern War and to ensure free passage for Dutch merchant ships through the Øresund. De Witt created a strong Dutch States Navy, appointing one of his political allies, Lieutenant Admiral Van Wassenaer Obdam, as supreme commander of the Confederate fleet. In these turbulent times of the first governorless period, his trusted councilman, Coenraad van Beuningen, had been a great support to him. One of his brothers-in-law, Jean Deutz, was a trusted advisor on economic matters and financed the wars of the republic under his brother-in-law De Witt.

Despite all these quick political successes, De Witt always presented himself to the outside world as a humble civil servant who walked the streets of The Hague without an escort and with only one servant. According to the English ambassador Sir William Temple, he was outwardly "indistinguishable from the common man". He himself always emphasized that he had "no decisive vote, authority or power" in the Assembly of States of Holland. But the French ambassador reported to Paris that power in the Netherlands rested with "Monsieur de Witt".

In 1657, De Witt and De Graeff mediated the "Treaty of Raalte", in which William III passed the stadholdership of Overijssel.

On 25 September 1660, the States of Holland under the prime movers of De Witt, De Graeff, his younger brother Andries de Graeff, along with Gillis Valckenier, resolved to take charge of William's education to ensure he would acquire the skills to serve in a future – although undetermined – state function. Influenced by the values of the Roman republic, De Witt did his utmost anyway to prevent any member of the House of Orange from gaining power, convincing many provinces to abolish the stadtholderate entirely. He bolstered his policy by publicly endorsing the theory of republicanism. He allegedly contributed personally to the Interest of Holland, a radical republican textbook published in 1662, by his supporter Pieter de la Court. As a result, De Witt attracted the hatred of all supporters of the Oranges, who were mainly found among the common people.

==== War with England, conflict with France ====
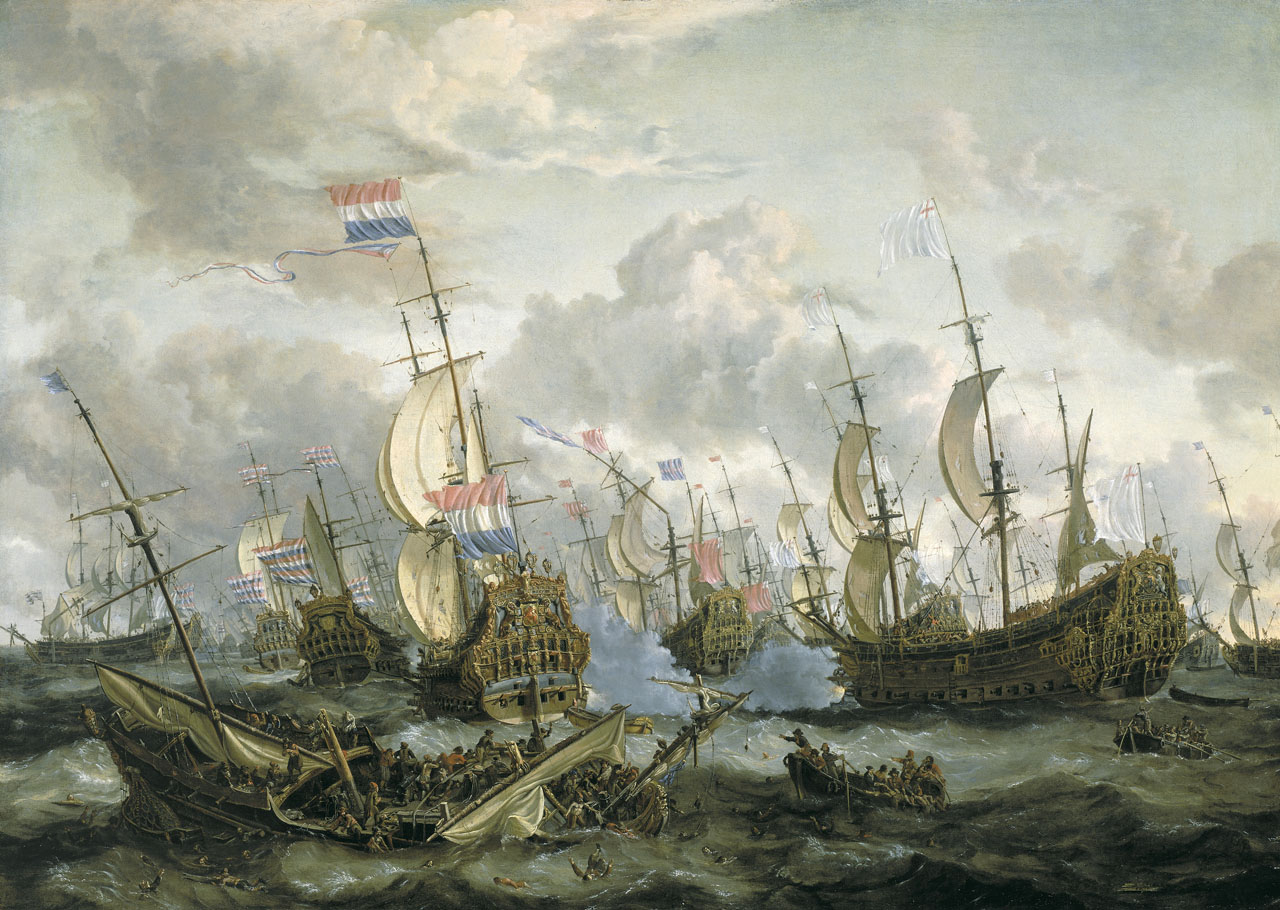
The Four Days' Battle, by Abraham Storck

After the death of Oliver Cromwell in 1658, the English monarchy was restored in 1660 as Charles II of England returned to power. This further deteriorated Anglo-Dutch relations, and five years later the Second Anglo-Dutch War broke out. De Witt reformed the Dutch naval forces by building larger and more heavily armed warships modelled after the English navy. After an initial defeat at the Battle of Lowestoft, he temporarily took command of the Dutch fleet himself. As a remedy for his seasickness, Christiaan Huygens, the inventor of the pendulum clock, developed a special hammock that did not rock. At the end of 1665 Michiel de Ruyter took over command of the Dutch navy at De Witt's instigation. Further fighting in 1666 and a massive plague and devastating fire in London caused severe economic difficulties in England. By 1667, the English were unable to put a new fleet to sea, De Witt took advantage of this by having the Dutch navy sail up the River Medway under the command of his brother Cornelis de Witt. At Chatham, Kent, the Dutch burnt several English warships anchored there. Dutch cannon fire was heard in London, causing panic to break out there. England then became ready for peace negotiations, in which De Witt was involved. The peace between the two states was sealed in 1667 with the Peace of Breda.

In 1667, with the support of Gaspar Fagel, Gillis Valckenier and his uncle Andries de Graeff, De Witt issued the Perpetual Edict, which abolished the governorship and thus the final overthrow of the House of Orange. and the incompatibility of a stadtholdership with the Captain Generalship of the Republic of the United Netherlands.

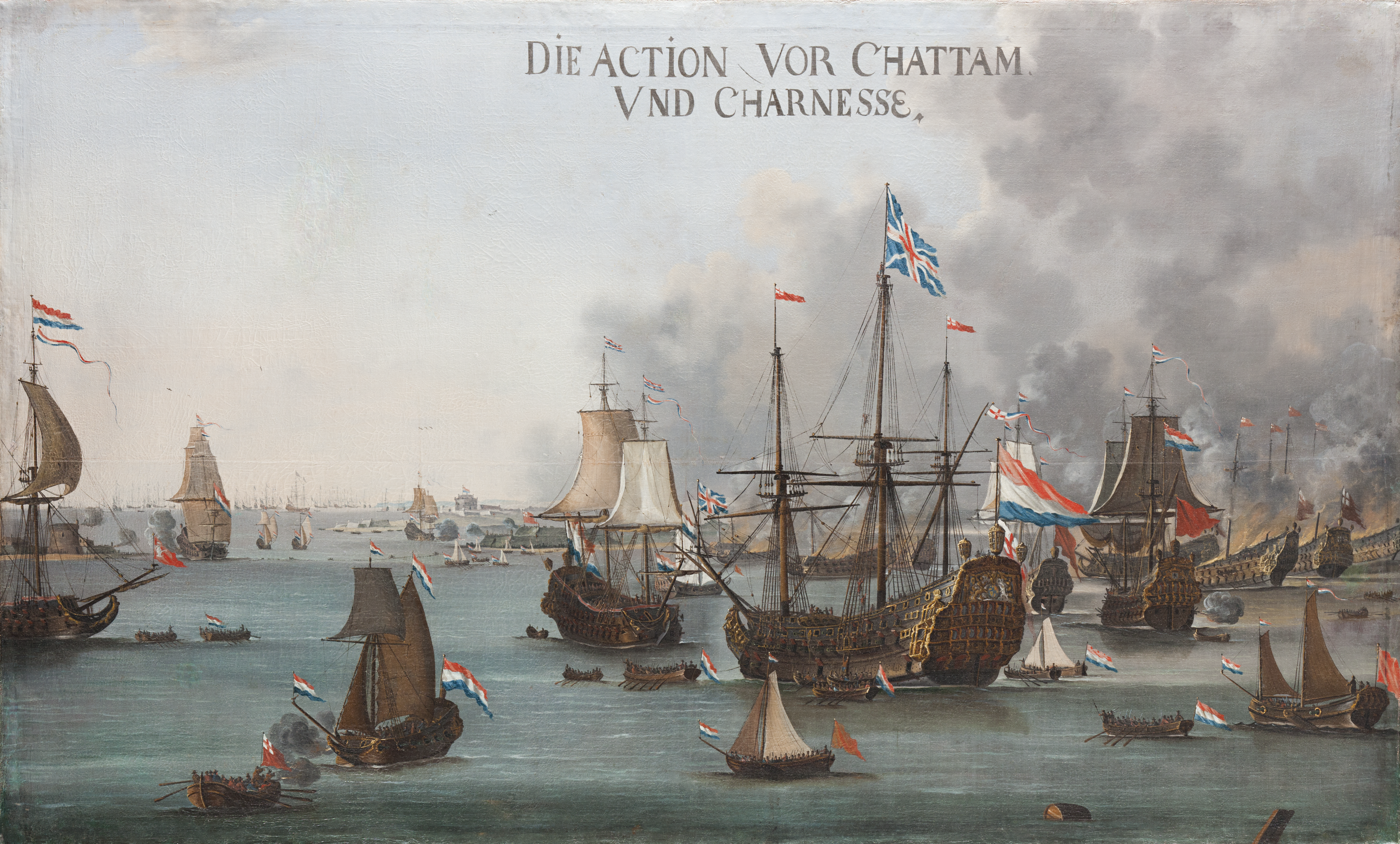
The raid on the Medway

As part of efforts by the States General to contest commercial superiority with England, the Dutch States Army was greatly neglected. This was not without danger because French politics at that time was characterized by unbridled expansionism, which was reinforced by the formidable economic competition of the Dutch Republic. Johan de Witt tried to guarantee the safety of the Republic with a pro-French policy but did not want to agree with King Louis XIV's plan to divide the Spanish Netherlands. He preferred a Spanish-administered buffer zone on the southern border of the Republic to a border with powerful France.

The Triple Alliance was concluded on 23 January 1668 with England and Sweden. It stipulated that the three countries would support each other militarily if France attacked one of them. De Witt nevertheless did not want a break with Louis XIV. It was therefore agreed to urge Spain to cede a number of cities in the Spanish Netherlands to him. Only if Louis XIV rejected this and prolonged the War of Devolution to take control of the whole area would the three countries take military force against France. Especially at De Witt's request, that last appointment was included in a secret clause because he did not want to offend the French. What De Witt did not know was that Charles II had only entered into the treaty to sever all Dutch-French ties for good. A month after its conclusion, he divulged the details of the secret clause to Louis XIV, who, eager for revenge, concluded the secret Treaty of Dover with England, stipulating that the Dutch Republic would be attacked jointly.

== Death ==
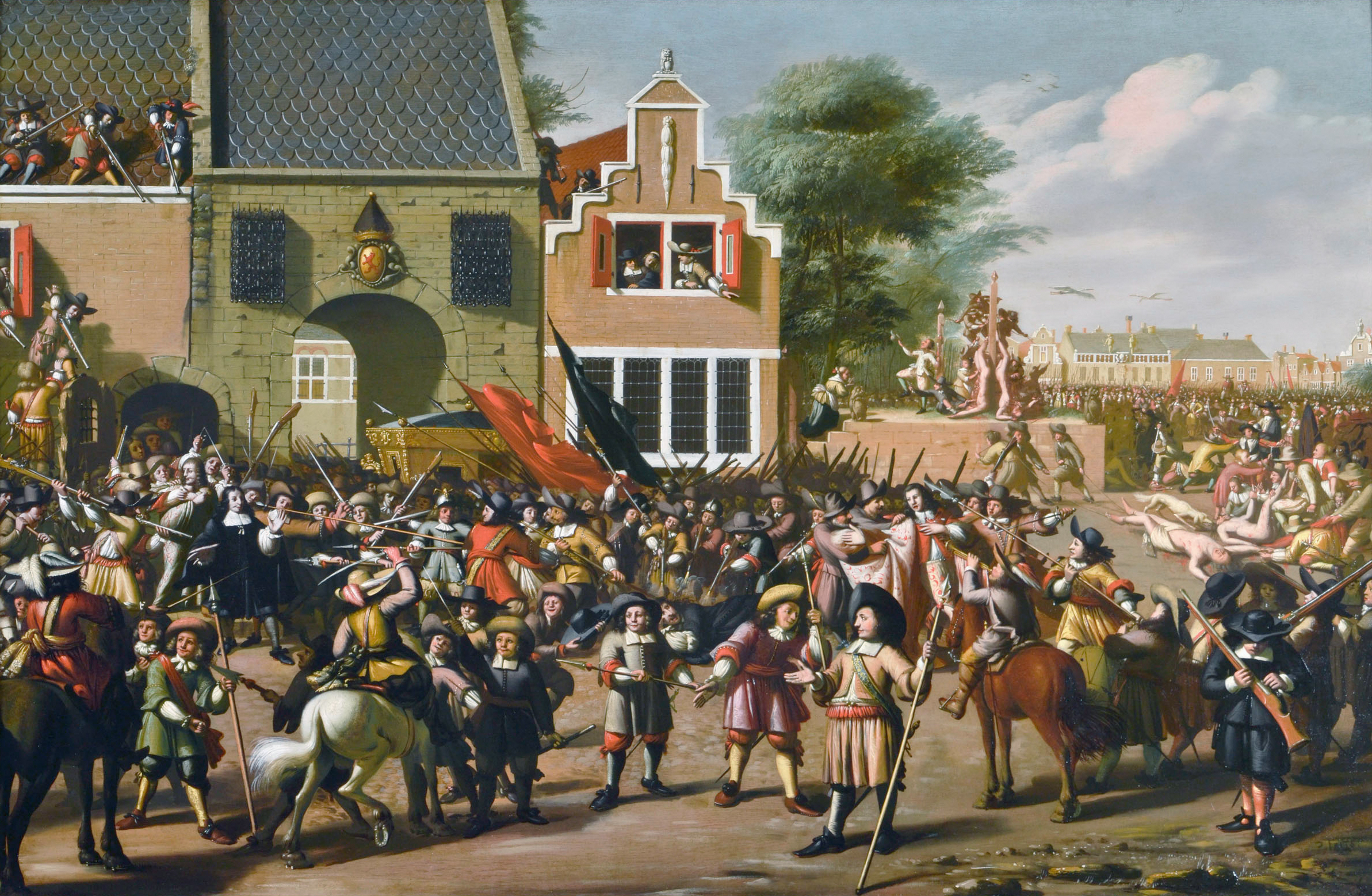
The murder of the de Witt brothers

During 1672, which the Dutch refer to as the Rampjaar ("disaster year"), England and France declared war on the Dutch Republic in the Third Anglo-Dutch War and the Franco-Dutch War, respectively. De Witt was severely wounded by a knife-wielding assassin on 21 June. He resigned as Grand Pensionary on 4 August, but this was not enough for his enemies. His brother Cornelis (who was deputy-in-the-field for de Ruyter at the Raid on the Medway), particularly hated by the Orangists, was arrested on trumped-up charges of treason. He was tortured (as was usual under Roman-Dutch law, which required a confession before a conviction was possible) but refused to confess. Nevertheless, he was sentenced to exile.

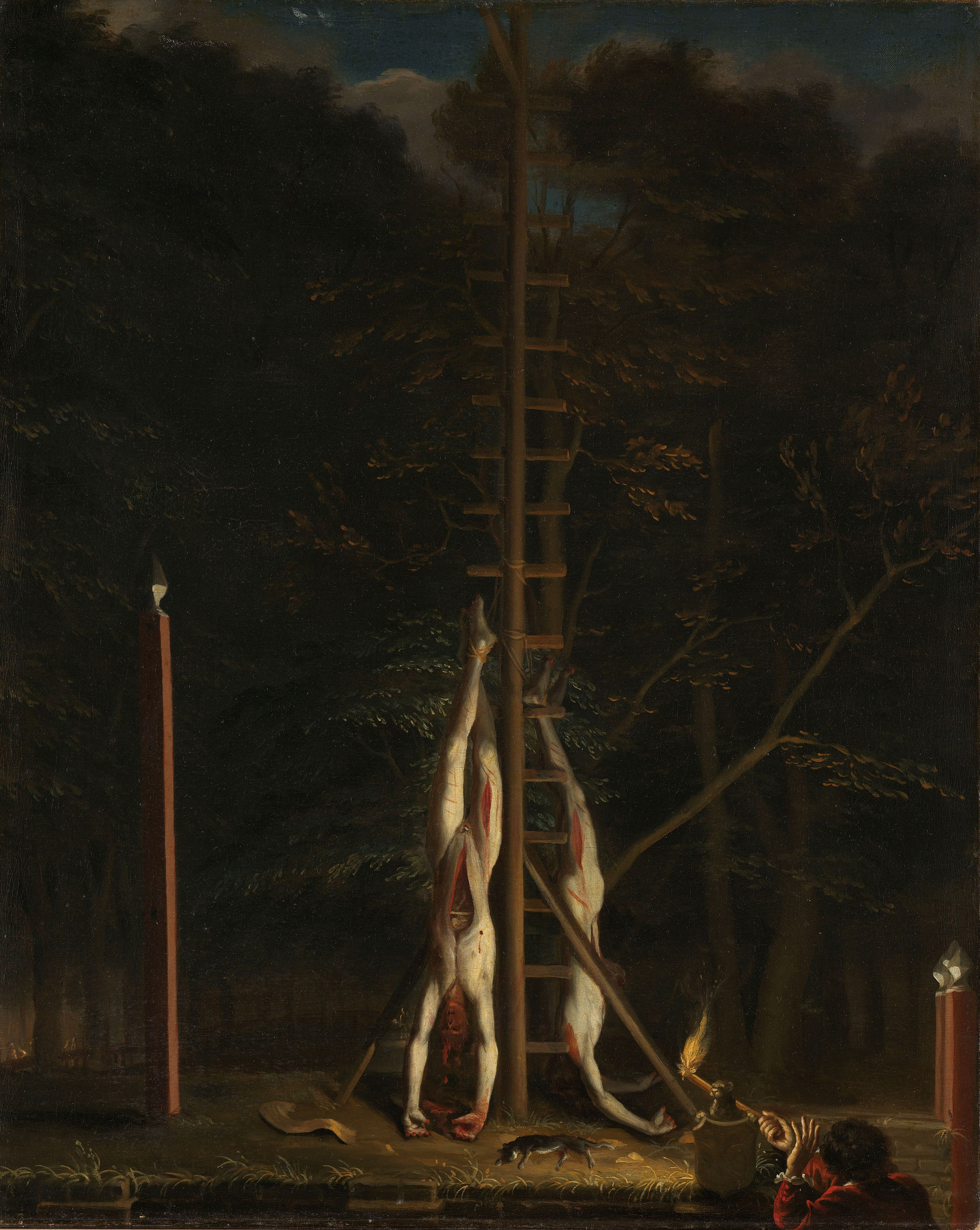
The Corpses of the De Witt Brothers, attributed to Jan de Baen

When his brother went over to the jail (which was only a few steps from his house) to help him get started on his journey, both were attacked by members of The Hague's civic militia. The brothers were shot and then left to the mob near Gevangenpoort. Their naked, mutilated bodies were strung up on the nearby public gibbet. Contemporary accounts reported acts of cannibalism, with some alleging that people roasted and ate pieces of the corpses, although the reliability of individual details and the extent of any consumption remain uncertain. Throughout the attack, a remarkable discipline was maintained by the mob, according to contemporary observers, lending doubt as to the spontaneity of the event.

De Witt had in effect ruled the Republic for almost 20 years. His regime outlasted him for only a few more days. Though no more people were killed, the lynching of the De Witts lent renewed impetus to the mob attacks, and to help restore public order the States of Holland empowered William on 27 August to purge the city councils in any way he would see fit to restore public order. The following purges in the early days of September were accompanied by large, but peaceful, Orangist demonstrations, that had a remarkable political character.

The demonstrations delivered petitions that demanded certain additional reforms with a, in a sense, "reactionary" flavour: the "ancient" privileges of the guilds and civic militias – who were traditionally seen as mouthpieces of the citizenry as a whole – to curb the regent's powers were to be recognised again (as in pre-Burgundian times). The demonstrators also demanded more influence of the Calvinist preachers on the content of government policies and a roll-back of the toleration of Catholics and other dissenting denominations. The purges of the city governments were not everywhere equally thoroughgoing (and, of course, there was little mention of popular influence later on, as the new regents shared the abhorrence of the old ones of real democratic reforms). But as a whole, the new Orangist regime of the Stadtholder was well-entrenched during his following reign.

Whether William had a hand in the murder of the de Witt brothers remains unanswered, like his exact role in the later Massacre of Glencoe. That he ordered the withdrawal of a federal cavalry detachment that otherwise might have prevented the lynching has always raised eyebrows. He did not prosecute the well-known ringleaders like Johan van Banchem, Cornelis Tromp, and Johan Kievit, even advancing their careers. In any case, the political turmoil did not give the allies an opportunity to finish the Republic off. The French were effectively stymied by the water defences. Only when the inundations froze over in the following winter was there, briefly, a chance for Marshal Luxembourg, who had taken over command of the invading army from Louis, to make an incursion with 10,000 troops over ice. This almost ended in disaster, when they were ambushed. Meanwhile, the States General managed to conclude alliances with the German emperor and Brandenburg, which helped relieve the French pressure in the East.

== Mathematics ==
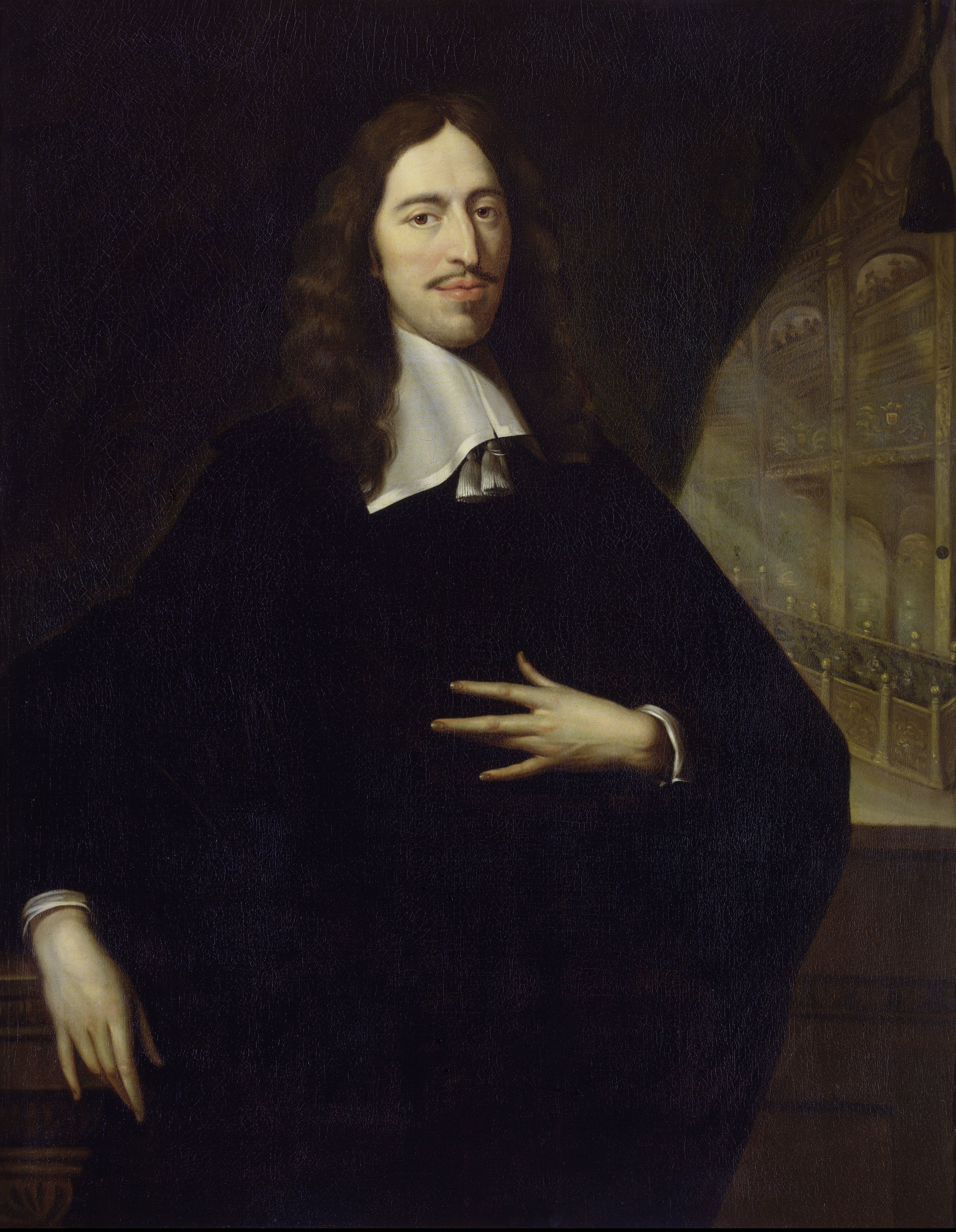
Portrait of Johan de Witt by Jan de Baen, c. 1669

The kinematic description of ellipses dates from Archimedes and Proclus, as well as the contemporary Claude Mydorge. Johan de Witt describes the hyperbola with a rotating line and a sliding angle, and a parabola by means of a rotating angle and sliding line. In 1661, de Witt's work appeared in the second volume of von Schooten's Latin translation of La Géométrie. Elementa Curvarum Linearum has been described as the first textbook in analytic geometry. De Witt composed the work in 1646 at the age of 23. In this work, whose content is largely based upon earlier work in analytic geometry by René Descartes and Pierre de Fermat, he treated the subject of conic sections from a synthetic and an analytic point of view. The second book of the Elementa Curvarum Linearum is considered to be the first systematic treatise on conic sections using the new method. And although both Fermat and Descartes came to the same conclusions, De Witt was the first to give all the details to solve the locus problem for quadratic equations.

De Witt contributed to financial mathematics: The Worth of Life Annuities Compared to Redemption Bonds. This work combined his roles as a statesman and as a mathematician and was discussed in the correspondence between Leibniz and Bernoulli concerning the use of probabilities. Ever since the Middle Ages, a life annuity was a way to obtain a regular income from a reliable source. The state, for instance, could provide a widow with a regular income until her death, in exchange for a 'lump sum' up front. There were also redemption bonds that were more like regular state loans. De Witt showed that for the same principal, a bond paying 4% interest would result in the same profit as a life annuity of 6% (1 in 17). But the 'Staten' at the time were paying over 7% (1 in 14). The publication about life annuities is "one of the first applications of probability in economics."

Political offices
Preceded by Nicolaas Ruys	Pensionary of Dordrecht; 1650–1653	Succeeded by Govert van Slingelandt
Preceded by Adriaan Pauw	Grand Pensionary; 1653–1672	Succeeded by Gaspar Fagel
