= Jean Deutz =

Dutch financer

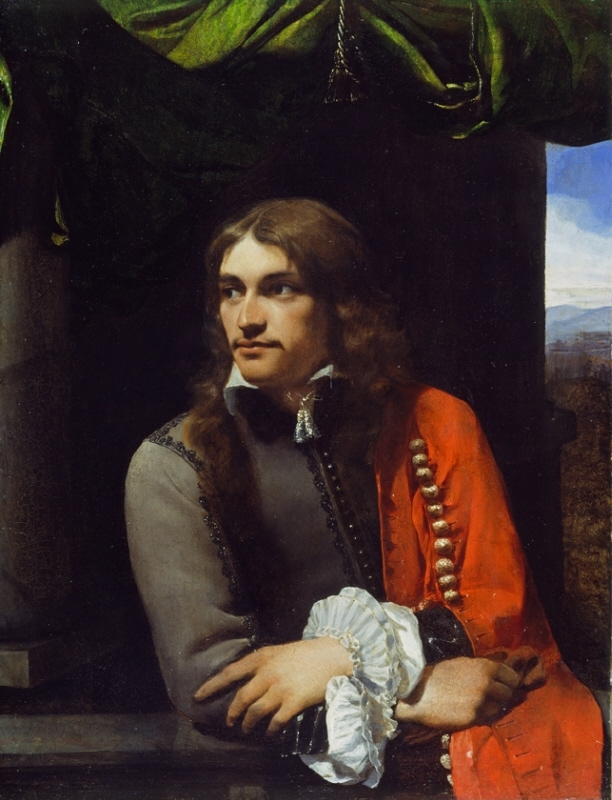
Jean Deutz (alleged) painted by Michiel Sweerts (around 1650).

Jean Deutz (November 29, 1618 in Amsterdam, -August 1673) was a Dutch merchant, banker and financier of his brother-in-law Grand pensionary Johan de Witt.

== Biography ==
=== Family ===
Jean Deutz came from the Deutz family, which moved from Cologne to Amsterdam in the early 17th century. His parents were Johan Deutz (1581 in Cologne–1638 in Amsterdam), merchant of goods from East India, and Elisabeth Coymans (1595–1653).

Jean originally worked as a wool and silk merchant. In 1654 Jean Deutz married Geertruid Bicker (1634–1702), daughter of Jan Bicker and Agneta de Graeff van Polsbroek. He also invited the young Grand pensionary Johan de Witt and introduced him to his sister-in-law Wendela Bicker. Wendela and Johan married the following year. This double marriage brought Deutz the relationship to the most important Republican circles in Holland, the Bicker, De Graeff and De Witt families. In addition to De Witt, his brothers-in-law included arms dealer Jacob Trip, politician Pieter de Graeff and high civil servant Gerard Bicker (I) van Swieten.

The couple Jean and Geertruid Deutz had three children:

- Jean Deutz van Assendelft (1655–1719), married Maria Boreel
- Agneta Deutz (1657–1678), married her full cousin Cornelis de Graeff
- Isabella Deutz (1658–1694), married Diederik Hoeufft

When Deutz's sister-in-law Wendela Bicker died in 1668, he and his brother-in-law Pieter de Graeff were appointed guardians of their nephews and nieces, including Johan de Witt Jr., and were responsible for handling the estate.

=== Career ===
Intimacy subsequently developed between Deutz and De Witt, and De Witt was often a guest of Deutz, both in Amsterdam and at the country house Den Eult near Baarn, a wedding present from his parents-in-law. Deutz was a trusted advisor to De Witt on financial matters, and funded the Republic's wars under his brother-in-law. In 1659, on the basis of De Witt's recommendation, Emperor Leopold I granted him the right and monopoly to sell imperial Austrian mercury in (Northern) Europe. He also received the title of Imperial Factor for the Mercury in Amsterdam. The mercury came from Idrija in today's Slovenia, and was exported to Venice as well as Amsterdam. De Witt also helped Deutz sign a commercial treaty with the Spanish Crown, which used the mercury in the silver mines of Mexico. In 1669, he managed to acquire the monopoly by buying up all the shares of the Venetian competitors. After his death, his widow Geertruid continued to run the company and granted Emperor Leopold I loans during the Great Turkish War against the Ottoman Empire and the War of the Spanish Succession.
