= Jan Bicker =

Dutch general contractor (1591–1653)

Jan Gerritsz Bicker
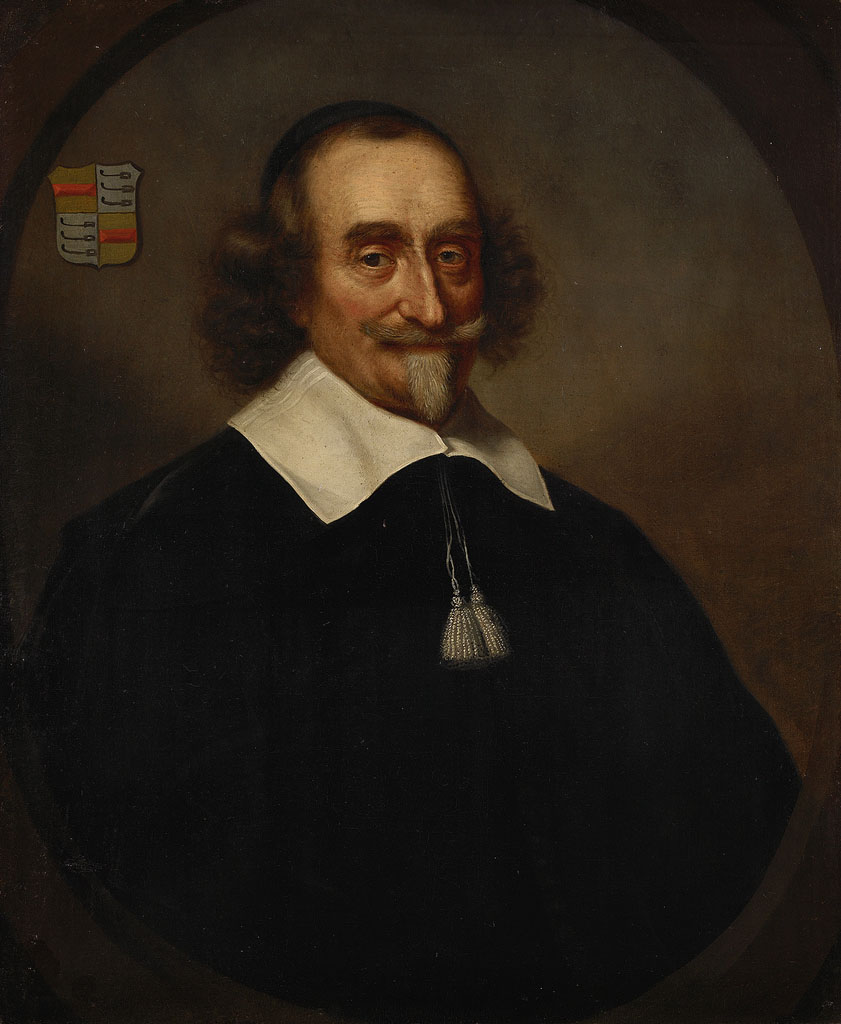

Schepen of Amsterdam
- In office 1647 and – in 1651

Burgemeester of Amsterdam
- In office 1653–1653

Personal details
- Born: 1591
- Died: 1653 (aged 61–62)
- Party: Dutch States Party

Jan Gerritsz. Bicker (August 1591–May 1653) was a general contractor, shipping magnate, mayor (burgomaster) and a member of the Bicker family, influential regenten from Amsterdam.

De Bickers, also called "Bickerse ligue", were part of the staatsgezinde partij (the republican party) and opponents of the stadtholders, who belonged to the House of Orange-Nassau. Jan Bickers son-in-law, the influential Grand Pensionary Johan de Witt practically controlled the Republic during the First Stadtholderless Period in 1650–1672.

== Biography ==
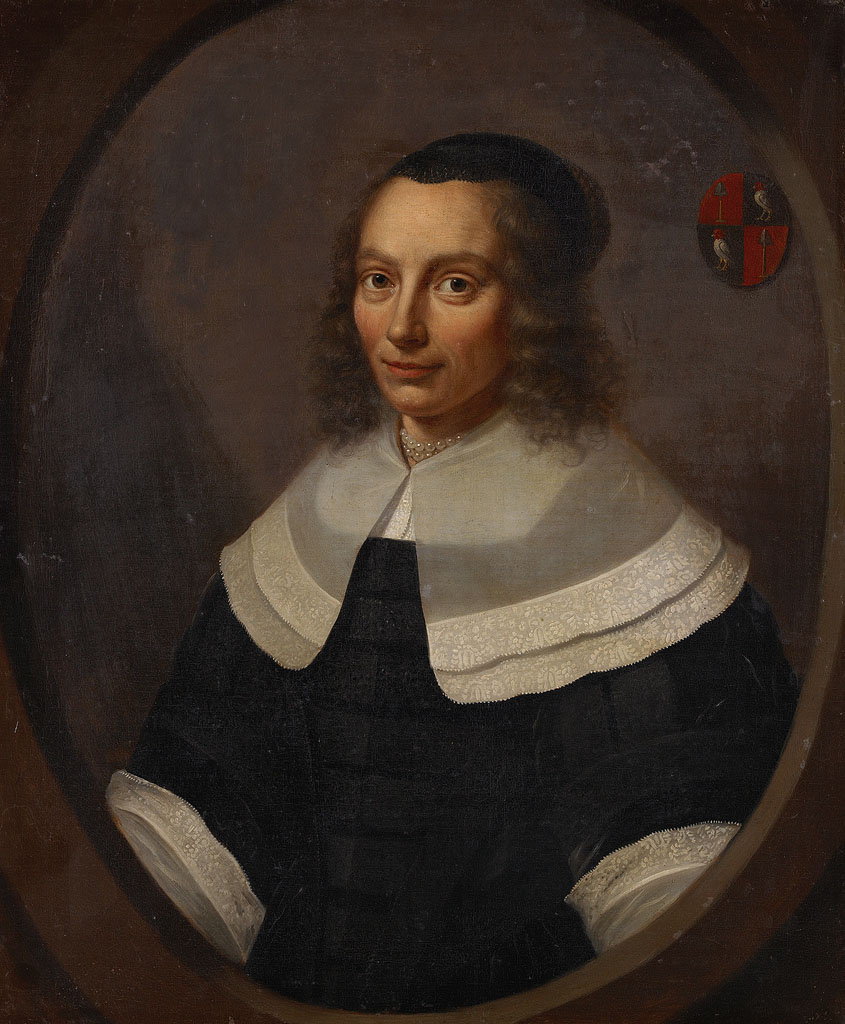
Agneta de Graeff (1603-1656)

Jan (or Joan or Jean) Bicker was a son of Gerrit Bicker and Aleyd Andriesdr Boelens Loen. Jan's oldest brother Andries Bicker ruled the city administration for many years and was supported in his (foreign) policy by his brothers Jacob, director in the VOC and Cornelis Bicker, director in the WIC. Jan Bicker was married to Agneta de Graeff van Polsbroek, a sister of the burgomasters and statesmen Cornelis and Andries de Graeff. Five daughters were born from this marriage:

- Elisabeth Bicker (1630–1660) married Jacobus Trip, a lawyer, arms dealer and participant in the WIC.
- Geertruida Bicker (1634–1702) married in December 1654 Jean Deutz, who traded in quicksilver from Idrija. After his death, she continued to run the company, granted Emperor Leopold I loans during the Great Turkish War against the Ottoman Empire. In 1692 and 1696, she financed the recruitment of soldiers and sailors for Prince Eugene of Savoy. She financed the emperor in the War of the Spanish Succession; she died at Assumburg castle.
- Wendela Bicker (1635–1668) married in February 1655 Johan de Witt, whose dominance in Dutch politics persisted until the Year of Disaster. The wedding party, in a year with plague and restrictions, took place at Bickerseiland. She inherited several plots which were sold in 1658.
- Cornelia Bicker (1638–1665), married in May 1658 her full cousin Gerard Bicker (I) van Swieten
- Jacoba Bicker (1640–1695) married in April 1662 her full cousin Pieter de Graeff

=== Career ===
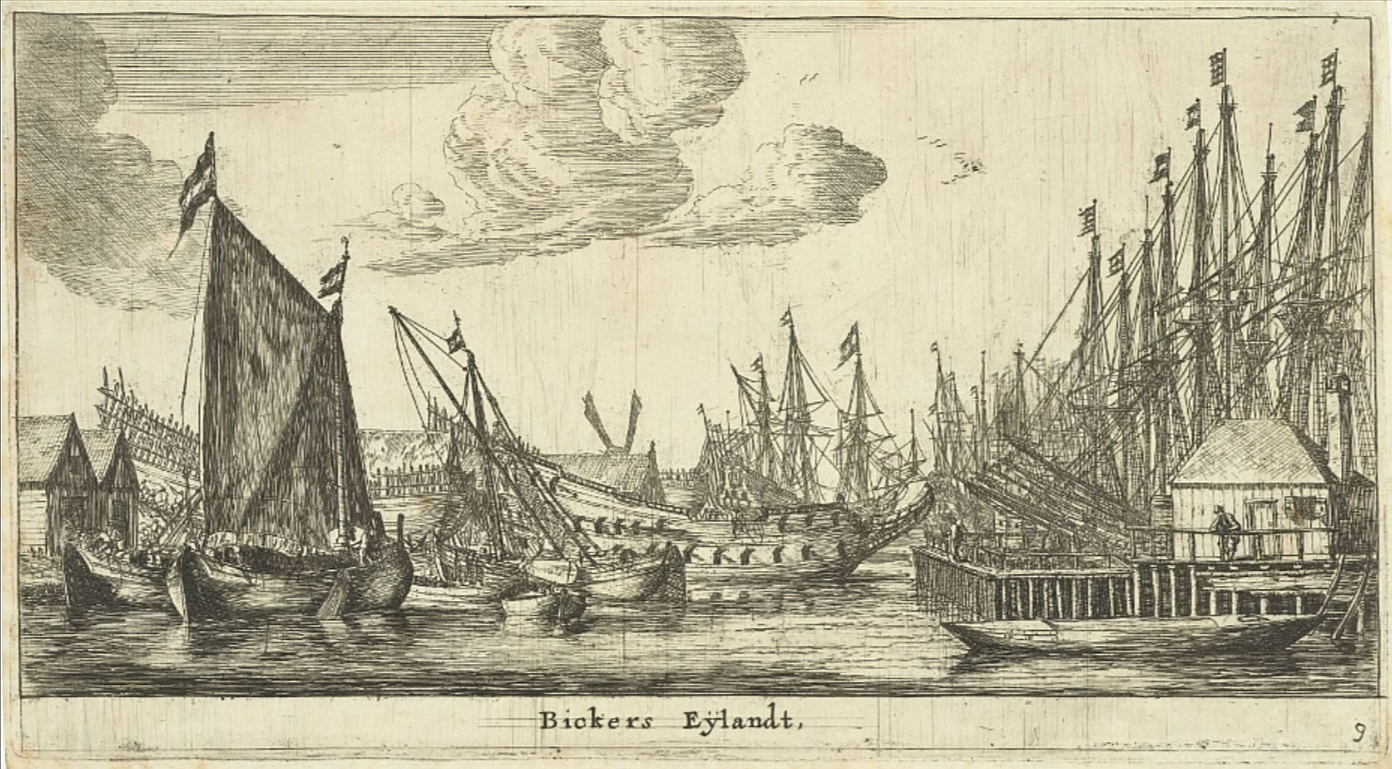
Bickerseiland by Reinier Nooms

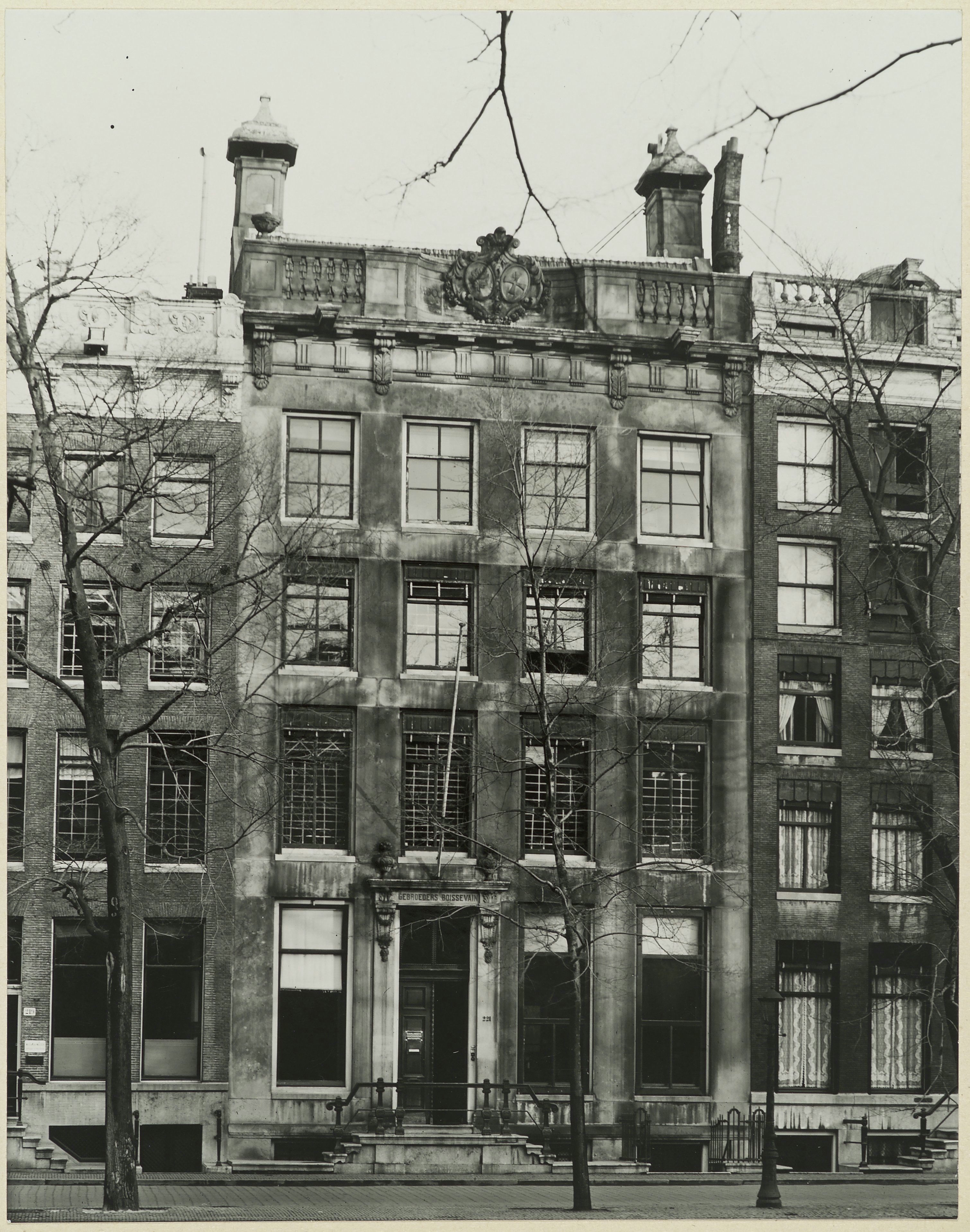
Keizersgracht 221

In 1625 he became director of the Levantine trade. At some time Jan Bicker became the city's inspector of the ropes. Together with his brothers, he exerted a great influence on the economic climate in Holland. The Bicker family was Calvinist and focused on Amsterdam's economic boom.

From 1628 Jan Bicker lived at Keizersgracht 221 and invested specifically at Bickerseiland which he bought from the city in January 1631. Within twelve years he had ship wharfs, (ware)houses and a tower built so he could watch his project. In 1634 he invested in Cayenne as patroon. Around 1638 he and Abraham Boom supplied ships of war to France, ordered by Cardinal Richelieu. From the late 1630s they came into opposition to the stadtholders.

Jan Bicker was an influential member of the "Bickerse ligue", which included his brothers Andries, Jacob, Cornelis, and their distant cousins, the brothers Roelof, Jacob and Hendrick Jacobsz Bicker. They opposed the stadtholder Frederick Henry, Prince of Orange, who intended the centralize the five admiralties, which would cause the Admiralty of Amsterdam to lose influence. In 1647 and 1651 Jan was elected schepen in the city council. Jan Bicker was given the position of burgemeester in February 1653, but did not keep it for long due his death on 9 May; he was buried in Westerkerk. With a fortune of 717,000 guilders, Bicker was one of the richest people of the Golden Age. He owned various country estates outside Amsterdam: Akerendam near Beverwijk, as well as De Eult and Hooge Vuursche in Baarn.

=== Bicker Family ===
The Bicker family was one of the oldest families of Amsterdam and belonged to the leading regent-oligarchy. They were a major trading family involved in the VOC and WIC. The Bickers were the most powerful family in Amsterdam and decisively determined the fortunes of the city. The Bicker-De Graeff family-faction became the strongest competitor in the years after the Dutch uprising. Through their work on the Amsterdam City Council, the Dutch East India and West India Company, the schutterij and the Wisselbank, the Bickers gained enormous influence on politico-economic self-determination in the Dutch Republic. The Bicker brothers had a firm grip on world trade, trading on the East- and the West-Indies, the Baltic and the Mediterranean.

== Literature ==
Matthias Laurenz Gräff: Johan Bicker (1591-1653). Über das Gewicht von Handel und Politik im Goldenen Zeitalter der Niederlande, (2026)
