= De Witt (family) =

Old Dutch patrician and regenten family

- Family
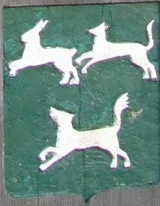
- Country: Netherlands
- Founded: 13th century
- Founder: Jan de Witte
- Styles: Vrijheer van Jaarsveld, Heer van Zuid- en Noord-Linschoten, Snelrewaard and IJsselveere

De Witt (Note: Also spelled De Wit, De Witte, De With, and DeWitt.) is the name of an old Dutch patrician and regenten family. Originally from Dordrecht, the genealogy of the family begins with Jan de Witte, a patrician who lived around 1295. The family have played an important role during the Dutch Golden Age. They were at the centre of Dordrecht and Holland oligarchy from the end of the 16th century until 1672, and belonged to the Dutch States Party.

== The De Witt family during the Dutch Golden Age ==
During the Dutch Golden Age, the republican de Witt family opposed the royalists associated with the House of Orange-Nassau. With other republican political leaders at Dordrecht, such as the van Slingelandts, and at Amsterdam with the Bicker and de Graeff families, the de Witts worked to abolish stadtholdership. They sought full sovereignty for individual regions, so that the Republic of the United Seven Netherlands would not yield to authoritarianism. Instead of a sovereigns (or stadtholder), political and military power would be entrusted to the States General and Holland's city regents.

From 1650 into the 1670s, the de Witts played leading roles in Dutch government. Republicans called this era the Ware Vrijheid (True Freedom), the First Stadtholderless Period.

The de Witt family lost its leadership role in Rampjaar 1672, when Orangists resumed leadership and murdered brothers Johan and Cornelis de Witt.

== Family members (selection) ==
- Jan Godschalksz de Witte (1335–), mayor of Dordrecht in 1375
- Cornelis Fransz de Witt (1545–1622), mayor and regent of Dordrecht, member of the States of Holland and West Friesland
- Jacob Fransz de Witt (1548–1621), mayor of Dordrecht, member of the States of Holland
- Andries de Witt (1573–1637), Grand Pensionary of Holland
- Johan de Witt (1618–1676), Burgemeester and regent of Dordrecht
- Jacob de Witt (1589–1674), mayor and regent of Dordrecht, member of the States of Holland
- Cornelis de Witt (1623–1672), mayor and regent of Dordrecht, ruwaard or governor of the land of Putten, deputy of the States to the Dutch Navy during the Second Anglo-Dutch War
- Johan de Witt (1625–1672), heer van Zuid- en Noord-Linschoten, Snelrewaard and IJsselveere, Grand Pensionary of Holland
- Johan de Witt Jr. (1662–1701), heer van Zuid- en Noord-Linschoten, Snelrewaard and IJsselveere, secretary of the city of Dordrecht
- Cornelis Johansz de Witt (1696–1769), vrijheer van Jaarsveld, Burgemeester of Dordrecht, member of the States of Holland
- The early 19th Century American politician DeWitt Clinton was descended from the Dutch De Witt family, via his mother Mary De Witt (1737–1795)
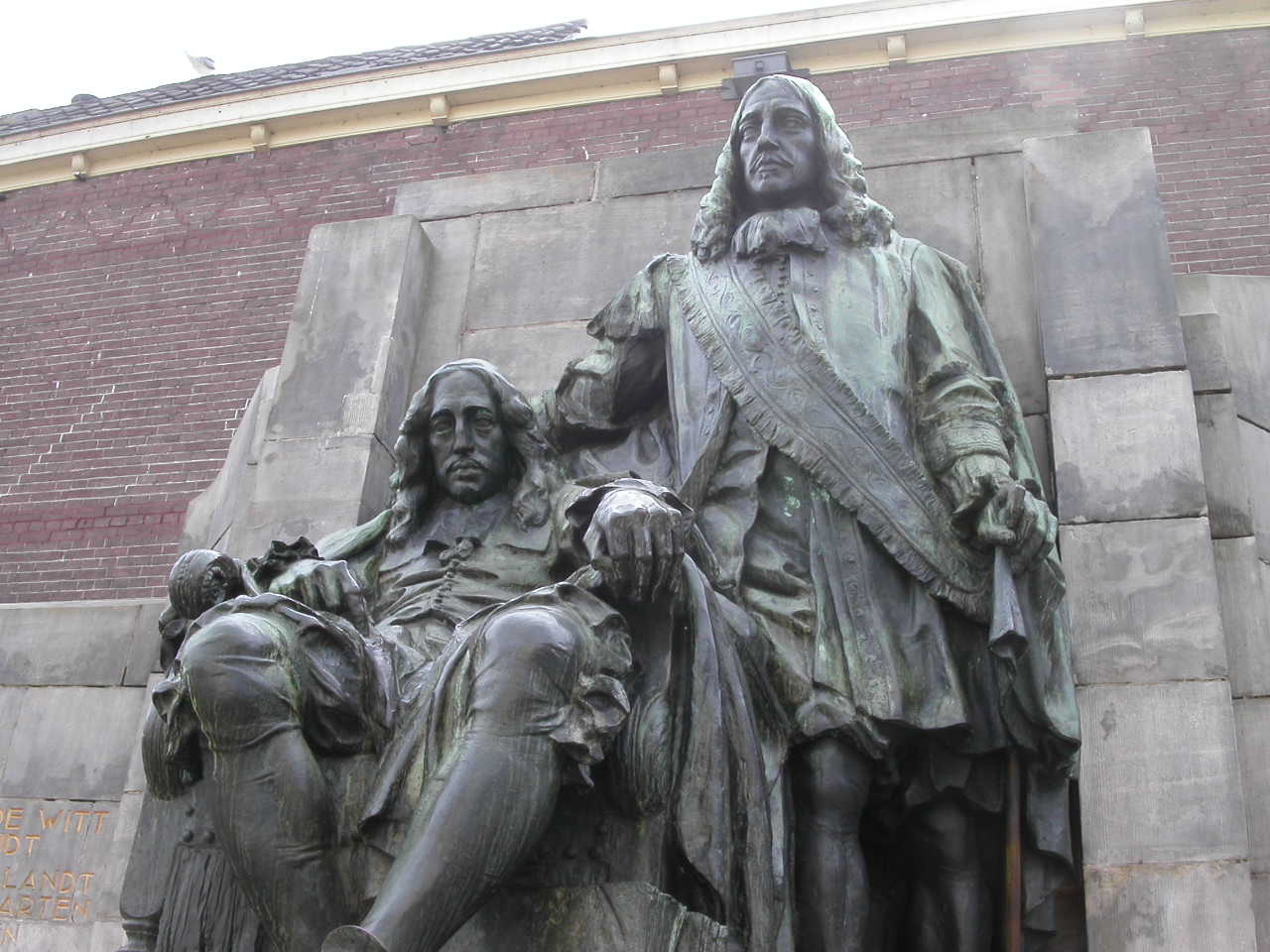
Statue of Johan (left) and Cornelis de Witt in Dordrecht

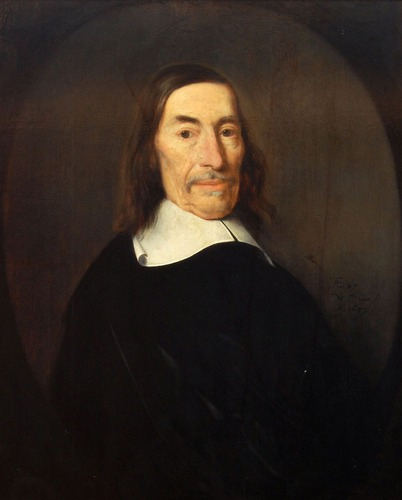
Jacob de Witt, painted by Nicolaes Maes in 1657, Dordrechts Museum

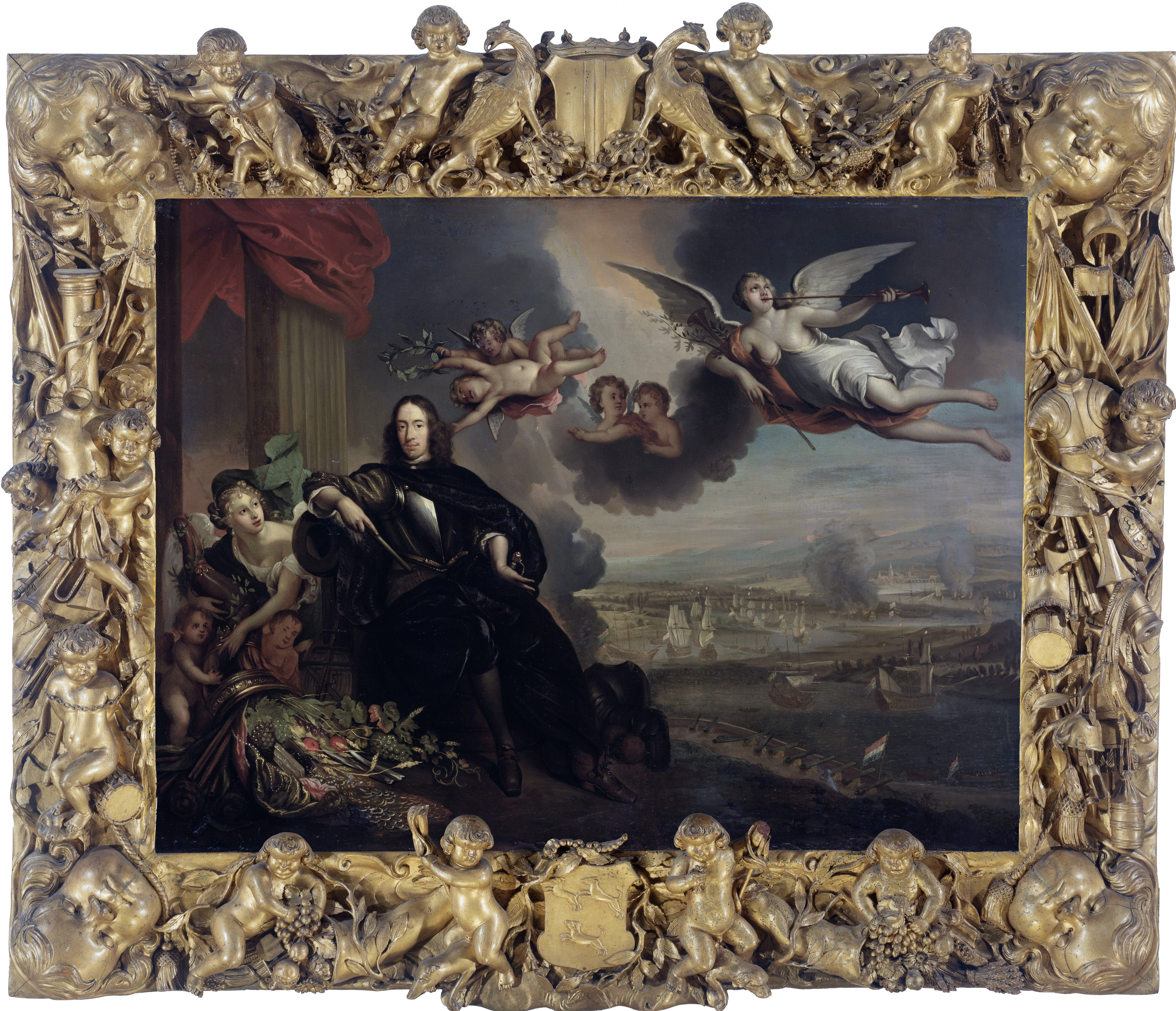
Cornelis de Witt, painted by Jan de Baen between 1667 and 1670, Rijksmuseum

== See also ==
- De Witte family (Belgian noble family)

== About homonym family ==
- The noble family "de Witte" (from Antwerpen)
