= Agneta de Graeff van Polsbroek =

Mother-in-law of Johan de Witt

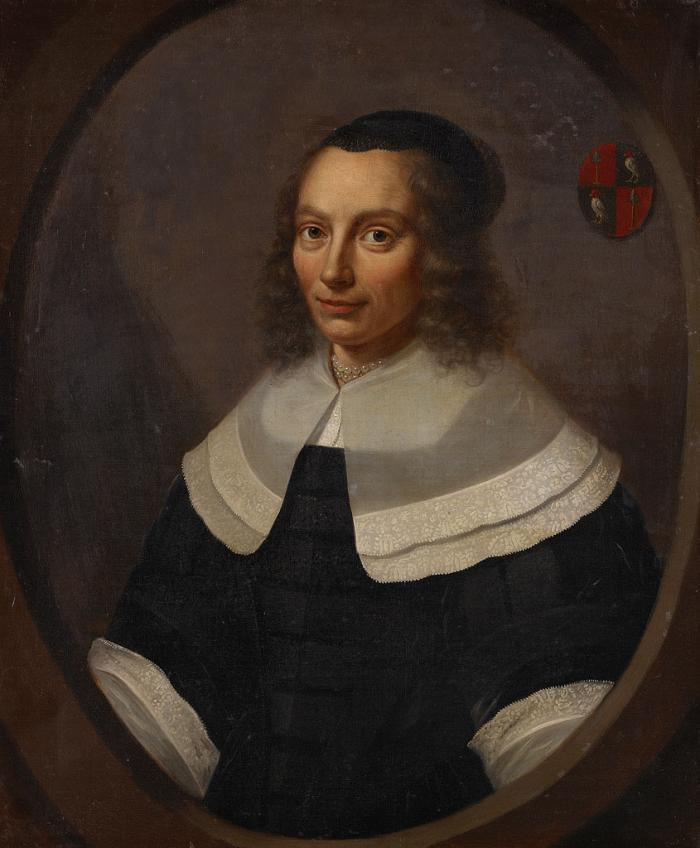
Agneta de Graeff van Polsbroek (ca. 1663/64), painted by Wallerant Vaillant

Agneta de Graeff van Polsbroek (Amsterdam, 10 November 1603 ibid 3 or 4 March 1656), was a patrician woman from the Dutch Golden Age. She became known as the mother-in-law of Johan de Witt.

== Biography ==
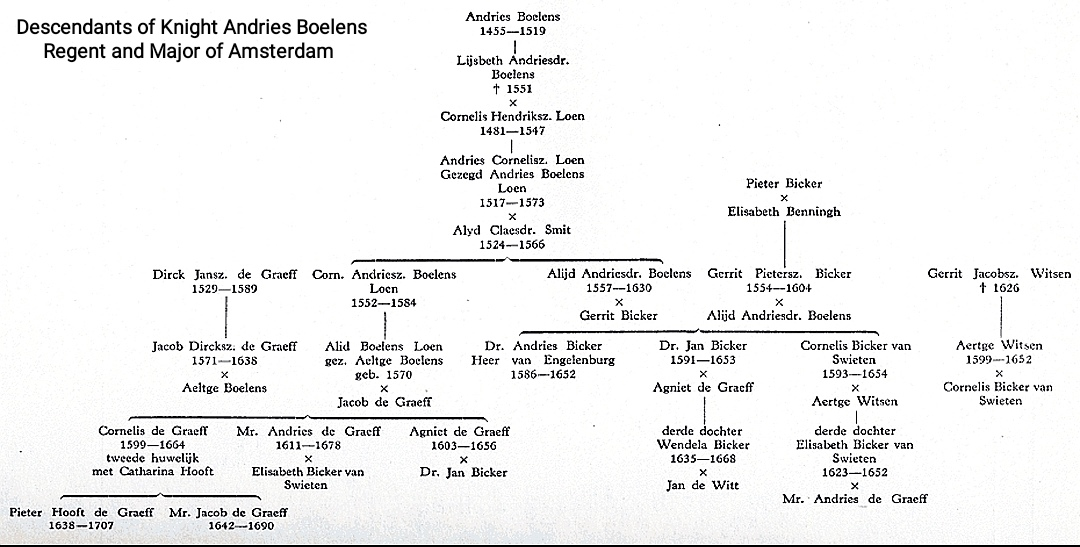
Overview of the personal family relationships of the Amsterdam oligarchy between the regent-dynasties Boelens Loen, De Graeff, Bicker (van Swieten), Witsen and Johan de Witt in the Dutch Golden Age

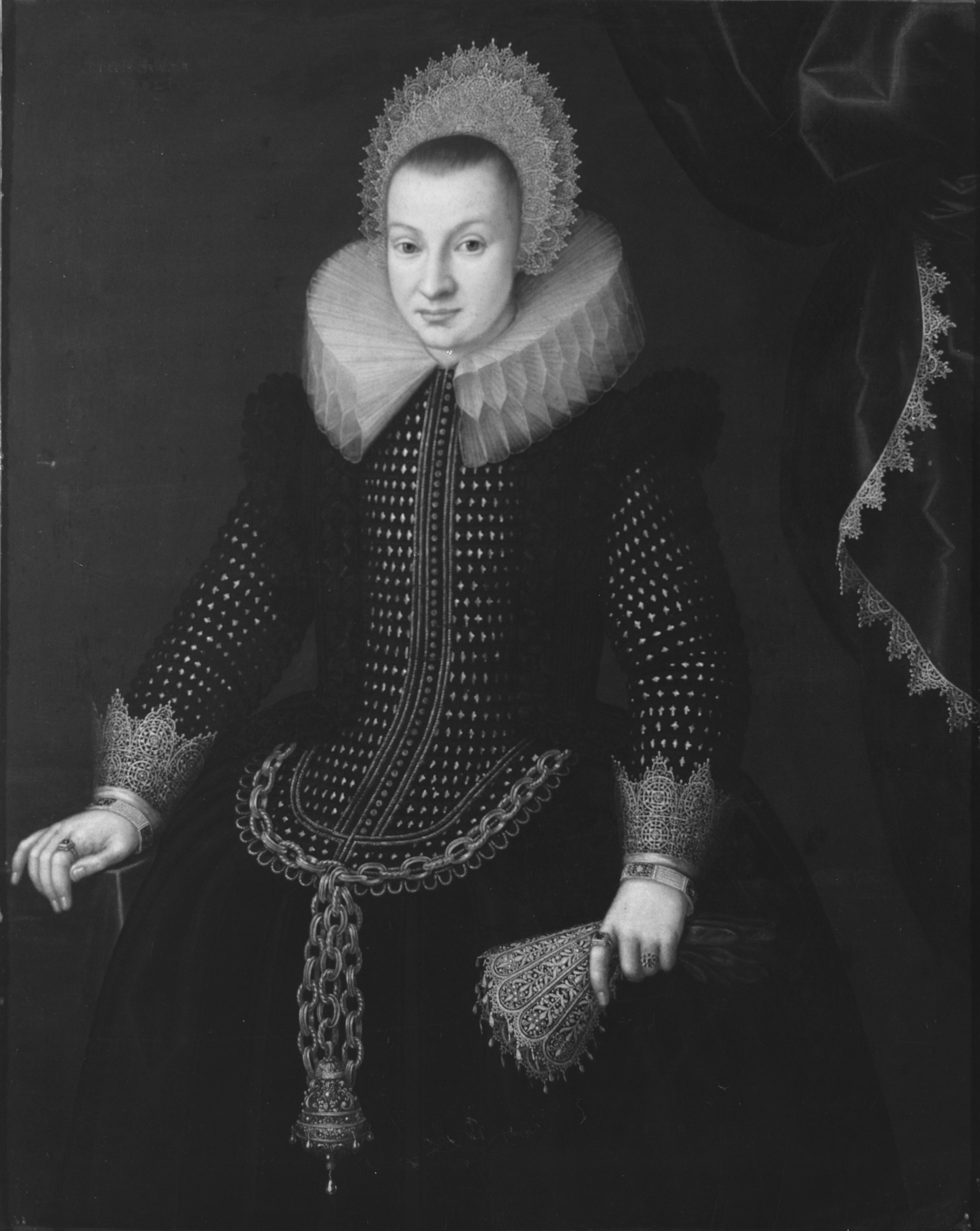
Agneta de Graeff van Polsbroek in 1621 at the age of 18

Agneta was a scion of the De Graeff family and born as the oldest daughter of Jacob Dircksz de Graeff and Aeltje Boelens Loen (1579-1630), herself daughter of the politician Cornelis Andriesz Boelens Loen (1552-1584), great-grandson of Andries Boelens (1455–1519), a famous regent of Amsterdam. In 1625 she was married to later Amsterdam burgomaster Jan Bicker. The couple had five daughters:

- Elisabeth Bicker (1630–1660) married Jacobus Trip, a wealthy arms dealer
- Geertruida Bicker (1634–1702) married Jean Deutz, a rich Banker and Investor of Amsterdam
- Wendela Bicker (1635–1668) married Johan de Witt
- Cornelia Bicker (1638–1665), married her full cousin Gerard Bicker (I) van Swieten
- Jacoba Bicker (1640–1695) married her full cousin Pieter de Graeff

The couple lived at their country houses De Eult at Baarn, Akerendam and Duynwijck in Beverwijk. Between the city of Amsterdam they owned a cityhause at Herengracht and an island, called Bickerseiland. In 1663/64 Agneta was painted by Wallerant Vaillant. Her tomb chapel is located at the Westerkerk.

== Coat of arms ==
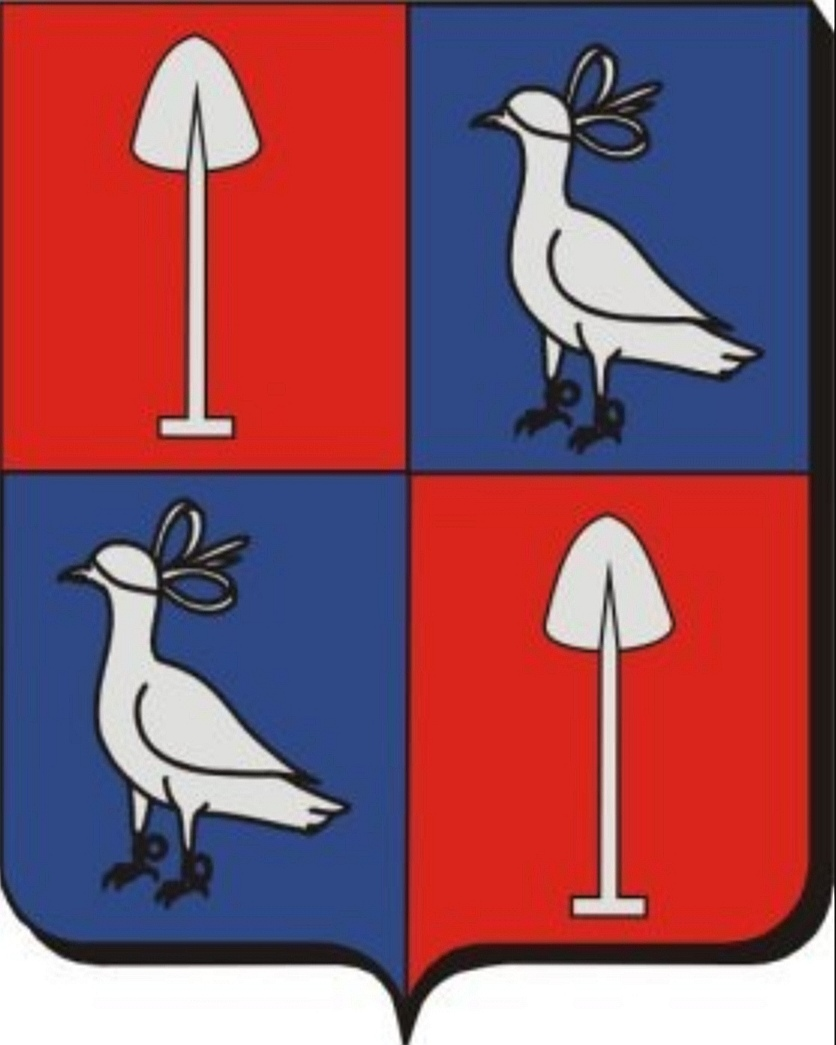
Coat of arms

Agneta de Graeff van Polsbroek's coat of arms was quartered and showed the following symbols:

- field 1 (left above) the silver shovel on a red background of their paternal ancestors, the Herren von Graben
- field 2 (right above) it shows a silver falcon on a blue background. The origin of the falcon lies in the possession of the Valckeveen estate (later the Valckenburg estate) in Gooiland
- field 3 (left below), same as field 2
- field 4 (right below), same as field 1
- helmet covers in red and silver
- helm adornment shows an upright silver spade with ostrich feathers (Herren von Graben)
- motto: MORS SCEPTRA LIGONIBUS AEQUAT (DEATH MAKES SEPTRES AND HOES EQUAL)

== Literature ==
- Graeff, P. de (P. de Graeff Gerritsz en Dirk de Graeff van Polsbroek) Genealogie van de familie De Graeff van Polsbroek, Amsterdam 1882.
- Bruijn, J. H. de Genealogie van het geslacht De Graeff van Polsbroek 1529/1827, met bijlagen. De Built 1962-63.
- Fölting, H.P., 'De landsadvocaten en raadpensionarissen der Staten van Holland en West-Friesland 1480–1795. Een genealogische benadering. Deel III' in: Jaarboek Centraal Bureau Voor Genealogie. Deel 29 (1975 Den Haag; Centraal Bureau Voor Genealogie) p. 210-269, (213)
