= Jacoba Bicker =

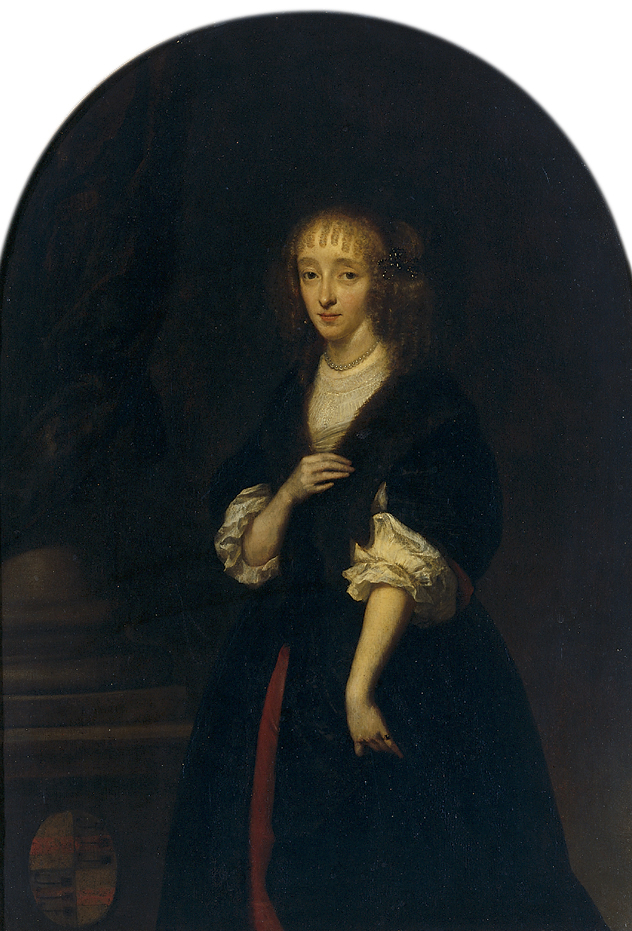
Marriage portrait of Jacoba Bicker in 1663, painted by Caspar Netscher, Rijksmuseum Amsterdam

Jacoba Bicker (Amsterdam, January 2, 1640 - June 29, 1695) was from the Bicker family, which was one of the leading pro-state families in the Dutch Golden Age.

== Biography ==
Jacoba Bicker was born as the daughter of Jan Bicker and his cousin Agneta de Graeff van Polsbroek, one of her sisters was Wendela Bicker, the wife of Grand pensionary Johan de Witt. She had many well-known and important relatives; Andries de Graeff and the brothers Andries and Cornelis Bicker were her uncle, and Johan and Cornelis de Witt were her cousins. The protagonists of the patriciate were closely related, and in 1663, at the age of 22, she married her other cousin Pieter de Graeff at Ilpenstein Castle. Grand pensionary De Witt was also present there and gave the wedding speech. The poets Jan Vos, Joost van den Vondel and Gerard Brandt, who were present, "sang about" this wedding.

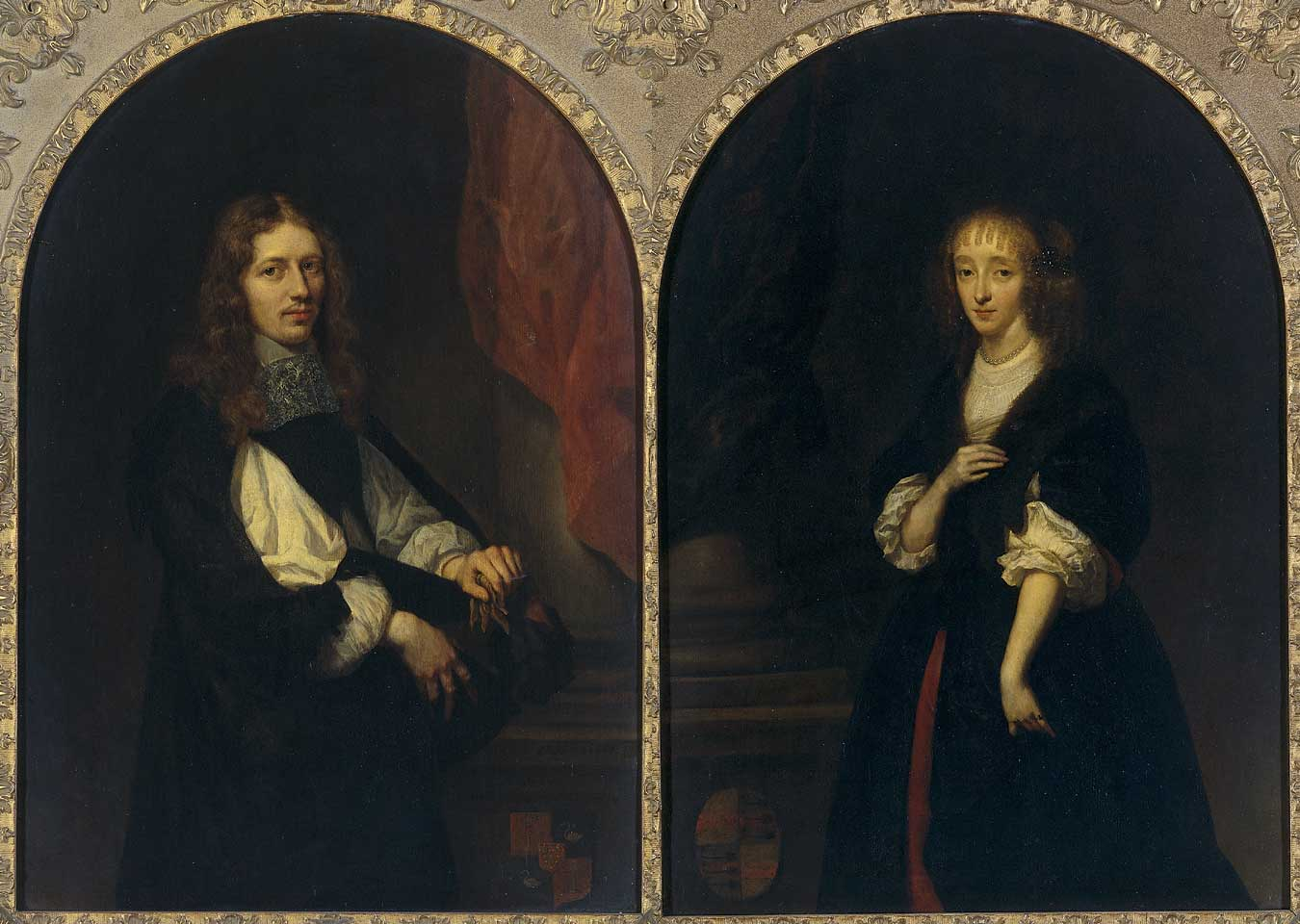
Portraits of Pieter de Graeff and Jacoba Bicker, painted in 1663 by Caspar Netscher, Rijksmuseum Amsterdam

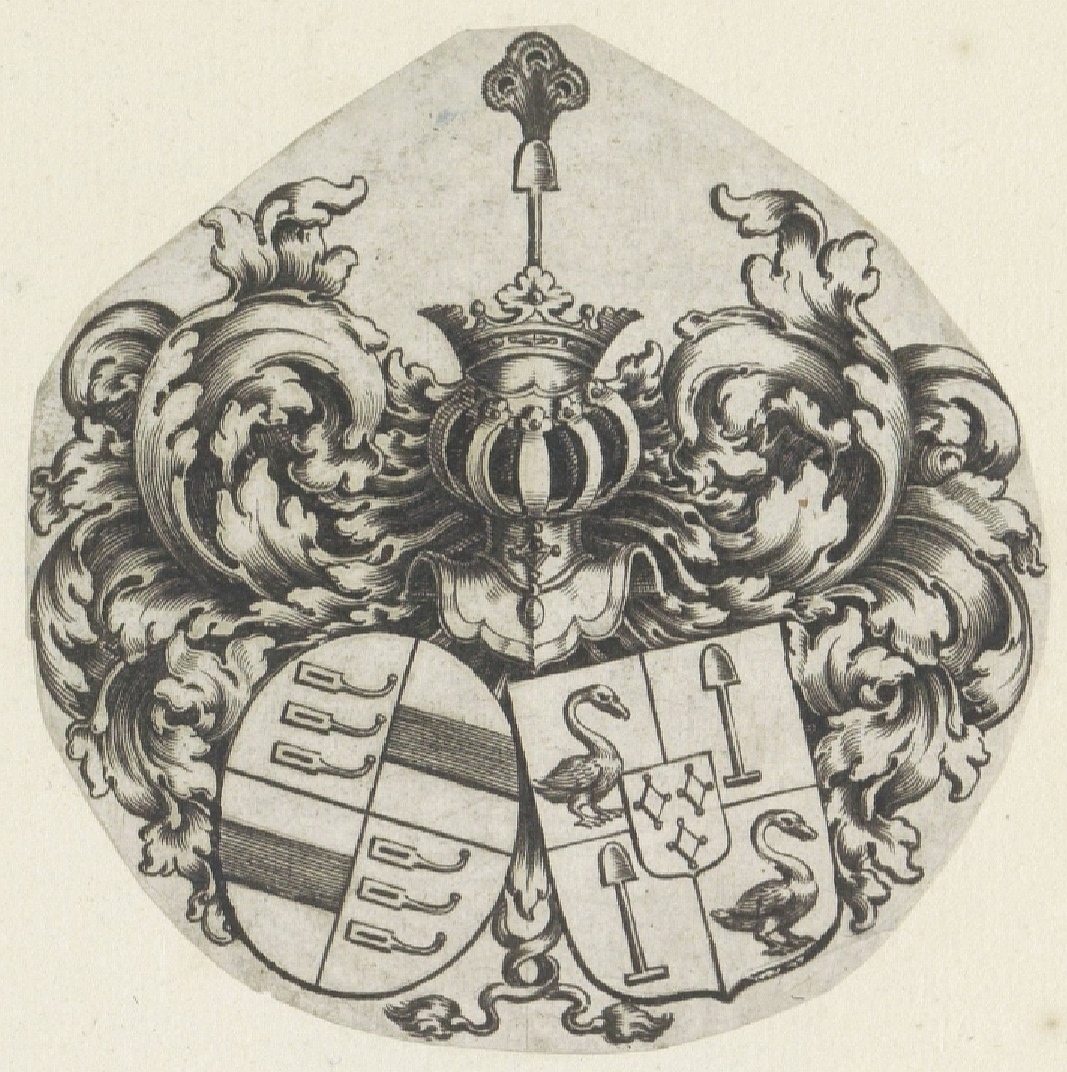
Marriage crest of Pieter de Graeff and Jacoba Bicker

The couple had three children:

- Agneta de Graeff (1663–1725) married Jan Baptiste de Hochepied II (1669–1709), deputy to the General Accounting Chamberlain. She owned the cityhouse "Korte Vijverberg 3" in The Hague, the current cabinet of the king and at her death she had a fortune of 867,000 guilders, of which she left 525,000 guilders to her cousin Gerard Bicker (II) van Swieten
- Cornelis de Graeff (1671–1719), Free Lord of Purmerland and Ilpendam, canon in the cathedral chapter of St. Pieter in Utrecht
- Johan de Graeff (1673–1714), Free Lord of Zuid-Polsbroek, Purmerland and Ilpendam, Amsterdam regent

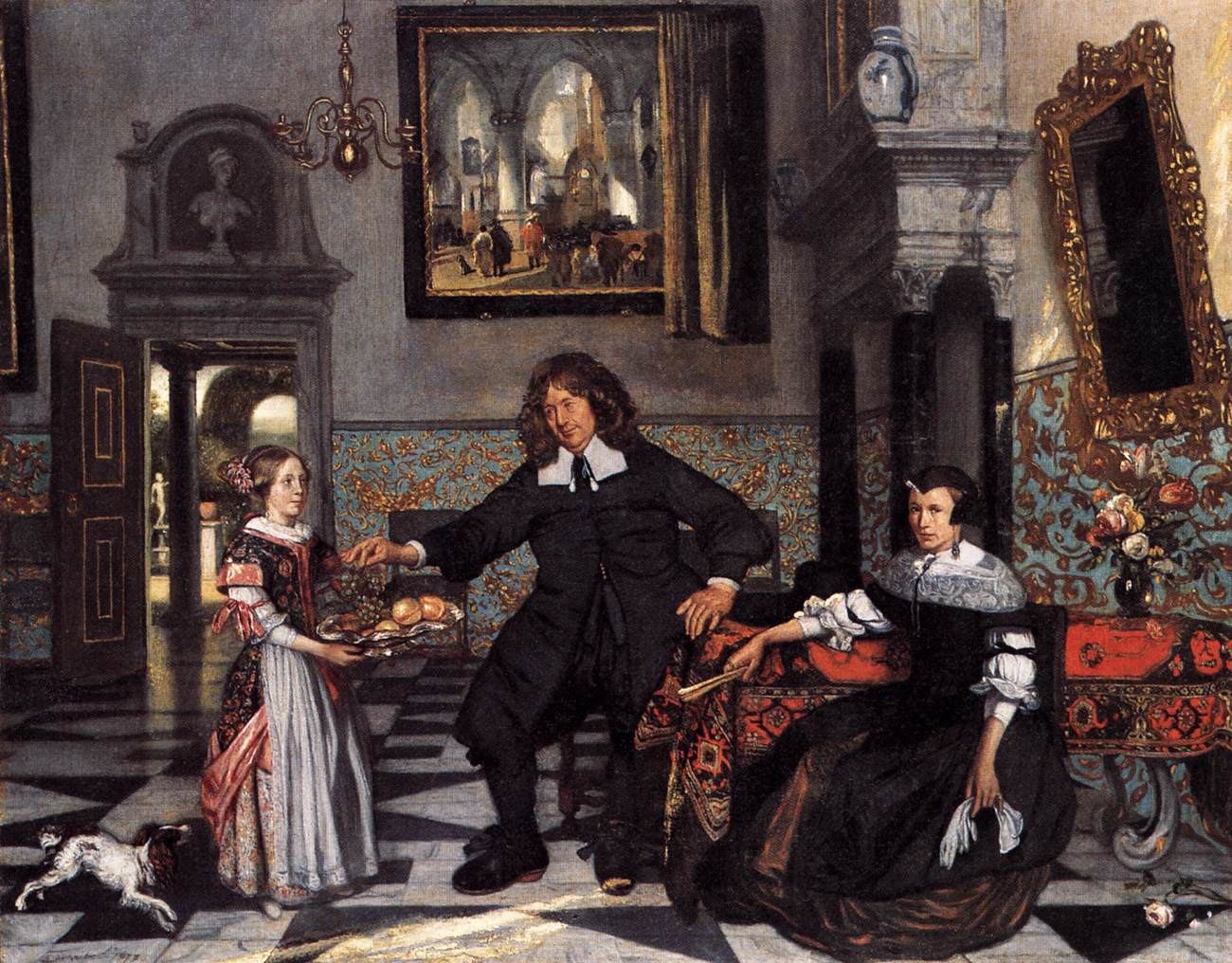
Portrait of the family of Pieter de Graeff (with wife Jacoba Bicker and daughter Agneta de Graeff) by Emanuel de Witte, 1678

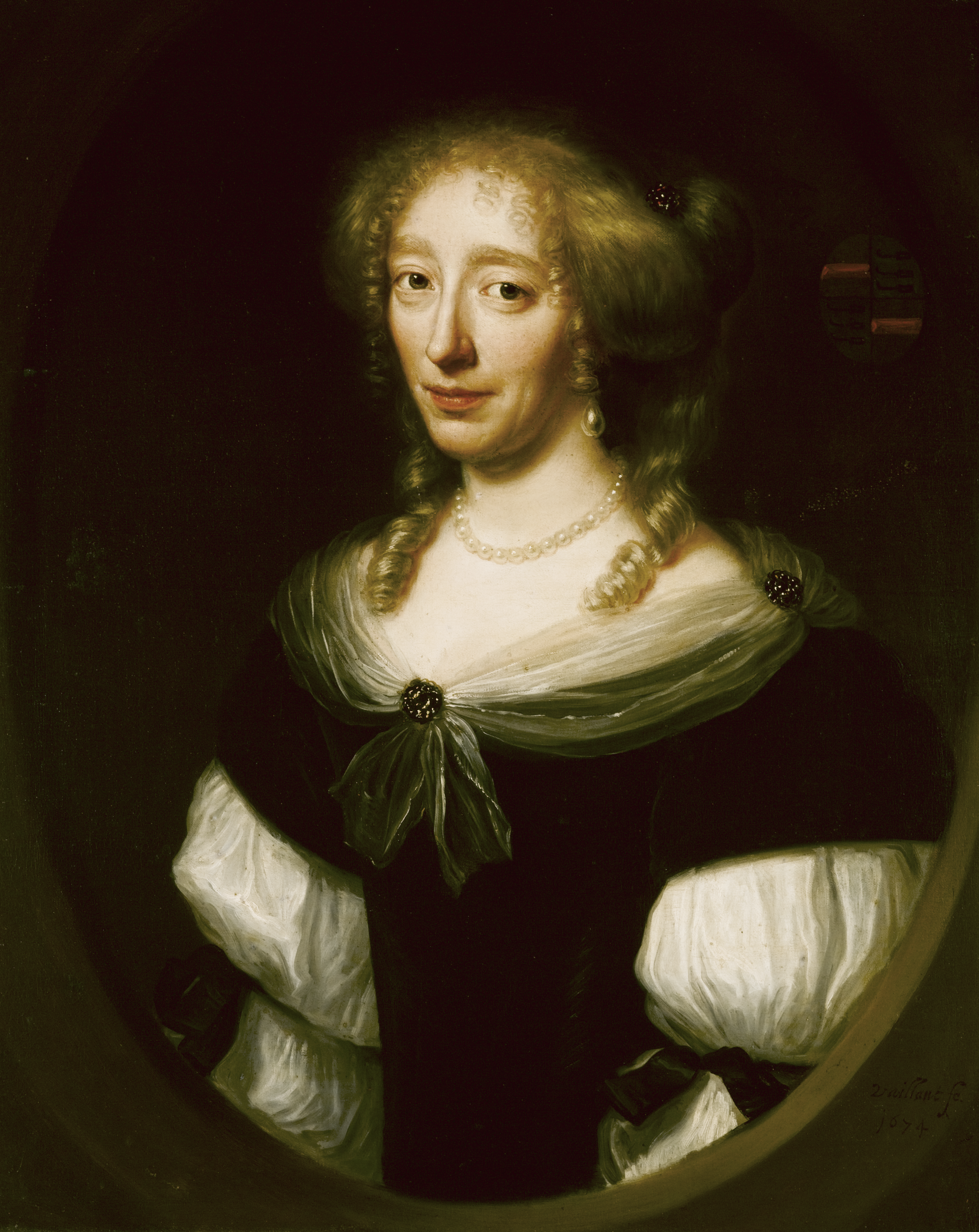
Jacoba Bicker painted by Wallerant Vaillant or one of his brothers in 1674

In 1663 Jacoba Bicker was painted together with her husband Pieter by Caspar Netscher and alone by Jurriaen Ovens. Wallerant Vaillant painted her in 1674 and Emanuel de Witte together with Pieter and daughter Agneta de Graeff in 1678. When her sister Wendela died in 1668, her husband Pieter and her brother-in-law Jean Deutz were appointed guardians of their nephews and nieces and were responsible for handling the estate. In 1695 Jacoba Bicker was one of the 250 richest persons from the Dutch Golden Age and was assessed for a taxable capital of 491,811 guilders.
