= Jacob de Witt =

Mayor of Dordrecht

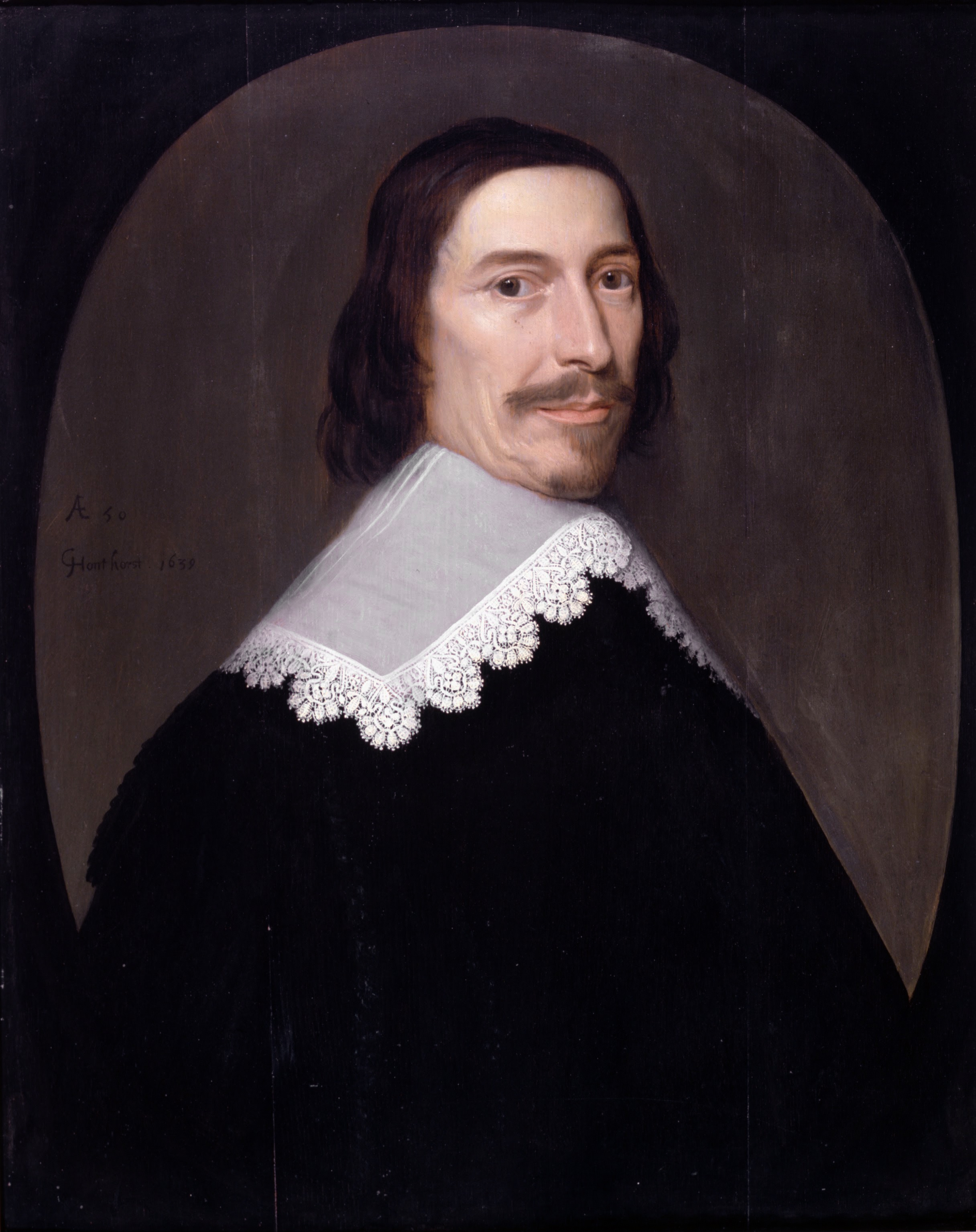
Portrait of Jacob de Witt by Gerard van Honthorst

Jacob de Witt, heer van Manezee, Melissant and Comstryen (7 February 1589 – 10 January 1674) was a burgomaster of Dordrecht and the son of a timber merchant. De Witt was an influential member of the Dutch States Party, and was in opposition to the House of Orange. He was also a younger brother of Andries de Witt and the father of Johan and Cornelis de Witt.

== Career ==
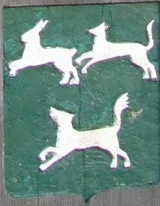
Family coat of arms

Jacob was born in Dordrecht and was a member of the patrician De Witt family. He studied law at Leiden University and obtained a law degree there. In 1618, he became treasurer of the Synod of Dort, where he held several positions in public service, serving as burgomaster six times. He also served as emissary to Sweden along with Andries Bicker; Jacob de Witt left after the Second Treaty of Brömsebro (1645).

He was a member of the States of Holland and an opponent of William II, Prince of Orange, stadtholder of Holland and four other provinces. Together with the republican-minded brothers Cornelis and Andries de Graeff and their cousins Cornelis and Andries Bicker, De Witt supported the Peace of Münster. In May 1650 they proposed to reduce the size of the army, which was opposed by William as commander of the army.

This dispute led to a coup by William, who tried to seize Amsterdam. On 30 June 1650, William arrested De Witt and the burgomasters of Delft, Hoorn, Medemblik, Haarlem, and Dordrecht (all prominent members of the States of Holland) at the Binnenhof in The Hague. They were imprisoned in Castle Loevestein. On 17 August they were released after having reversed the reduction of the army size.

== Death ==
In 1657 he moved to The Hague, but after the murder of his sons on 20 August 1672, on which he was brought to safety, he avoided The Hague, then spent a short time in Dordrecht where he died on 10 January 1674.
