= Van Swieten =

Van Swieten is a surname found in the Netherlands. Notable people with this surname include:

- Bartholda van Swieten (1566 – 1647), a Dutch noble and diplomat
- Cornelis Bicker van Swieten (1592 – 1654), a Dutch historical figure
- Gerard van Swieten (1700 – 1772), a Dutch physician
- Gerard Bicker (I) van Swieten (1632 – 1716), a Dutch aristocrat
- Gottfried van Swieten (1733 – 1803), a Dutch-Austrian diplomat, librarian, and music patron
- Jan van Swieten (1807 – 1888), a Dutch general and politician
