= Johan de Witt Jr. =

Dutch politician

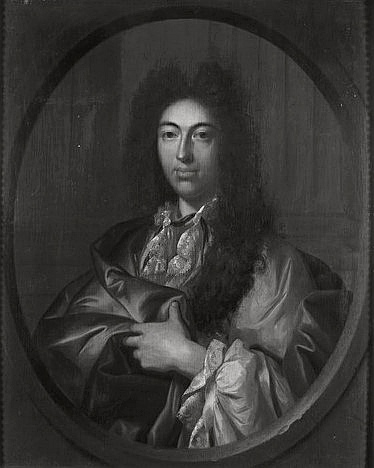
Johan de Witt

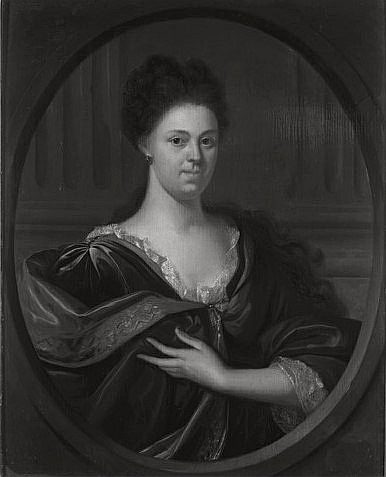
Wilhelmina de Witt

Johan de Witt Jr., heer van Zuid- en Noord-Linschoten, Snelrewaard, Hekendorp and IJsselveere (27 May 1662 in The Hague – 24 January 1701 at Dordrecht) was a Dutch politician, scholar, and collector.

== Biography ==
Johan Jr. was the son of Johan de Witt and his wife Wendela Bicker (1635–1668). As a member of the old Dutch patrician De Witt family, De Witt took a seat as secretary of the city of Dordrecht. After the early death of his mother, his relatives, Gerard Bicker (I) van Swieten and Catherine van Sijpesteijn, who lived in the same house, also looked after their nephews and nieces. His two other uncles, Jean Deutz and Pieter de Graeff, became guardians and were responsible for handling the maternal estate.

In Rampjaar 1672, after the murder of his father, De Graeff became the guardian of Johan and his siblings. Johan de Witt Jr. later became the overseer of the orphanage in Dordrecht (1684–1685). After that he became secretary (1688–1701) and member of the College of Forty (1695) of Dordrecht.

Johan de Witt married his cousin Wilhelmina de Witt (1671–1701), the daughter of his uncle Cornelis de Witt (1623–1672) en Maria van Berckel (1632–1706). The couple had two children:

- Johan (1694–1751), who inherited his father's property and sold them in 1723 to Jan Hendrik Strick van Linschoten.
- Cornelis de Witt (1696–1769), Burgomaster of Dordrecht and vrijheer of Jaarsveld.

Johan de Witt owned an extensive library, consisting of books that previously belonged to his father as well as additions of his own.
