= Andries de Witt =

Grand Pensionary of Holland

Andries de Witt (16 June 1573, in Dordrecht – 26 November 1637, in Dordrecht) was Grand Pensionary of Holland between 1619 and 1621.

== Biography ==
Andries de Witt was a member of the old Dutch patrician family De Witt. He was the oldest son of Cornelis Fransz de Witt (1545–1622), 16-fold burgomaster of Dordrecht and Johanna Heijmans. He was the uncle of Cornelis de Witt and Johan de Witt, Grand Pensionary from 1652 to 1672, who were sons of his youngest brother Jacob de Witt. Andries married Elizabeth van den Honert in 1604, with whom he had 10 children.

De Witt studied law at the University Leiden, traveled to Germany, Switzerland, France and England for several years, and then held various offices in Dordrecht, finally that of Pensionary. In the dispute between the governor Maurice, Prince of Orange and the provincial advocate Johan van Oldenbarnevelt, he sided with Moritz. After the arrest of Oldenbarnevelt in 1618 he managed the business of this office on a deputy basis until 1621 Anthonie Duyck was elected Oldenbarnevelt's successor. As a Grand Pensionariy he was the successor of Johan van Oldebarnevelt, who had been executed in 1619. As a Grand Pensionary De Witt acted without initiative, without his own influence on either internal or external business. He limited himself to carrying out orders given to him by Maurice of Orange.

From 1620 until his death, De Witt was a councilor in the Dutch court

== Sources ==
- Van der Aa, Van Harderwijk & Schotel Biographical dictionary of the Netherlands (1877), page 361. (Dutch)
- Andries de Witt at "Allgemeine Deutsche Biografie" (german)

Political offices
Preceded by Johan van Oldenbarnevelt as Land's Advocate	Grand Pensionary of Holland; 1619–1621	Succeeded by Anthonie Duyck
