= De Witte family =

De Witte
- Current region: Belgium and France
- Origin: Antwerp, Belgium
- Members: Adriaan de Witte; Jacob Antoon de Witte; Jean de Witte; Gaston-François de Witte

The de Witte family is a Belgian noble family originating in the city of Antwerp.

== History ==
Originally, it is believed that they were members of the Hanseatic League. The oldest known family ancestor is Adriaan de Witte (1464–1549), who was from Buerstede near Antwerp. A 1544 portrait of him, painted by a student of Hans Holbein the Younger, is exhibited in the Rijksmuseum Twenthe in Enschede.

== Selected members ==
- Adriaan de Witte, also known as Adrien de Witte (1464–1549)
- Jacob Antoon de Witte, also known as Jacques-Antoine de Witte (1629–1688)
- Jean de Witte (1808–1889) – an archaeologist, epigraphist and numismatist
- Gaston-François de Witte (1897–1980) – an herpetologist
