= Baan (surname) =

Baan is a Dutch surname with a variety of origins. Variant forms are Baans, Baen, De Baan, De Baen and Van der Baan. It can be patronymic, where Baan or Bane may be, among others, a short form of Urbanus. Alternatively, given that Dutch baan can mean "lane" or "track", it may be a toponymic or metonymic occupational surname, referring e.g. to a kaatser or road maker. People with this name include:

== Baan ==
- David Baan (1908–1984), Dutch boxer
- Fiona Baan (1938–1994), Scottish-born American sports administrator
- Iwan Baan (born 1975), Dutch photographer
- Jan Baan (born 1946), Dutch entrepreneur and venture capitalist, brother of Paul
- Paul Baan (born 1951), Dutch entrepreneur and venture capitalist, brother of Jan
  - Baan Corporation, software company founded by Jan and Paul Baan
- Pieter Baan (1912–1975), Dutch forensic psychiater, namesake of the Pieter Baan Centre
- Rob Baan (born 1943), Dutch football coach

== Baans ==
- Madelon Baans (born 1977), Dutch breaststroke swimmer

== Baen ==
- Jim Baen (1943–2006), American science fiction publisher and editor (Baen Books)

== De Baan and De Baen ==
- Jan de Baan or de Baen (1633–1702), Dutch portrait painter
- Jacobus de Baan or de Baen (1673–1700), Dutch portrait painter, son of Jan

== See also ==
- Baan (disambiguation)
- Huda al-Baan (born ca. 1960), Yemeni politician
- László Baán (born 1961), Hungarian economist and museum curator
- Willem-Alexander Baan, an artificial rowing lake in the Netherlands
