= Baan =

Baan may refer to:

== People ==
- Baan (surname), a Dutch surname, including a list of people with the name
- Huda al-Baan (born 1960), Yemeni politician
- László Baán (born 1961), Hungarian economist and museum curator

== Other uses ==
- Baan Corporation, a Dutch software company 1978–2003
- Baan language, an Ogoni language of Nigeria
- Baan theatre, a theater in Assam, India
- Baan, a hamlet in Altena, North Brabant, Netherlands
- Bâan: The Boundary of Adulthood, a 2025 Japanese anime short film

== See also ==
- The dictionary definition of ບ້ານ at Wiktionary (Lao, baan 'village')
- The dictionary definition of บ้าง at Wiktionary (Thai, ban 'some')
