= The Corpses of the De Witt Brothers =

Painting by Jan de Baen

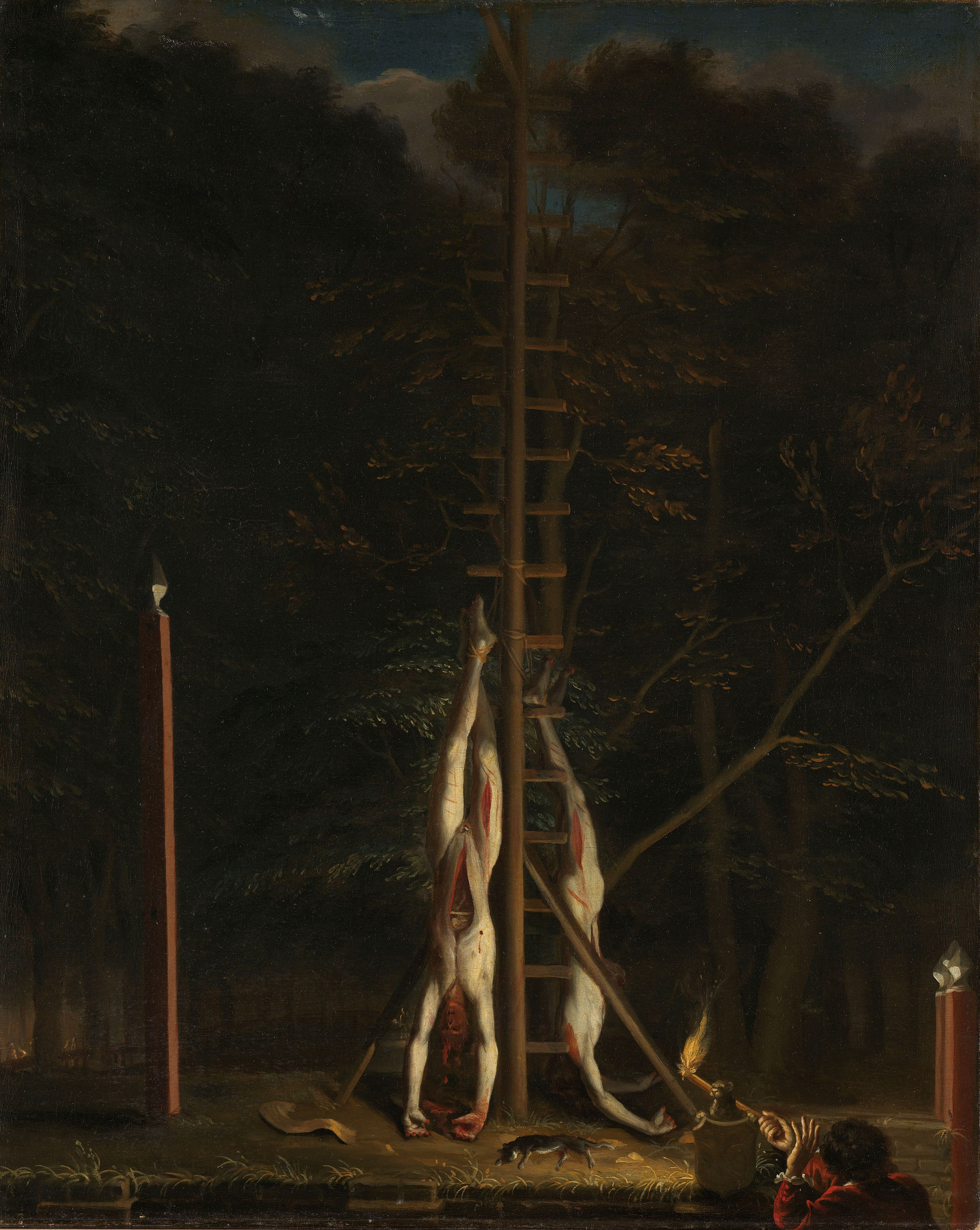
- Artist: Jan de Baen
- Year: Between 1672 (event) and 1675
- Medium: Oil on canvas
- Dimensions: 69.5 cm × 56 cm (27.4 in × 22 in)
- Location: Rijksmuseum; Amsterdam

The Corpses of the De Witt Brothers is a c. 1672–75 oil on canvas painting by the Dutch Golden Age painter Jan de Baen, now in the Rijksmuseum in Amsterdam. It shows the dead and mutilated bodies of the brothers Johan and Cornelis de Witt hanging upside down on the Groene Zoodje, the place of execution in front of the Gevangenpoort in The Hague.

== Subject ==
The two de Witt brothers, opponents of the House of Orange, had dominated Dutch politics for some years, but left the country unprepared for the invasion by Louis XIV of France in 1672, the infamous Rampjaar. Their killing, which took place on 20 August 1672, was an act of aggression of a furious local mob, supporters of the 22 year old William of Orange, the future William III of England, who had just been appointed stadtholder and commander-in-chief of the army and navy by the political opponents of Johan. On August 4 Johan had agreed to his forced resignation from his position as Grand Pensionary of Holland, i.e. the Secretary of the government. Then his brother Cornelis was accused of treason and arrested. The verdict at his trial was exile. Johan went to the jail from their house nearby to take him home for the time being. The burgerwacht, the local militia, gathered with a mob, angry at the mild verdict, and both brothers were lynched at the gate of the Gevangenispoort.

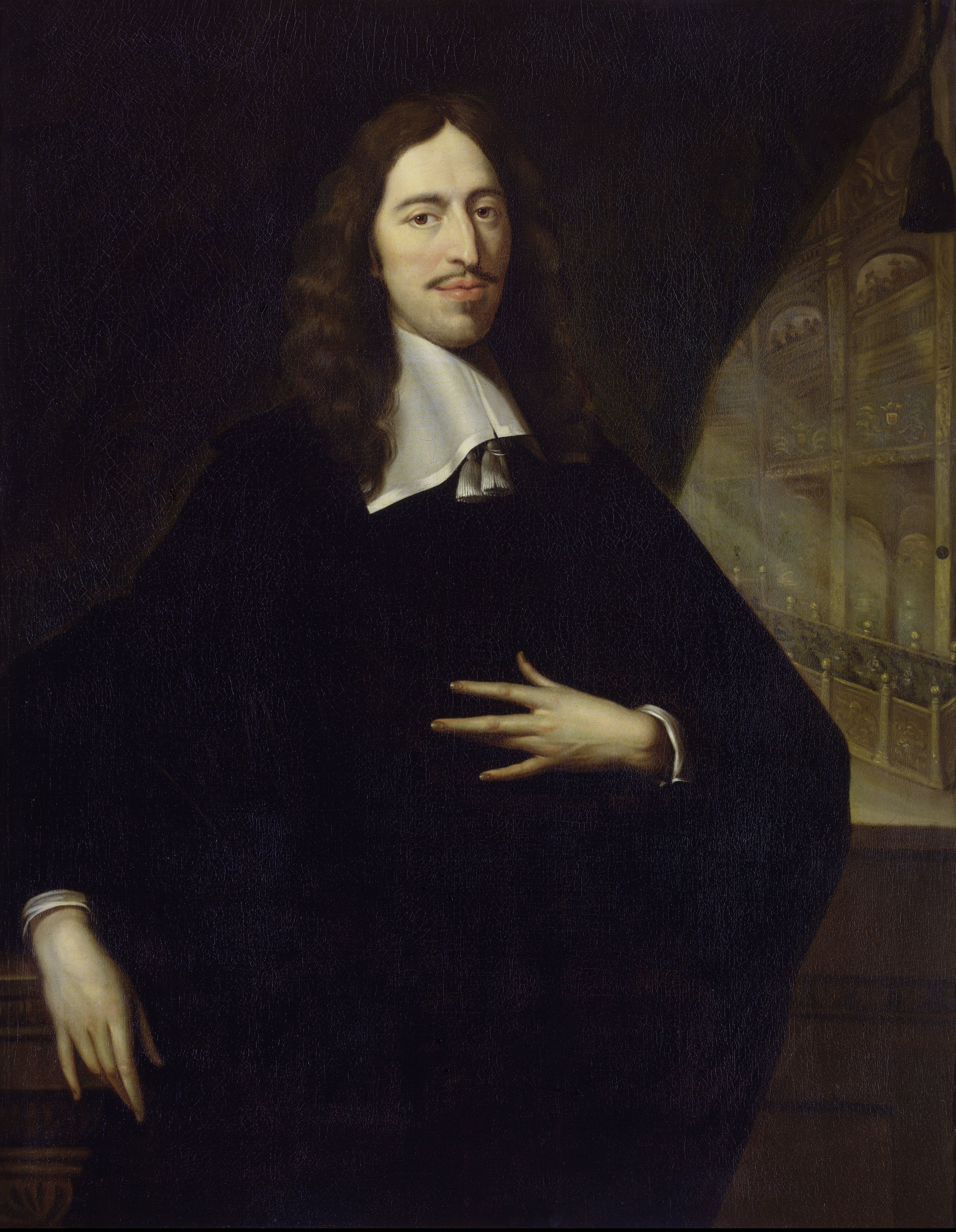
Johan, copy of portrait by de Baen

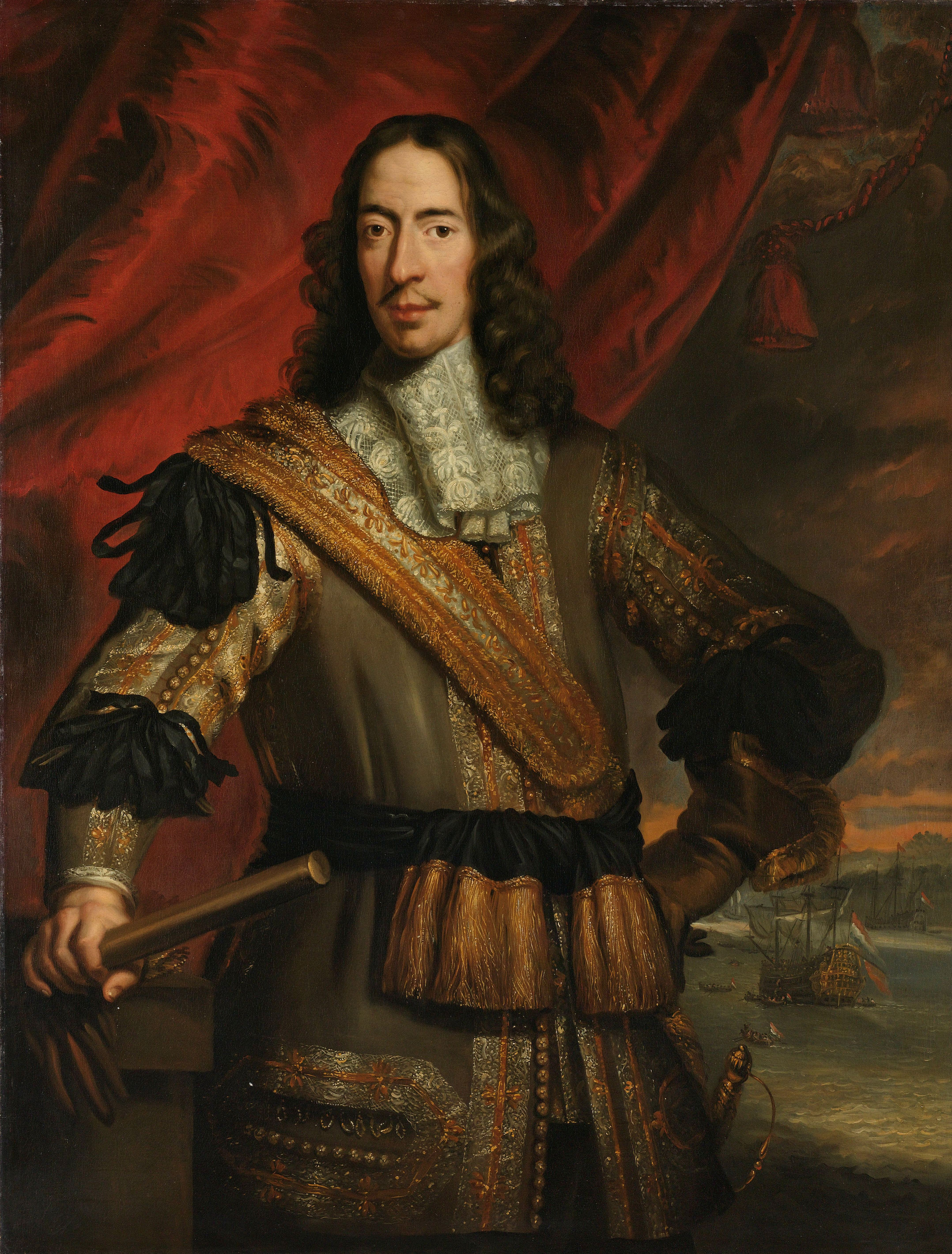
Cornelis, copy of portrait by de Baen

== Artist ==
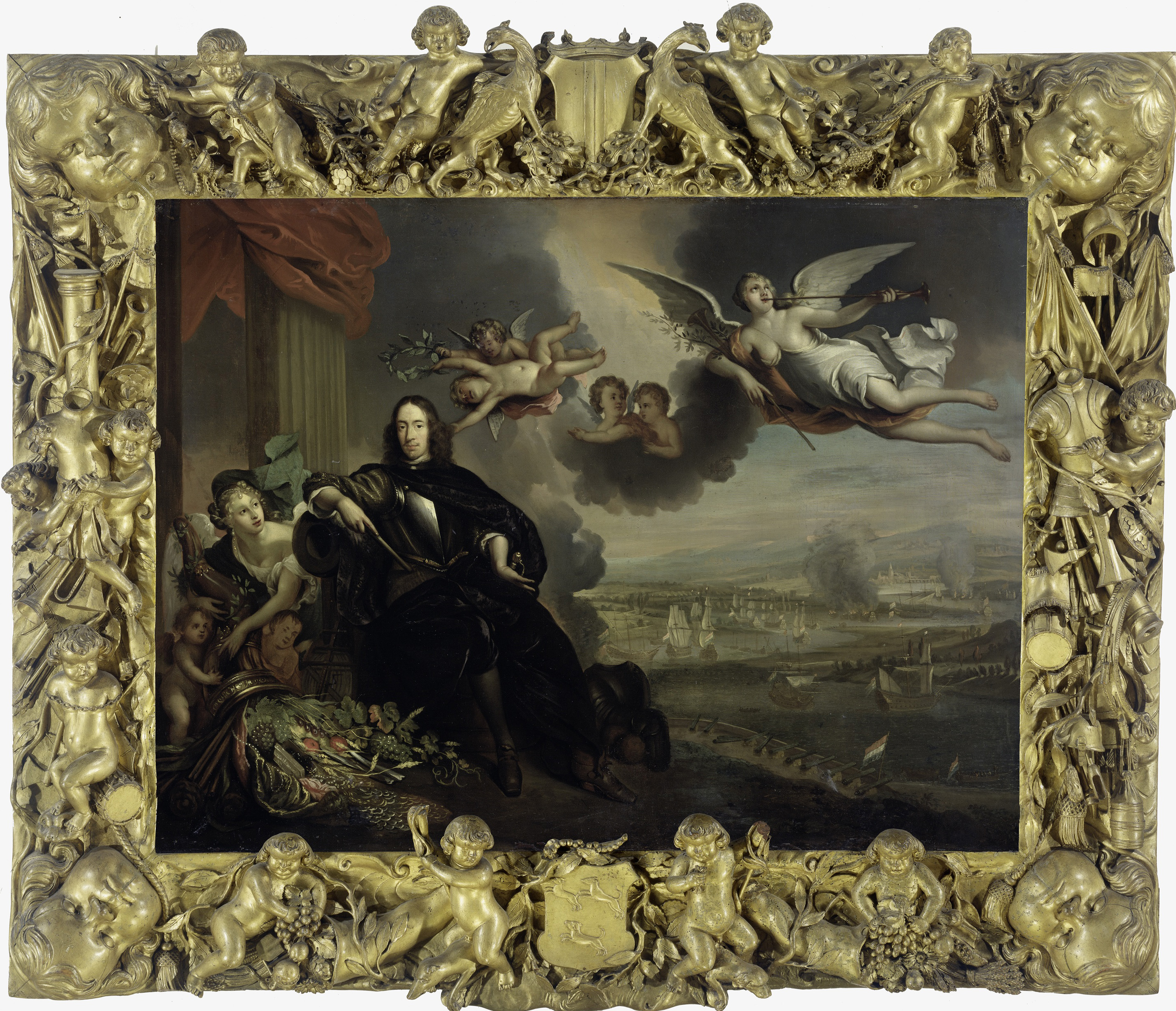
Modello for Jan de Baen's painting in the Dordrecht City Hall

De Baen, a leading portraitist based in The Hague, had also painted individual portraits of both brothers, and The Apotheosis of Cornelis de Witt, with the Dutch Raid on the Medway in the background, which had been commissioned by the Dordrecht City Hall, because Cornelis de Witt first became mayor in 1650. In 1667 he had supervised the Raid on the Medway, which had been celebrated as a great victory and which had been planned by his brother Johan. The city hall painting in Dordrecht was destroyed at the same time as the mob in The Hague lynched the brothers, such was the state of the country in the rampjaar. The modello was purchased by Alexander Gogel in 1806, followed by copies of Jan de Baen's portraits of the brothers in 1808.

== Provenance and other depictions ==
This painting has been considered a highlight of the national history collection since it was bought in 1802 by Alexander Gogel for the high price of nearly 1000 guilders and has been on show ever since, though mostly only displayed in rooms with anatomy scenes out of respect for the effect it may have on casual visitors. It was purchased for the National Kunst Galerie in the Hague, against the advice of Cornelis Sebille Roos, who felt it should be covered with a curtain. The same subject was a popular print by Roelant Roghman, and Roos also claimed it was a copy after a print and not by Frans van Mieris as the seller had advertised. It was reattributed to Jan de Baen soon after the purchase.

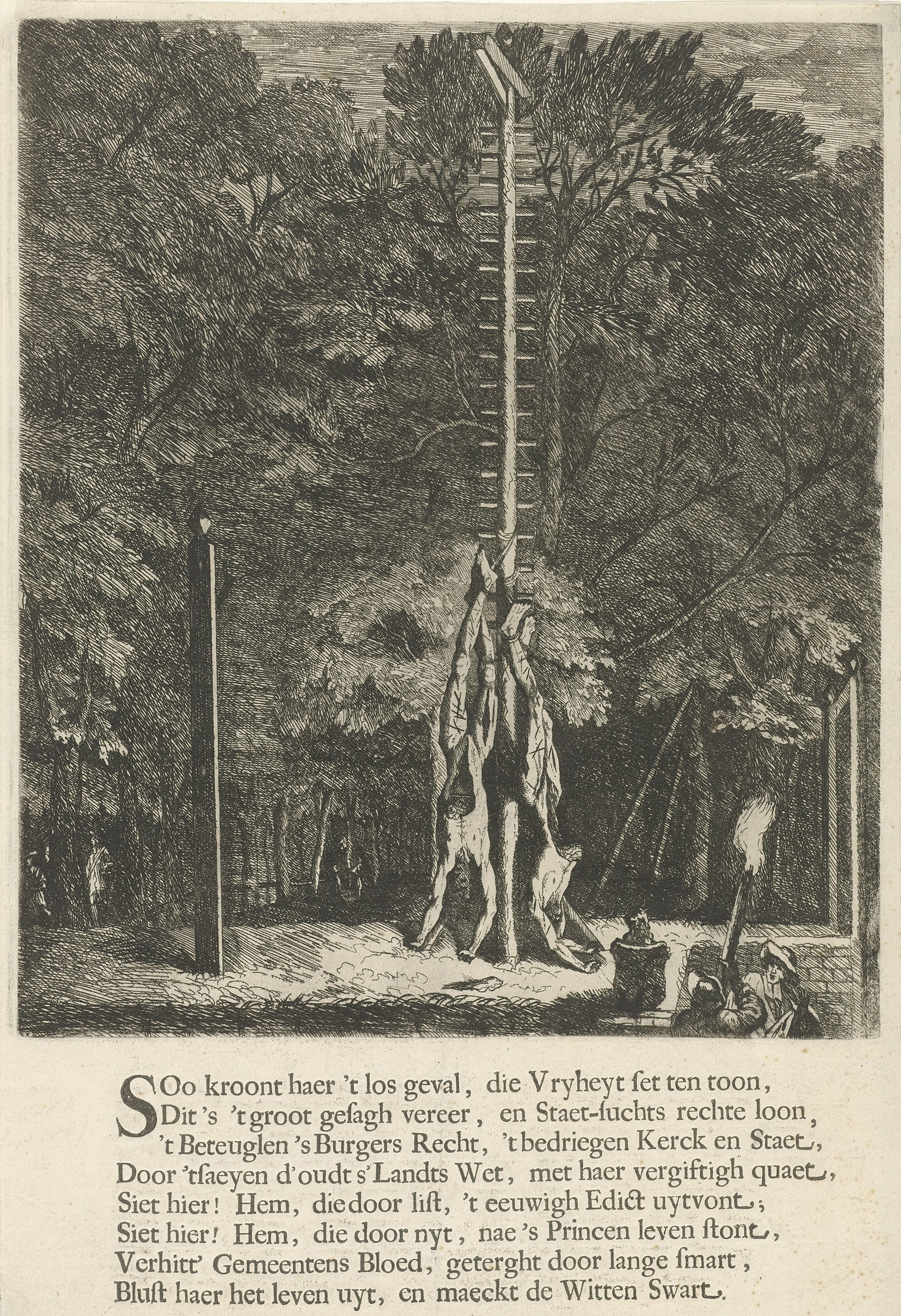
Print by Roghman

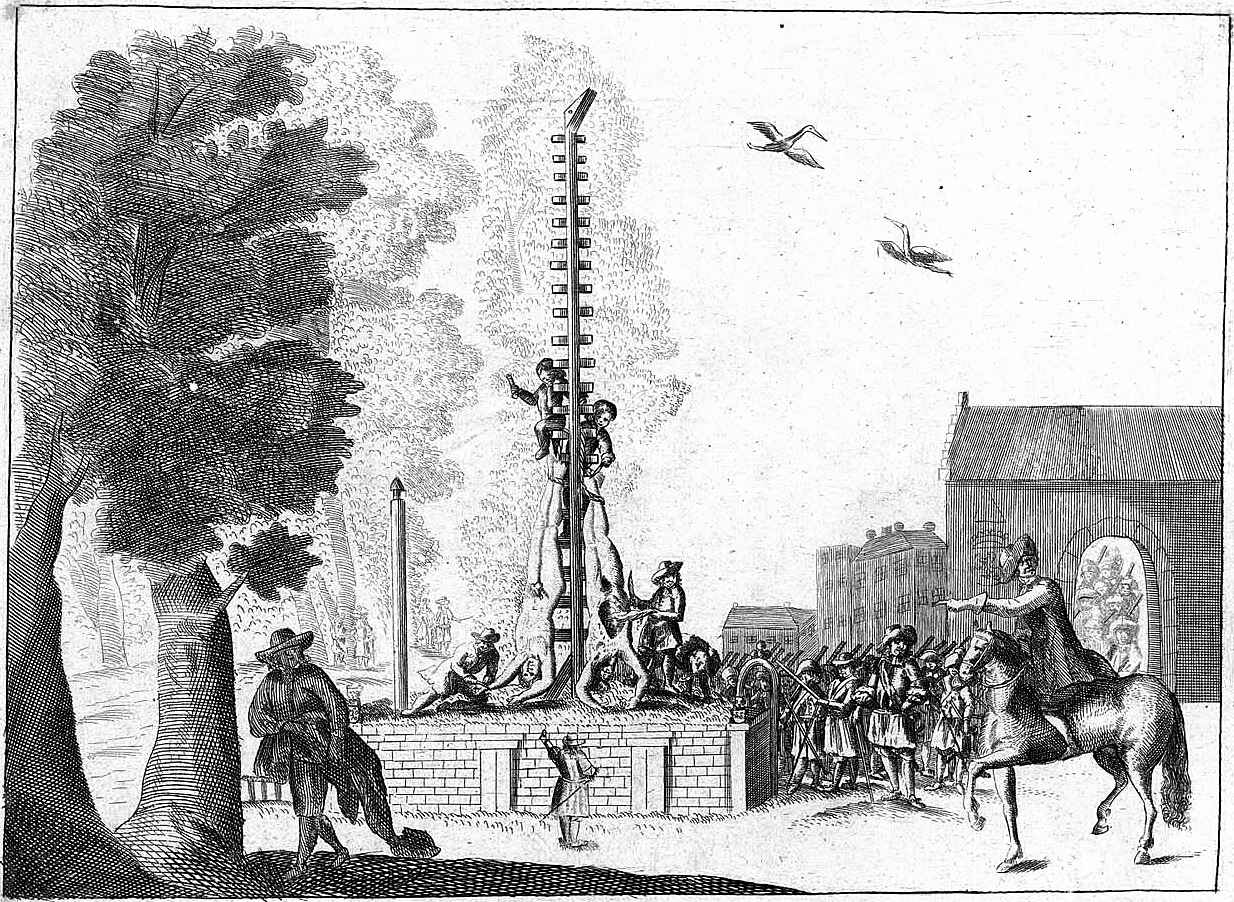
Anonymous print

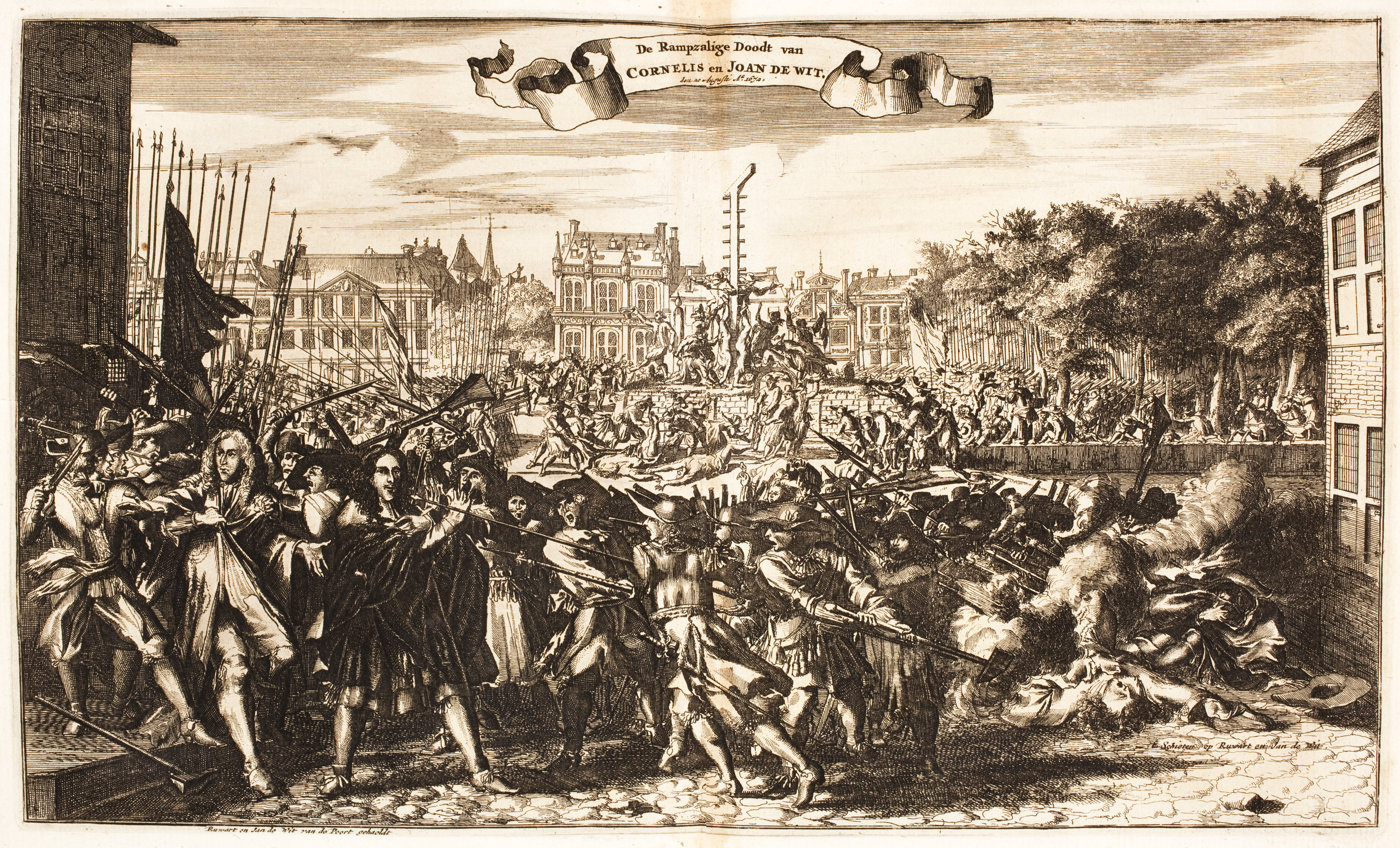
Anonymous print

The 2015 Dutch film Admiral dramatizes the lynching of Cornelis (Roeland Fernhout) and Johan De Witt (Barry Atsma), and de Baen himself is later shown immortalizing the brothers' gruesome deaths.
