= Gevangenpoort =

Former gate and medieval prison

Coordinates: 52.446°N 4.1837°E

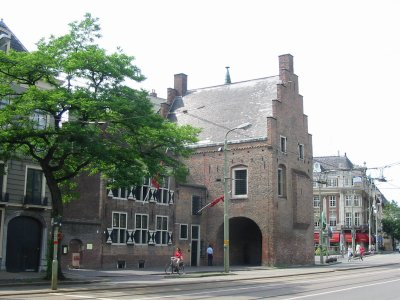
The Gevangenpoort in 2003 with the old entrance.

The Gevangenpoort (Prisoner's Gate) is a former gate and medieval prison on the Buitenhof in The Hague, Netherlands. It is situated next to the 18th-century art gallery founded by William V, Prince of Orange in 1774 known as the Prince William V Gallery.

== History of the prison ==
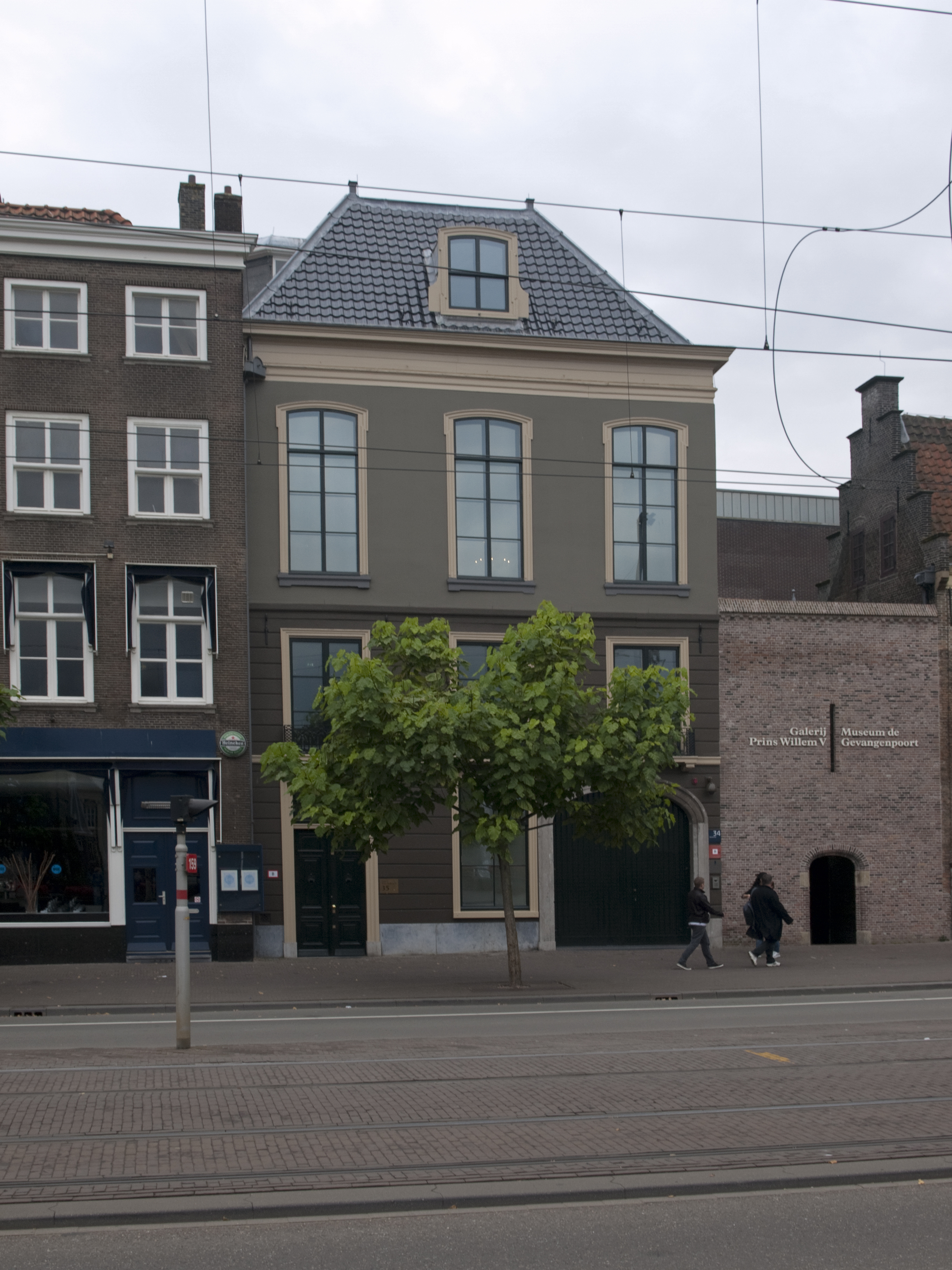
The new entrance to both the Galerij Prins Willem V and the Museum Gevangenpoort

From 1420 until 1828, the prison was used to house people accused of serious crimes while they awaited sentencing.

Its most famous prisoner was Cornelis de Witt, who was held on the charge of plotting the murder of the stadtholder. He was lynched together with his brother Johan on 20 August 1672 on the square in front of the building called groene zoodje after the grass mat used for the scaffold. When public executions went out of fashion the area was used to build the "Witte Society", a literature club that still exists today, but had to move when the street was built in 1923.

In 1882, the Gevangenpoort became a prison museum. The "gate" function was lost in 1923 when the houses adjoining the Hofvijver were taken down to build the street that now allows busy traffic, including trams.

== Art Gallery ==
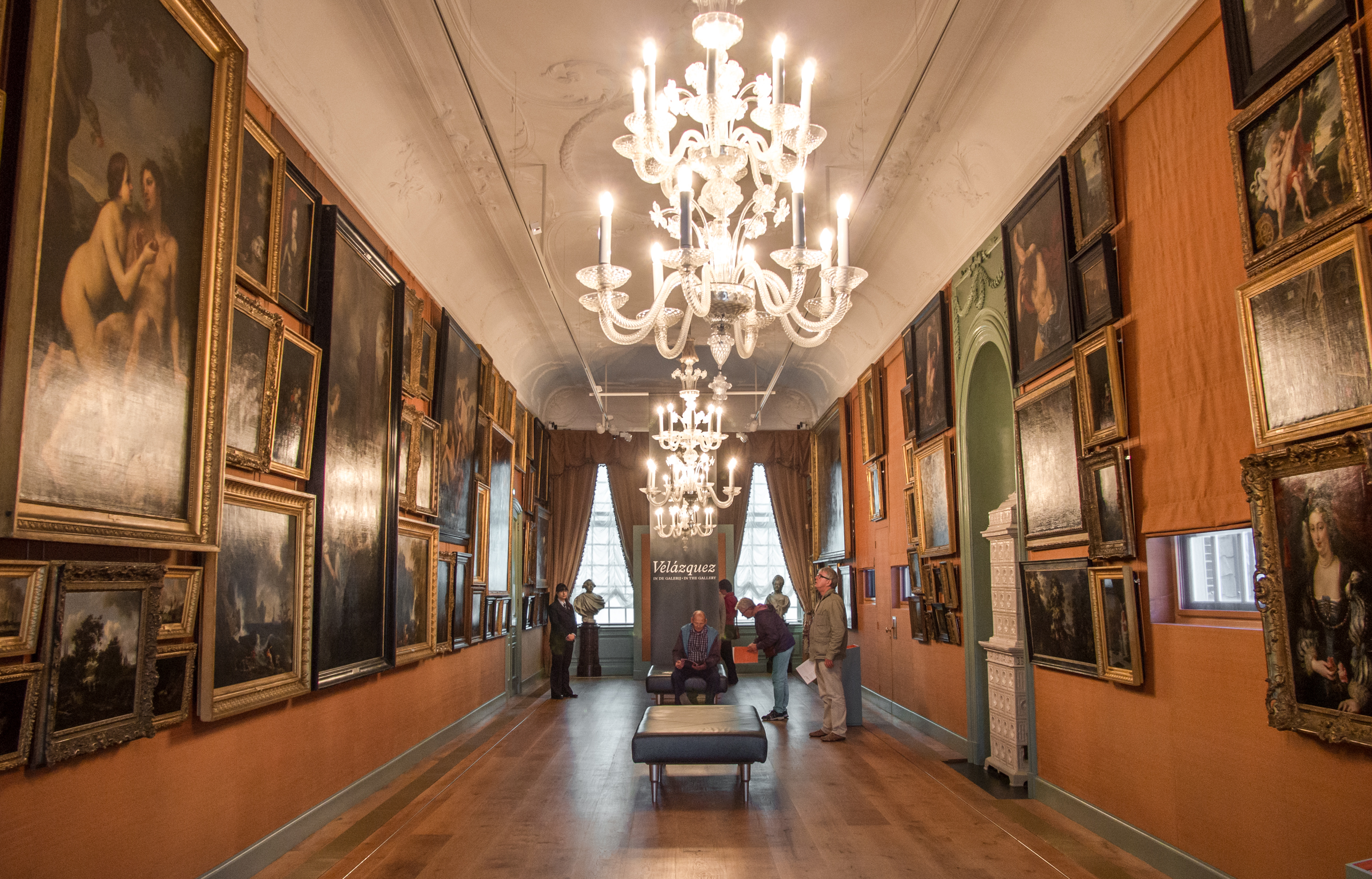
The interior of the 'Galerij Prins Willem V'

Since 2010, museum visitors can view the restored art gallery that can be reached through a special staircase that connects the two buildings. The collection which hangs here is a modern reconstruction of the original 1774 art cabinet that was situated upstairs above the fencing school. The paintings are again upstairs, hanging crowded together on the walls in the style of the late 18th century. In 1822 the collection (then called Koninklijk Kabinet van Schilderijen te 's-Gravenhage) was moved to the Mauritshuis which remains the formal owner of the paintings on display. During restoration activities, highlights of the permanent Mauritshuis collection have been temporarily displayed in the gallery.

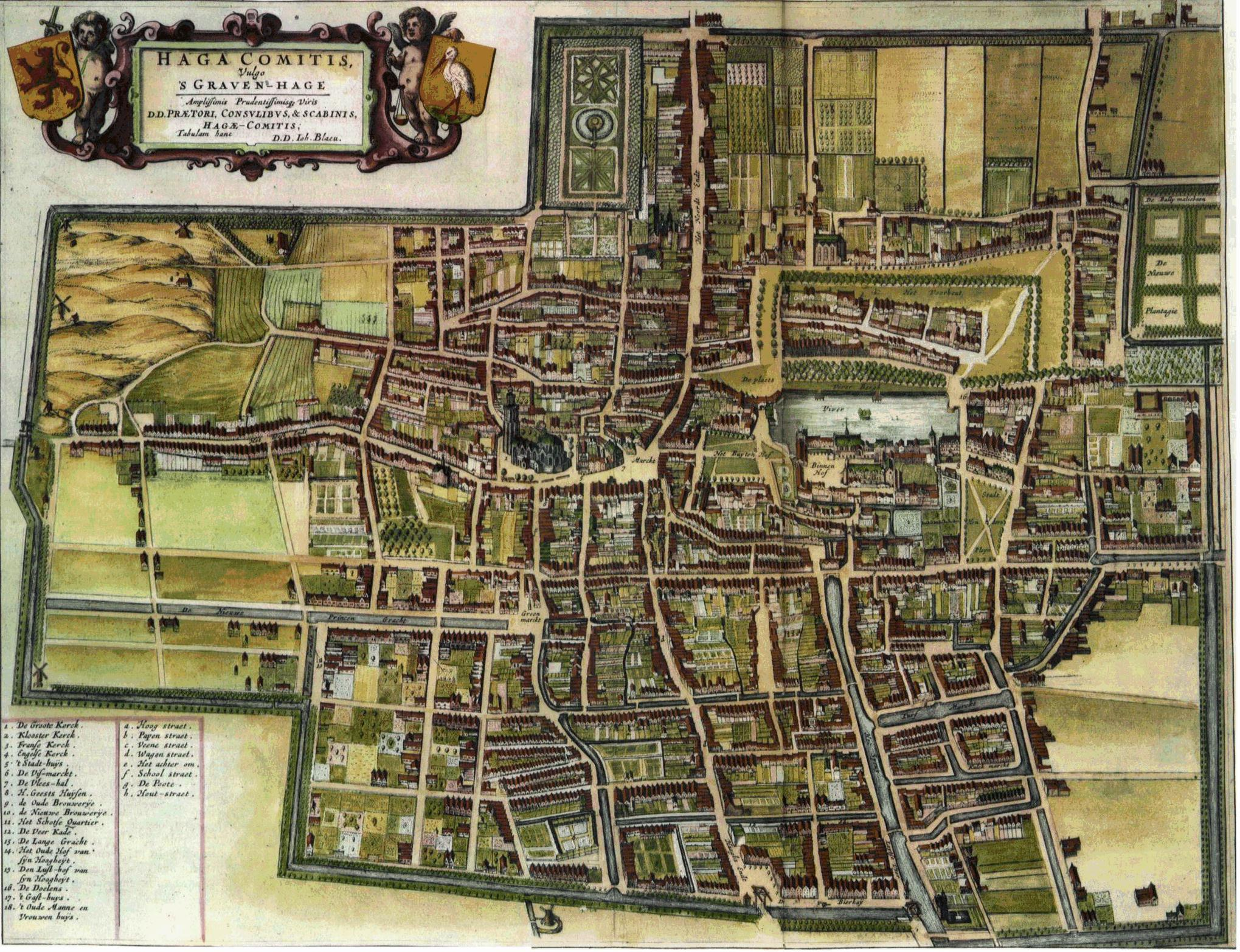
On this map by Joan Blaeu from 1652, the gate can be seen adjoining the Hofvijver.

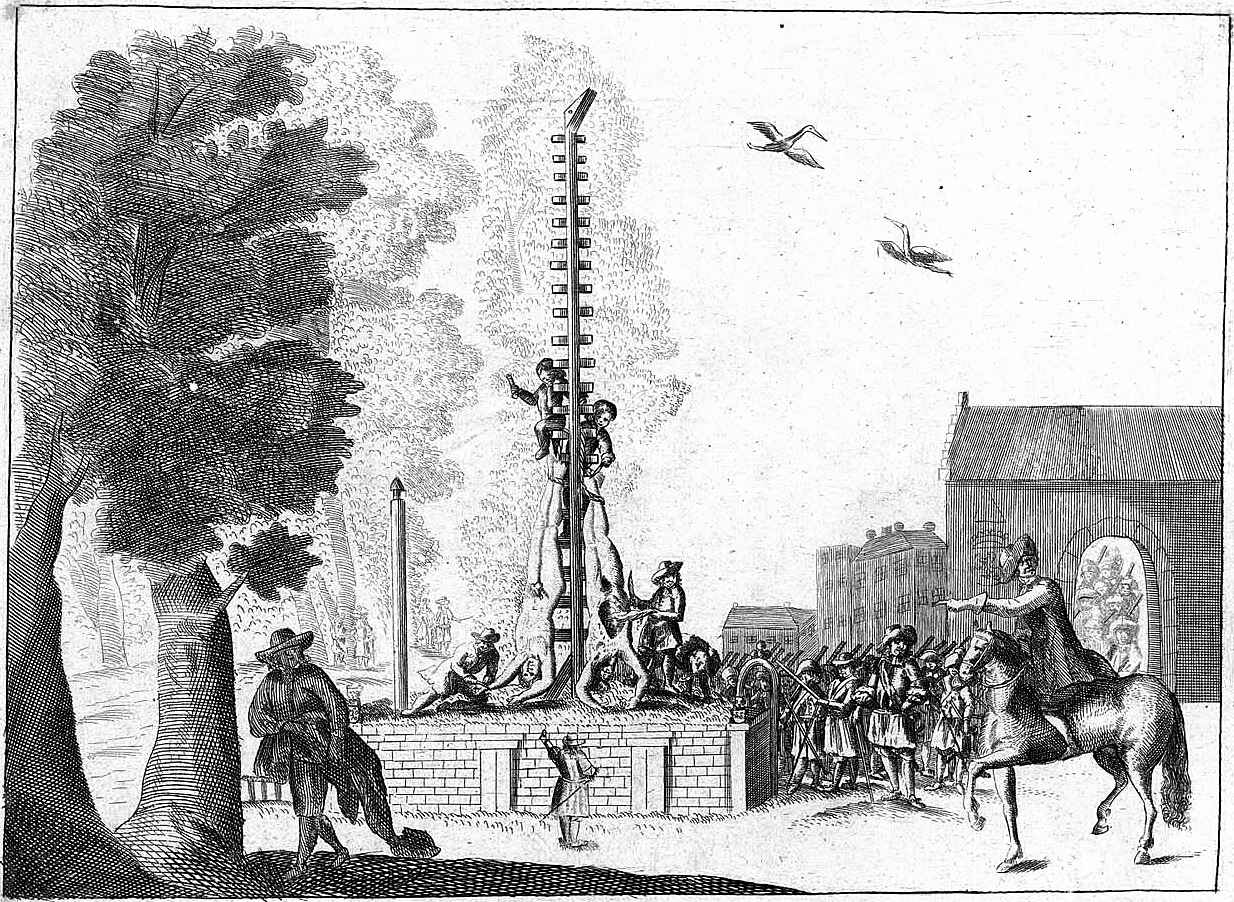
The De Witt brothers on the "Groene Zoodje".

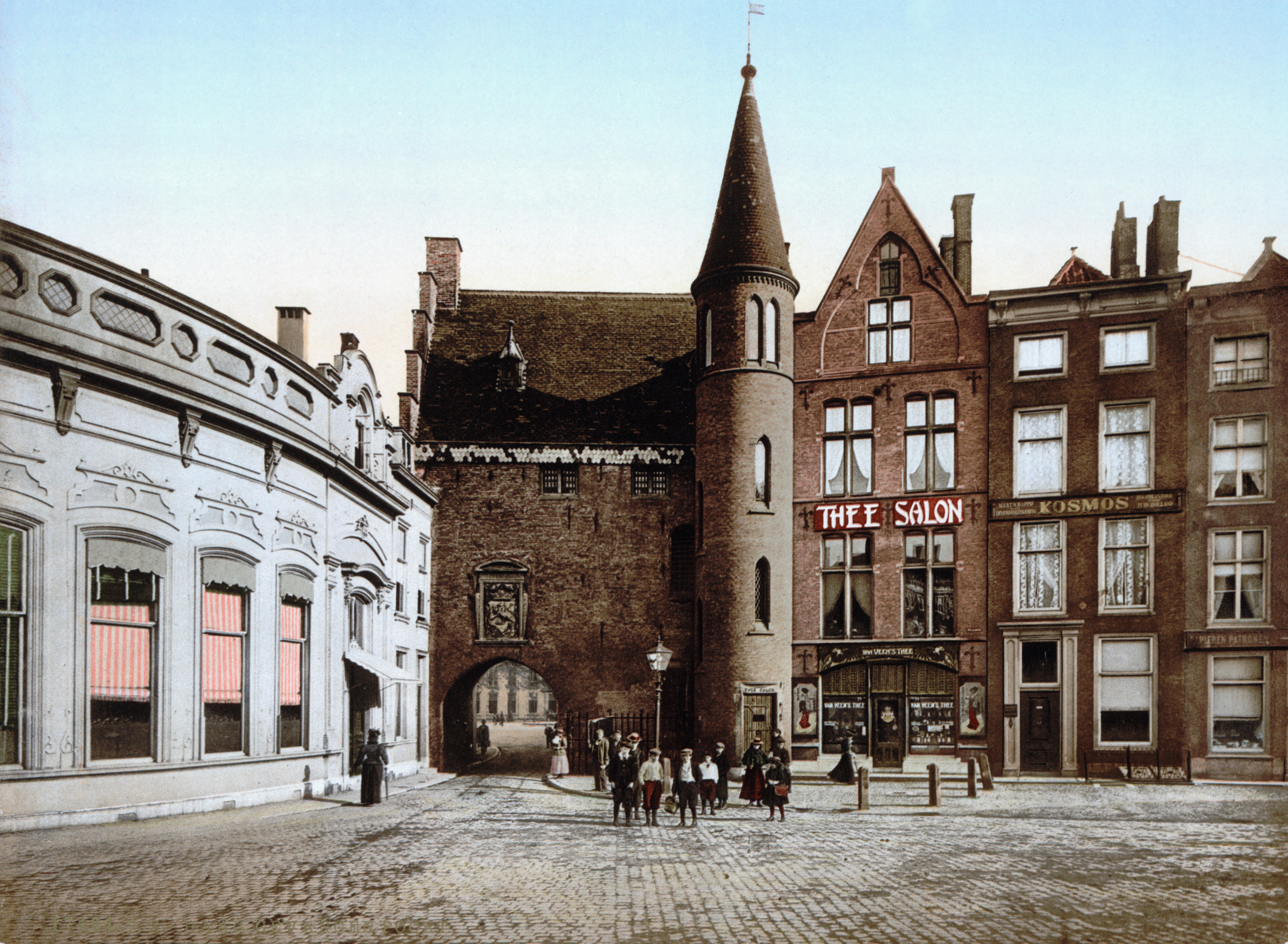
The gate in 1900, with the "Society" building on the left overlooking the Hofvijver

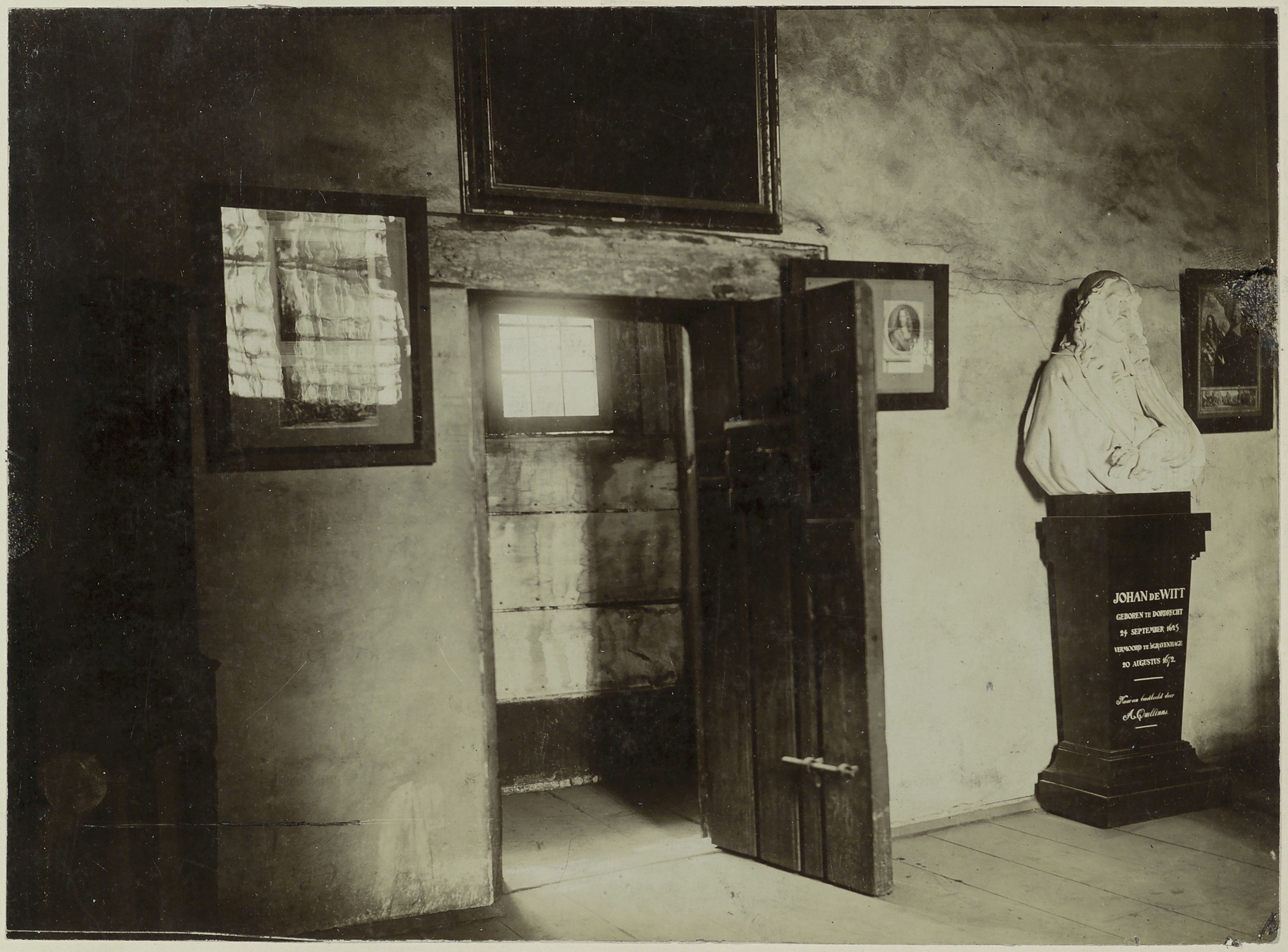
Former room of the museum with a bust of Johan de Witt before restoration

The gate was a border between the "binnenhof" (inner court) and "buitenhof" (outer court). The gate proved much too small in later times to let traffic pass safely, and the decision was made in the early 20th century to fill in a part of the Hofvijver and build a new road. The old gate function can be still seen in paintings and early photographs.

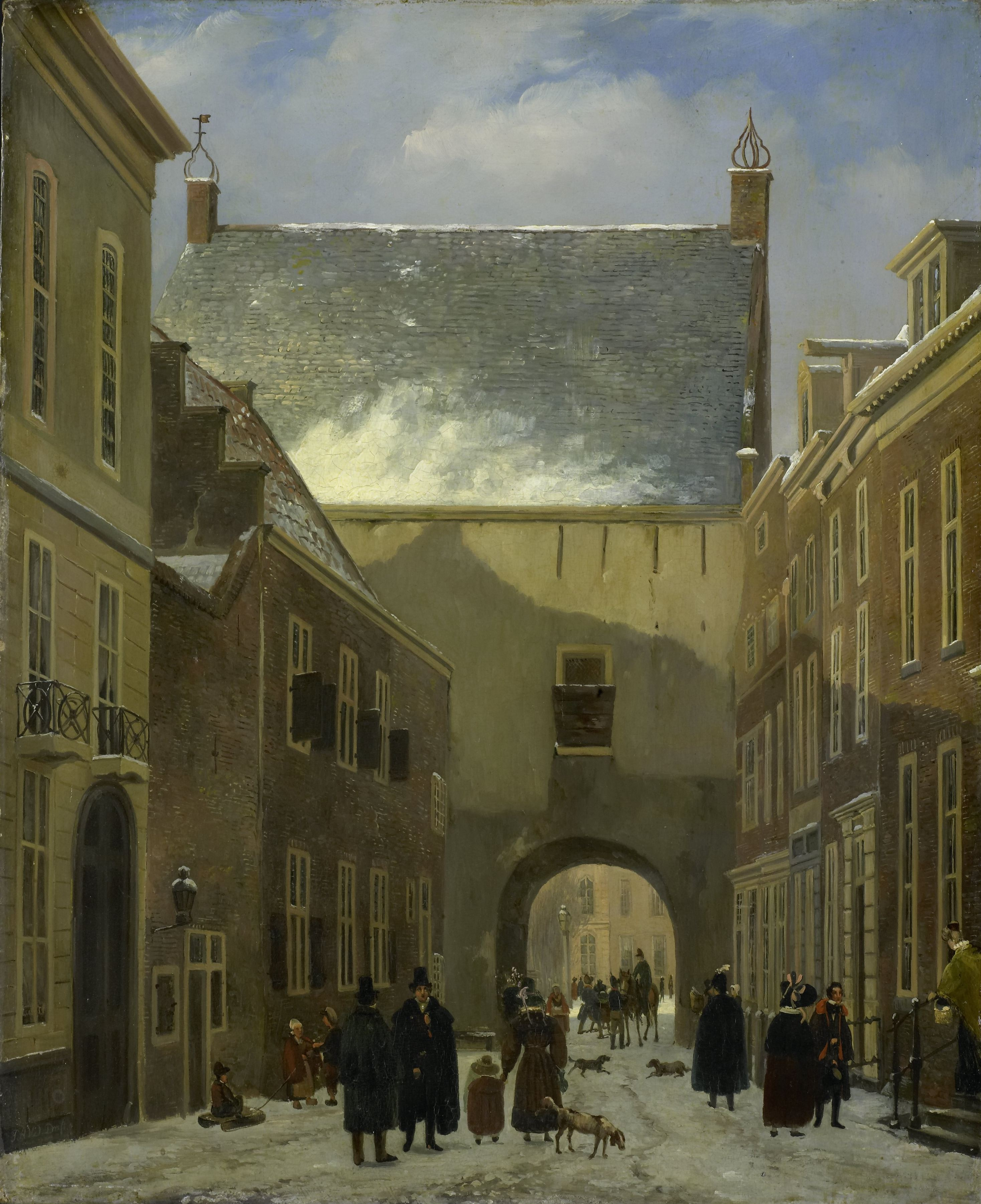
De Gevangenpoort te Den Haag by Johannes Adrianus van der Drift (between 1820-1830)

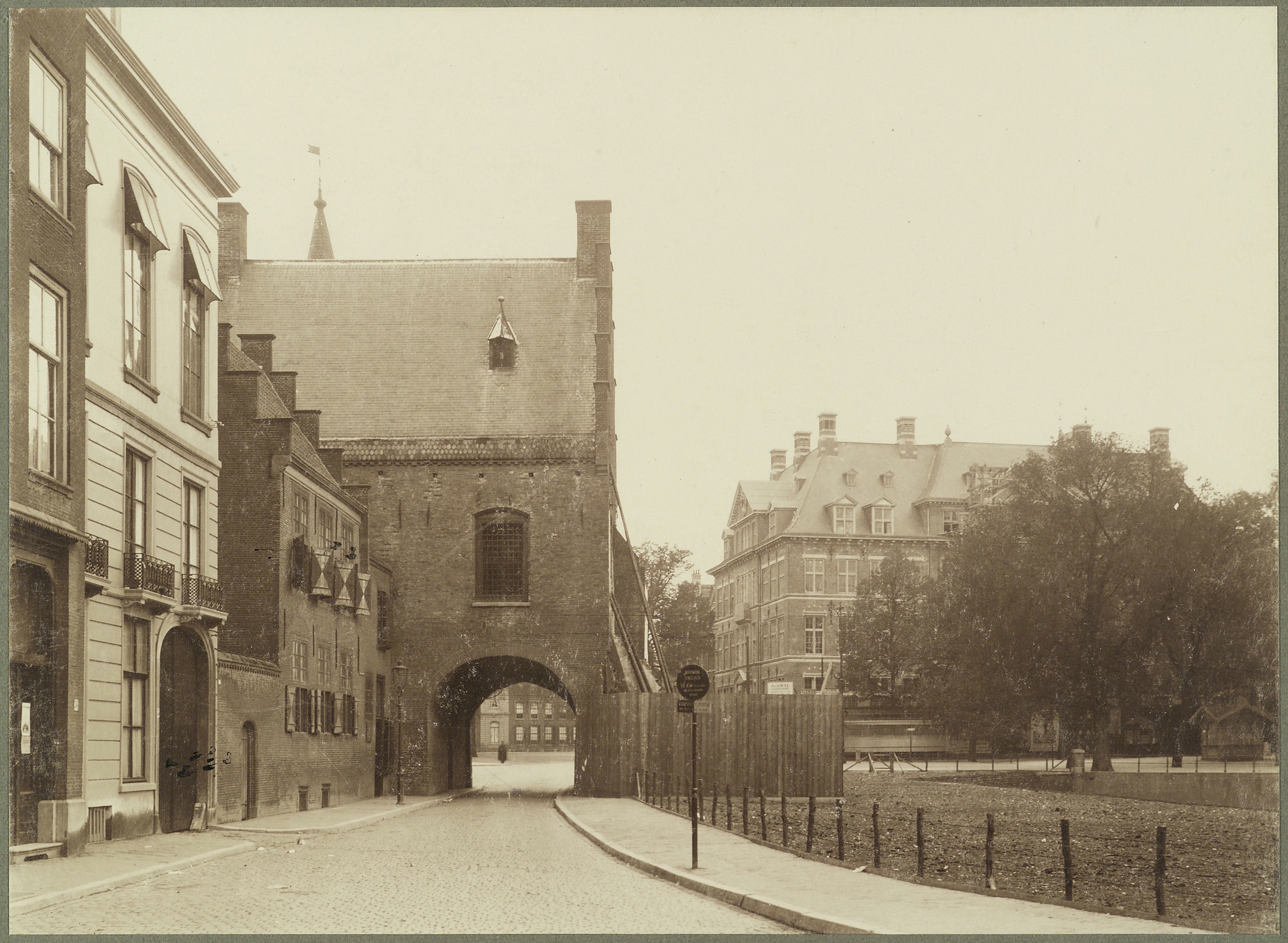
Situation in 1923 shortly after the buildings were torn down to make way for the new road construction
