= Jan de Baen =

Dutch painter

- Self portrait of Jan de Baen with his wife
- Born: 20 February 1633; Haarlem, Dutch Republic
- Died: 1702 (aged 68–69); The Hague, Dutch Republic
- Education: Jacob Adriaensz Backer
- Known for: Painting
- Movement: Dutch Golden Age painting
- Patrons: Charles II of England

Jan de Baen (20 February 1633 – 1702) was a Dutch portrait painter who lived during the Dutch Golden Age. He was a pupil of the painter Jacob Adriaensz Backer in Amsterdam from 1645 to 1648. He worked for Charles II of England in his Dutch exile, and from 1660 until his death he lived and worked in The Hague. His portraits were popular in his day, and he painted the most distinguished people of his time.

== Biography ==
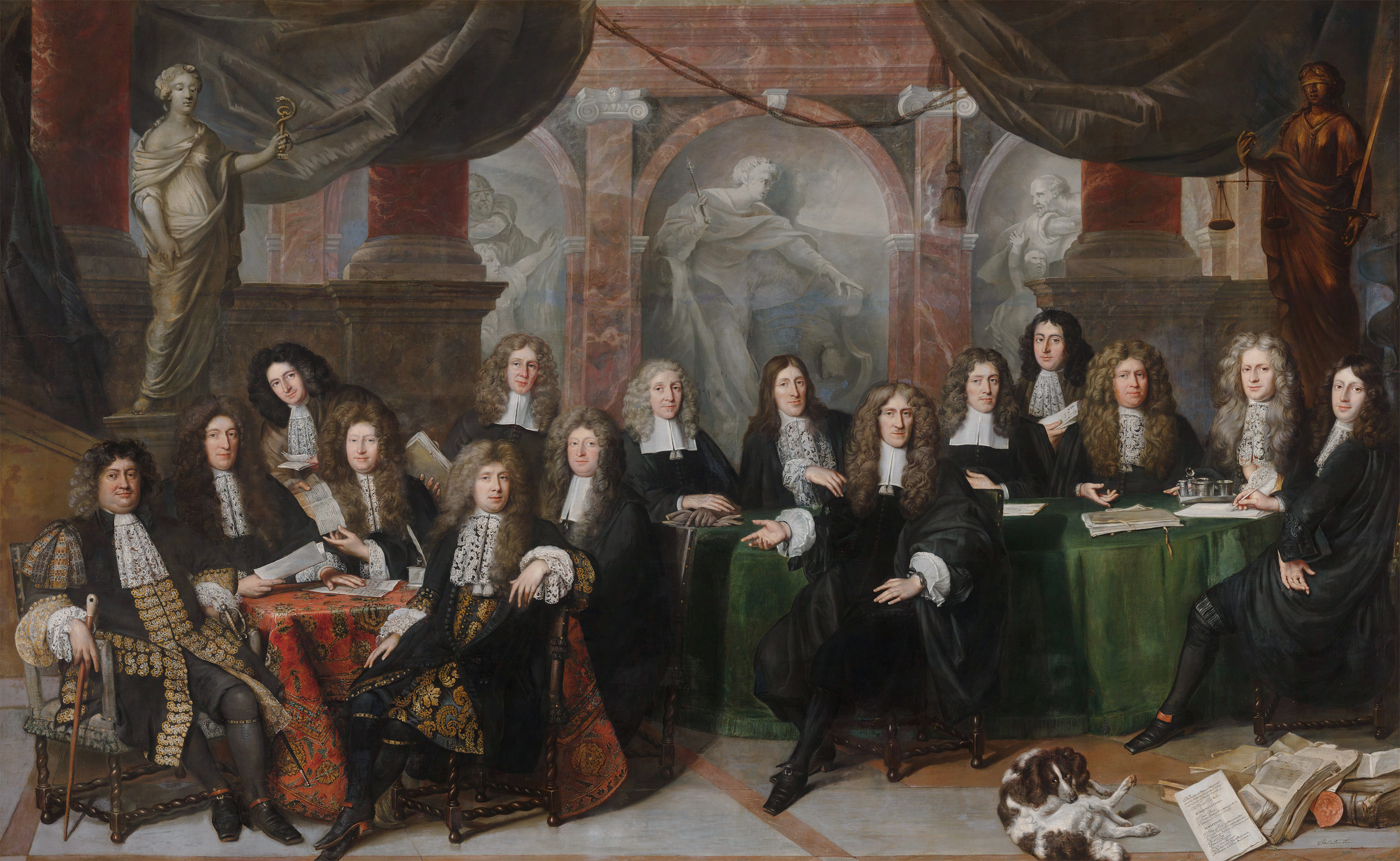
Members of the magistrate of The Hague, 1682

Jan de Baen was born on 20 February 1633 in Haarlem, Holland, Dutch Republic. After his parents died, when he was a child, he lived with his uncle Hinderk Pyman (or Piemans) in Emden. Jan de Baen received his first painting lessons from his uncle, who was a painter himself. From 1645 to 1648 he lived in Amsterdam, where he was the pupil of painter Jacob Adriaensz Backer.

After completing his training, he worked for the exiled court of Charles II of England, but upon the English Restoration of 1660 did not follow his patron, but moved to The Hague, where he worked as a portrait painter for the rest of his life. The Elector of Brandenburg asked him to work at his court in Berlin, but he refused this invitation. He was the teacher of his son, the painter Jacobus de Baen, and the pupils Johann Friedrich Bodecker, Denys Godijn, Hendrik van Limborch, Nicolaes van Ravesteyn, Petro van Rijs, Jan van Sweel, and Johannes Vollevens.

He died in 1702 around his 69th birthday, and was buried in The Hague on 8 March 1702. In his biographical sketch of Jan de Baen, Houbraken claims that he taught his son Jacobus to paint, who died at 27.

== Works ==
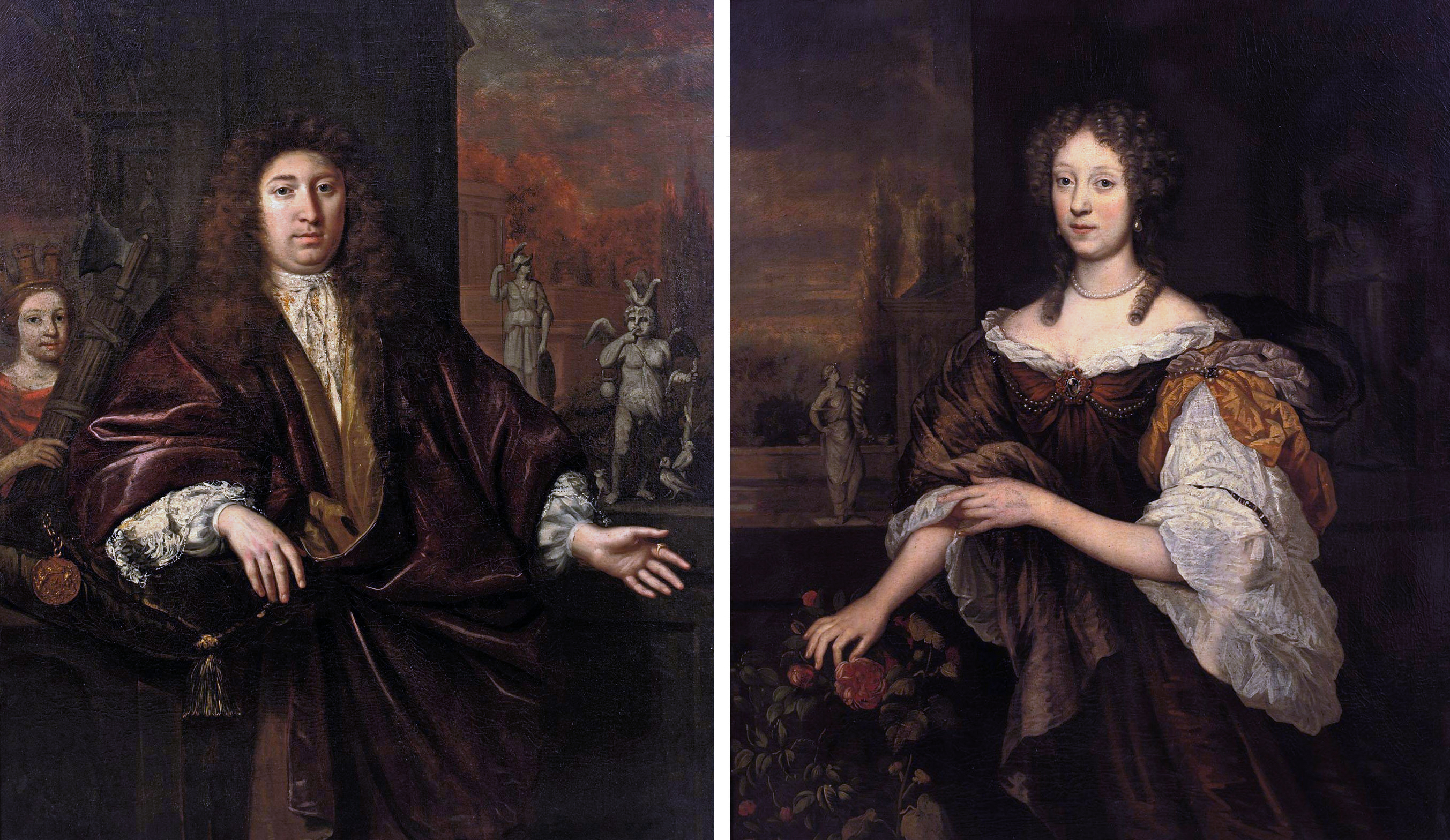
Portrait of Gisbert Cuper and Aleida van Suchtelen

His portraits were popular in his own day, and he painted the most distinguished people of his time. He painted Cornelis de Witt and his brother Johan de Witt both alive and dead. He portrayed the Grandduke of Tuscany, and King-stadtholder William III of England. Besides portraits, he also painted cityscapes, history paintings, and genre paintings.

The German Meyers Konversations-Lexikon (1885–1892) states that his large reputation during his life was not justified by his "characterless, rigid, and unattractively coloured images".

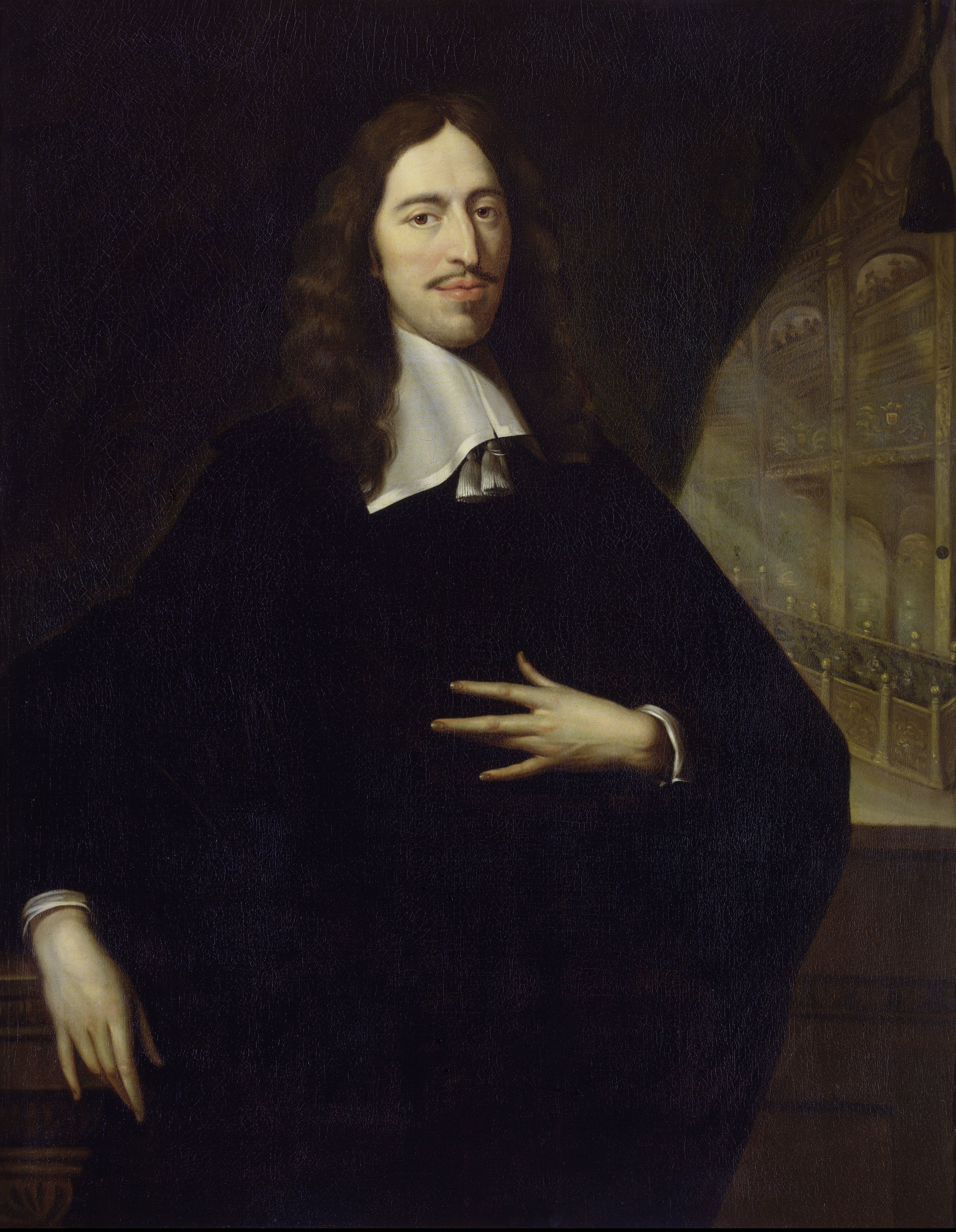
Portrait of Johan de Witt (1625-72), Grand Pensionary of Holland (c.1643–1700), copy after Jan de Baen

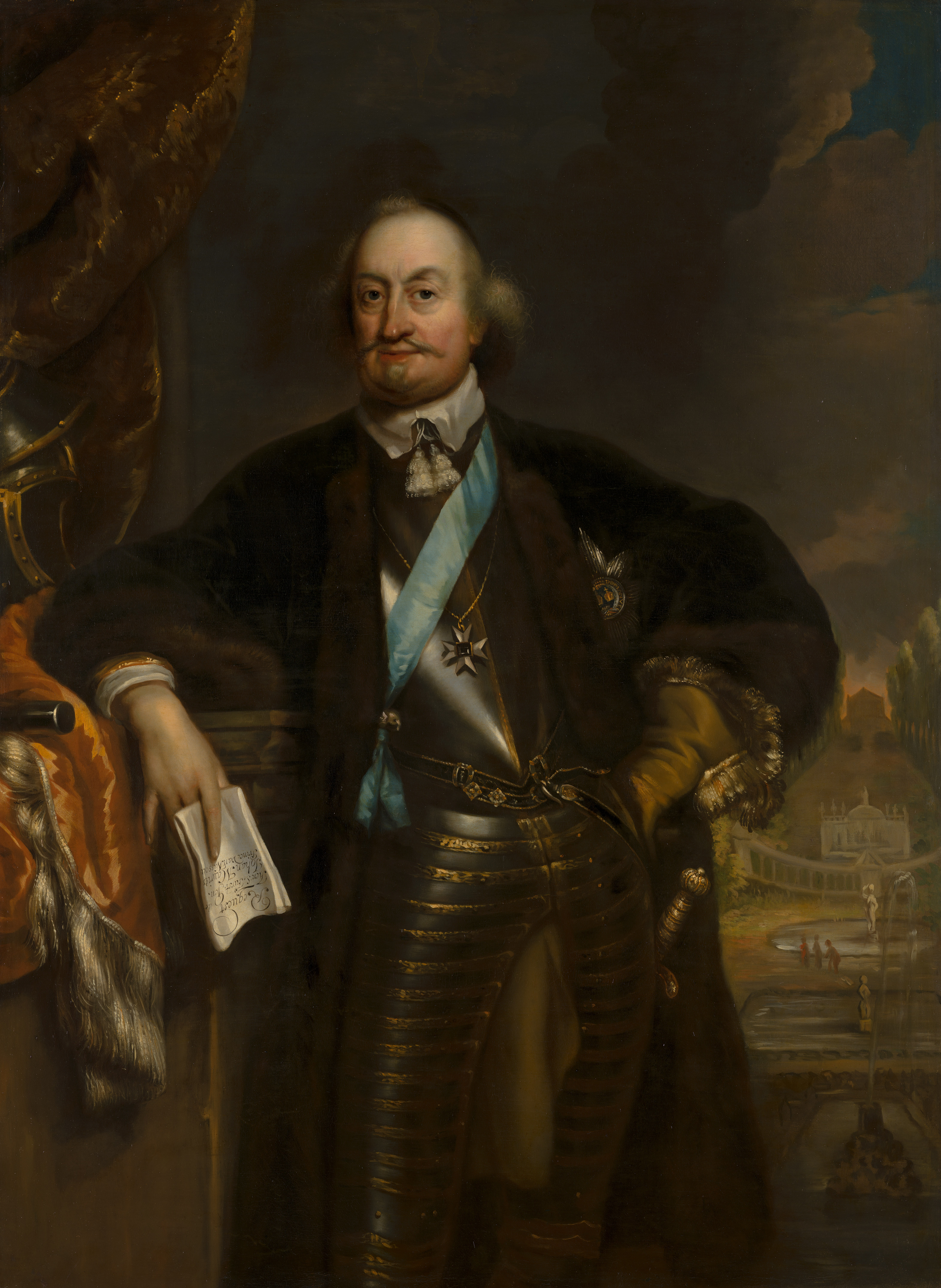
Portrait of Johan Maurits (1604-1679), Count of Nassau-Siegen, Founder of the Mauritshuis (c.1668–1670)

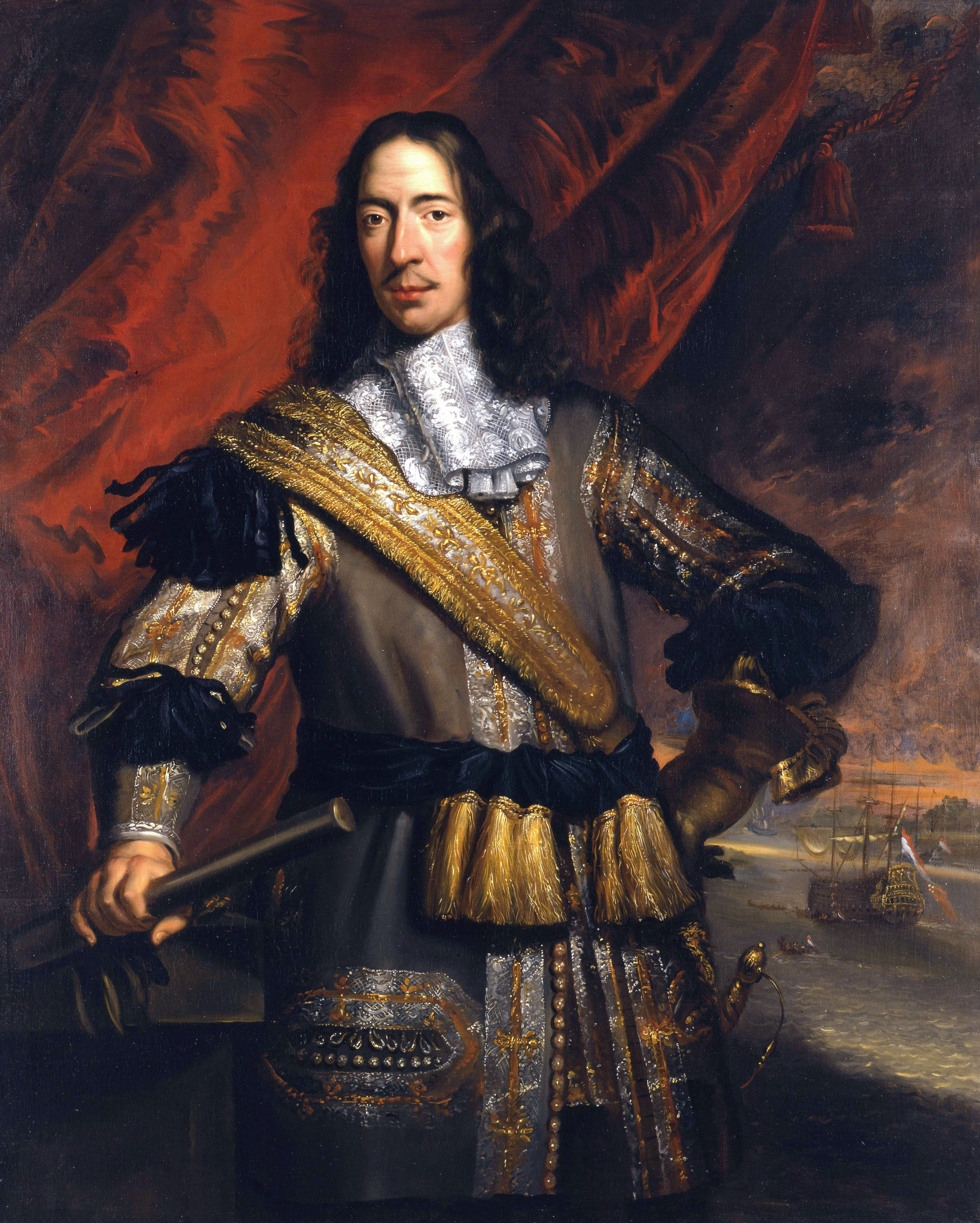
Cornelis de Witt

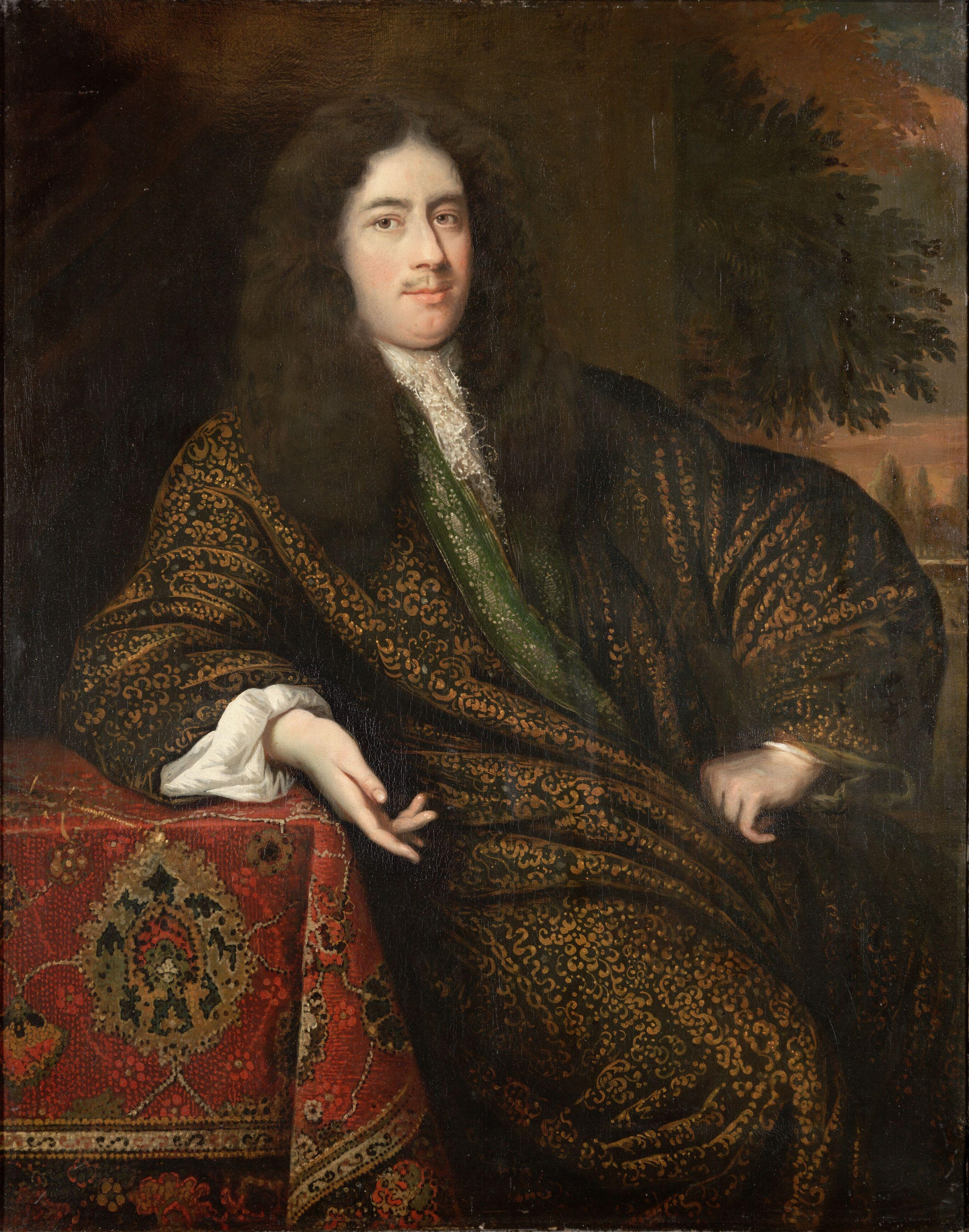
François van Bredehoff

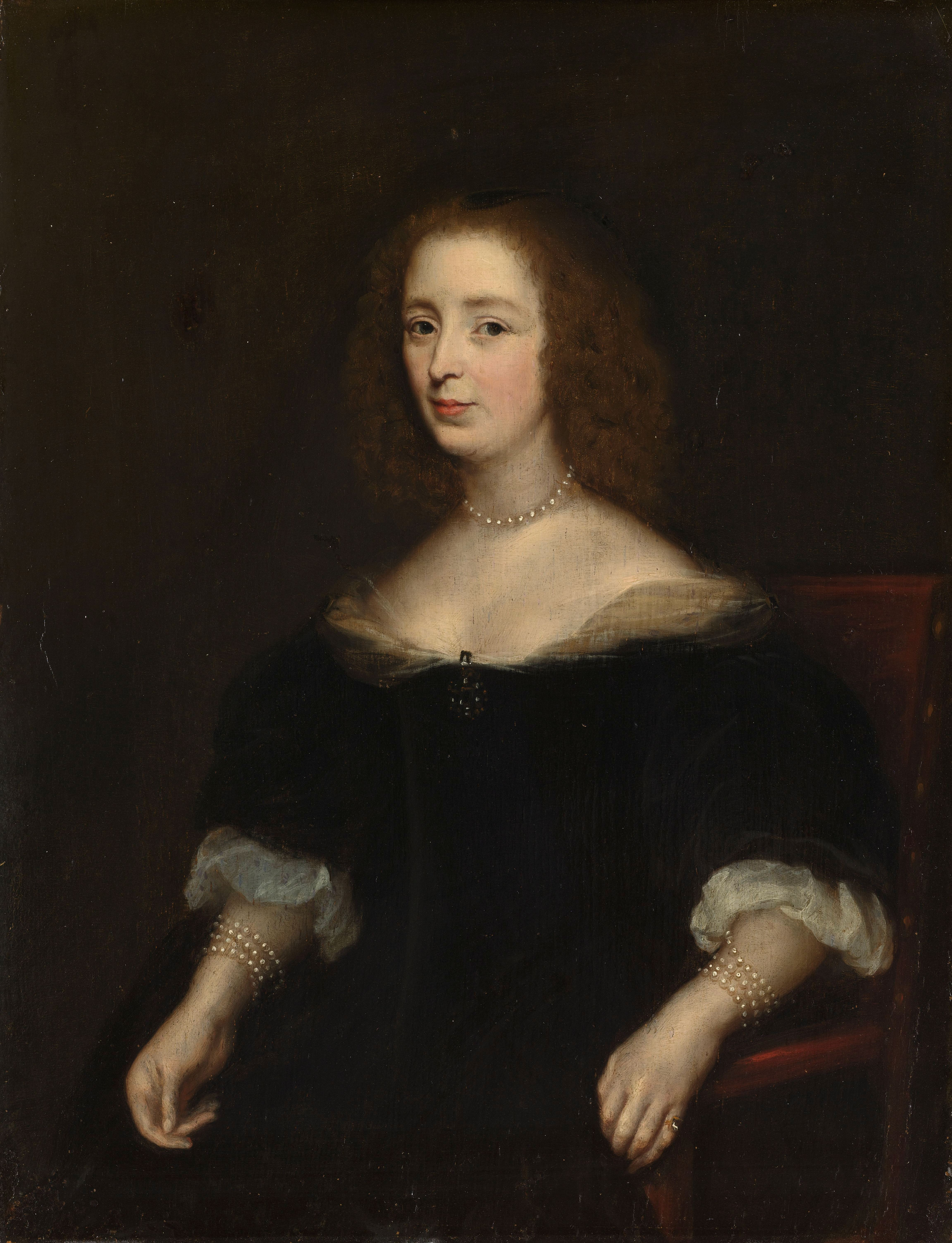
Anna van den Corput (1599-1645)

== See also ==
- Dutch Golden Age painting
