= Paul Baan =

Paul Baan (born 1951), together with his older brother Jan Baan, headed the information technology firm Baan Company, which made a name for itself between 1995 and 2000.

== Baan Company ==
Baan Company was listed at the Amsterdam Stock Exchange in mid 1995. Through mid 1998 the share price increased at an average of 110% per annum, thus multiplying by a staggering nine times. In the following two years, however, the stock crashed.

== Baan Business Systems ==
Paul Baan resigned as an executive director of Baan Company in December 1995 in order to build up Baan Business Systems (BBS), which had been separated from Baan Company a few months before the latter started trading as a public company. BBS remained a private company, owned exclusively by the Baan brothers, while it marketed the software developed within Baan Company. The sale of shares of Baan Company enabled the financing of BBS. The Baan brothers, thus, let their ownership interest in Baan Company, held through Stichting Oikonomos (Oikonomos Foundation), slip to 47% in mid 1996, but kept their interest in marketing-arm BBS at 100%.

The Baan brothers focussed on the development and sale of software, which lent itself to nearly costless duplication onto computer diskettes, leaving advisory and support at client sites, i.e. the actual implementation, to third parties, such as Capgemini. Paul Baan was, therefore, often heard saying in these years: “Software is allemaal winst!” (Software is all profit!)

== Noaber Foundation ==
In 2000, Oikonomos Foundation, which remained in the hands of the elder brother, saw the younger brother's business interests spun off as Noaber Foundation. Noaber Foundation manages exclusively Paul Baan's wealth.
