= Fiona Baan =

Scottish-American equestrian

- Fiona Baan, from a posthumous tribute published online in 2019
- Born: Fiona Valerie Fulton; December 21, 1938; Scotland, U.K.
- Died: June 19, 1994 (aged 55); Chester, New Jersey, U.S.
- Occupation: Equestrian sports administrator

Fiona Valerie Fulton Baan (December 21, 1938 – June 19, 1994) was a Scottish-born American equestrian sports administrator. She was the dressage and driving trainer, manager, and director of the United States Equestrian Team (USET) from 1976 to 1994.

== Early life and education ==
Fiona Fulton was born in Scotland, the daughter of James F. Fulton and Edith Agnes Chandler. She became an accomplished horsewoman in the Cotswolds.

== Career ==
Baan worked in the hotel industry as a young woman, and traveled internationally in that work. In 1966 became secretary with the United States Equestrian Team, based in New Jersey. She competed in local horse shows in the 1960s and 1970s.

Baan managed and directed the dressage and driving programs of the United States Equestrian Team from 1976 into 1994. She prepared the athletes and horses for national and international events, including six Summer Olympic Games. At the 1992 Summer Olympics in Barcelona, the American team she directed won a bronze medal in dressage. She judged and organized competitions and training programs at the national and international levels. She also taught dressage clinics. Although ill, she continued working at the USET until the last weeks before her death in 1994.

== Personal life and legacy ==
Fulton married Laszlo (Leslie Baan) in 1963, in New Jersey; they had a daughter, Natalie. Baan died in 1994, at the age of 55, from cancer, at her home in Chester, New Jersey. One obituary called her "the grand dame of dressage." The Fiona Baan “Pursuit of Excellence” Memorial Trophy is given annually at the FEI North American Junior and Young Rider Championships. In 2008, she was posthumously inducted into the Roemer Foundation/USDF Hall of Fame.
