= Cornelis de Witt =

Dutch States Navy officer and statesman (1623–1672)

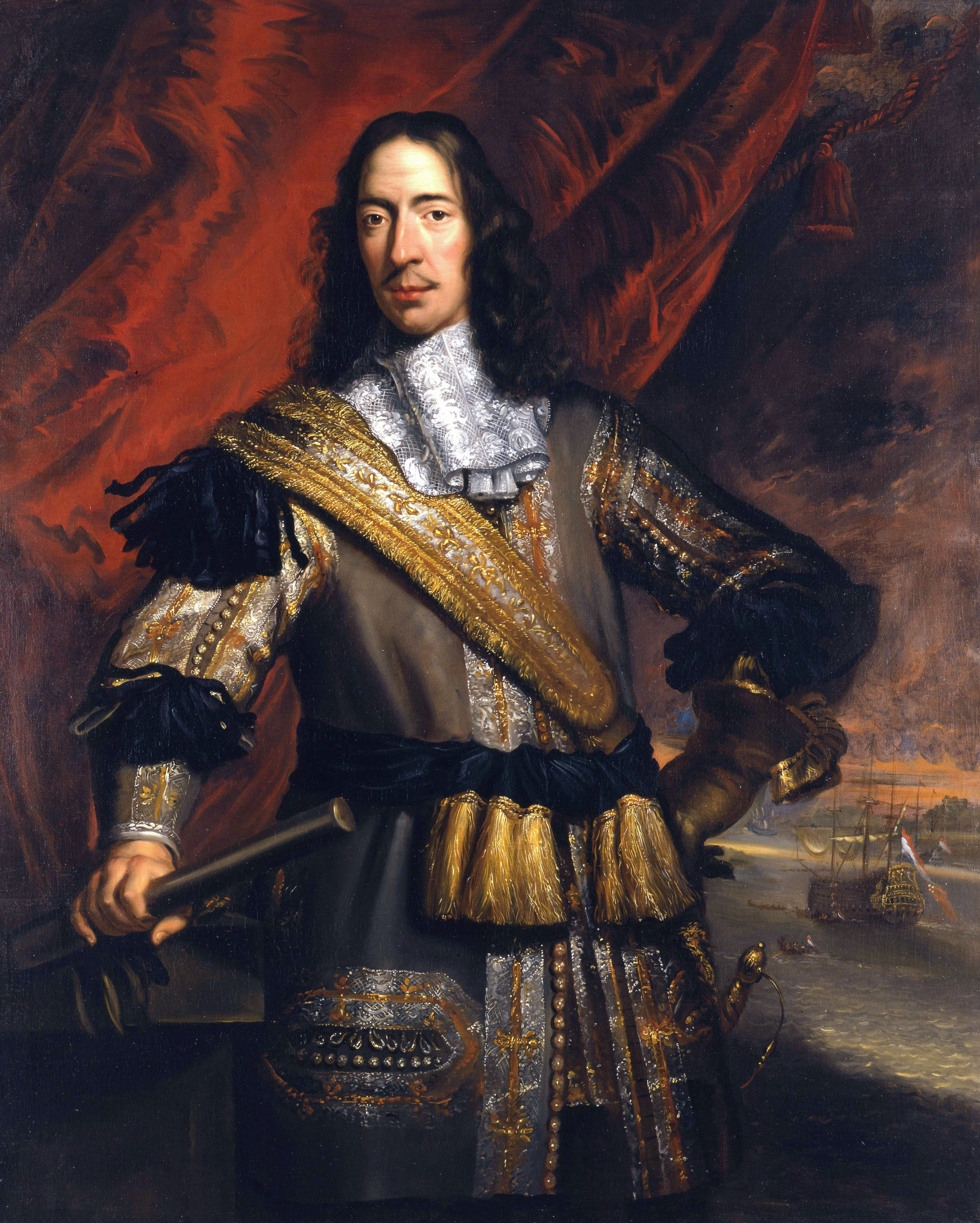
- Portrait by Jan de Baen, c. 1669
- Born: Cornelis de Witt; 15 June 1623; Dordrecht, Dutch Republic
- Died: 20 August 1672 (aged 49); The Hague, Dutch Republic
- Other name: Cornelius de Witt
- Occupations: Regent, mayor, governor, and landlord
- Political party: States Faction
- Spouse: Maria van Berckel
- Children: Wilhelmina
- Father: Jacob de Witt
- Relatives: Johan de Witt (brother); Andries de Witt (uncle)

Cornelis de Witt (15 June 1623 – 20 August 1672) was a Dutch States Navy officer and statesman. During the First Stadtholderless Period, De Witt was an influential member of the Dutch States Party, and was opposed to the House of Orange. In the Rampjaar of 1672, he and his brother Johan de Witt were lynched and their remains eaten by a crowd incited by Orangist partisans.

== Life ==
=== De Witt family ===
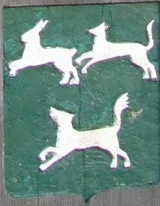
Family coat of arms

Cornelis de Witt was a member of the old Dutch patrician family De Witt. His father was Jacob de Witt, an influential regent and burgher from the patrician class in the city of Dordrecht, which in the 17th century was one of the most important cities of the dominating province of Holland. De Witt's mother was Anna van den Corput (1599–1645), niece of Johannes Corputius, an influential Dutch military leader and cartographer. His younger brother Johan de Witt was Grand Pensionary of Holland from 1653 to 1672. His uncle Andries de Witt previously held the position of Grand Pensionary between 1619 and 1621. Through the marriage of one of his other uncles to Margaretha of Nassau, daughter of Anna Johanna of Nassau-Siegen, De Witt was a distant relative of William of Orange-Nassau. Another relationship led him to the Tromps, Maarten and his son Cornelis Tromp, both admirals of the Netherlands.

=== Political career ===
In 1648 Cornelis de Witt became a schepen (councillor) of Dordrecht. He was afterwards appointed to the important post of ruwaard, who combined the functions of chief of police and prosecuting attorney, of Putten and bailiff of Beierland.

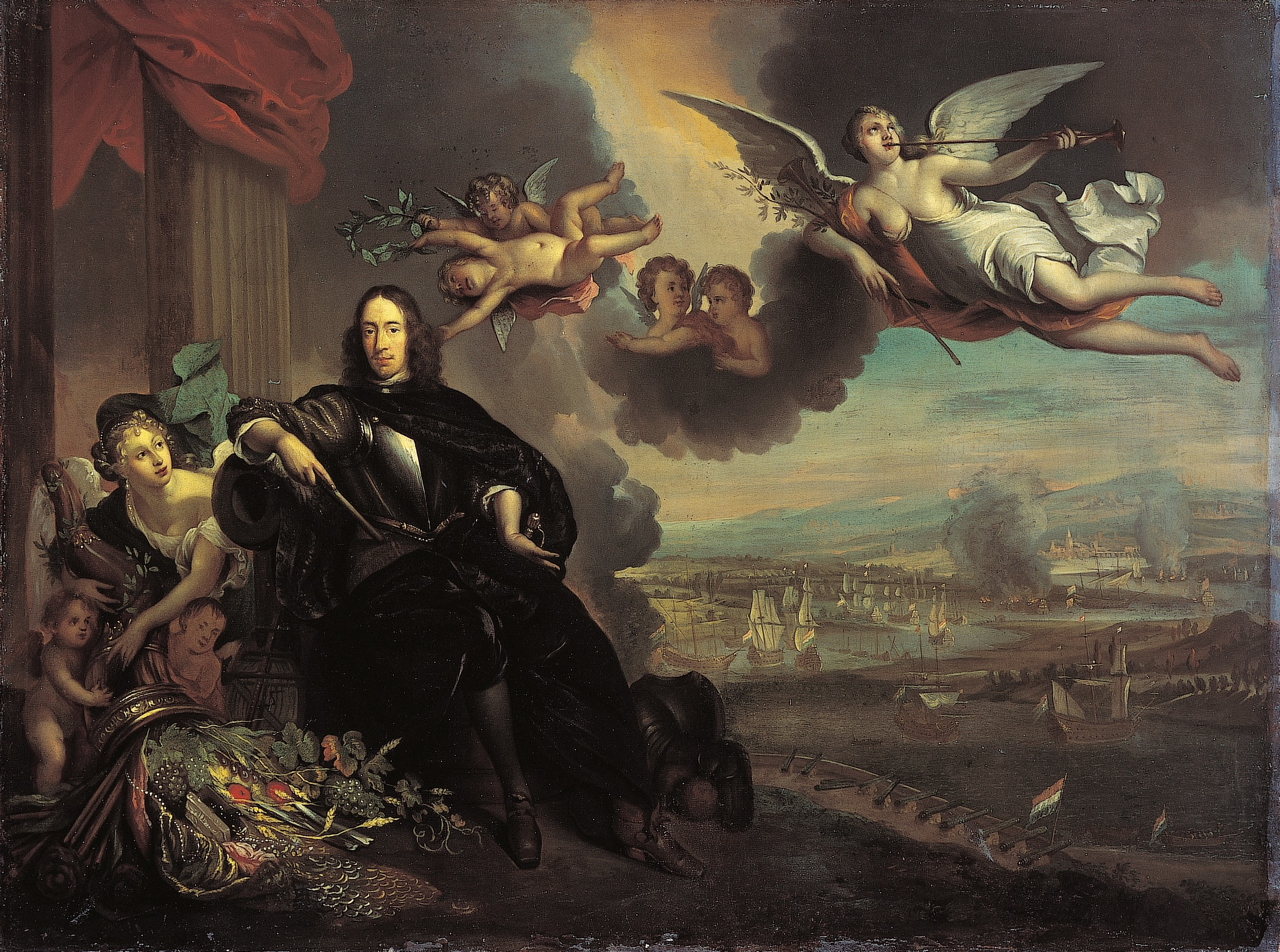
The apotheosis of Cornelis de Witt, with the raid on Chatham in the background. After Jan de Baen

De Witt associated himself closely with his younger brother, the Raadpensionaris of Holland ("Grand Pensionary") Johan de Witt, and supported him throughout his career with great ability and vigour. Johan relied on his older brother for many matters of state. Johan is considered a strategist in their collaboration and Cornelis as a creative person.

Cornelis de Witt was mayor of Dordrecht in 1666 and 1667, and several times deputy of his city in the States of Holland. Between 1663–65 and 1669–71 De Witt was Committed Council of the Zuiderkwartier. In 1667 he was appointed curator of the Leiden University by the States of Holland. In 1665 the States General appointed him deputy in the field in the war with the Bishop of Munster. He acted in the same capacity in 1668, when troops were being gathered for the war between Spain and France.

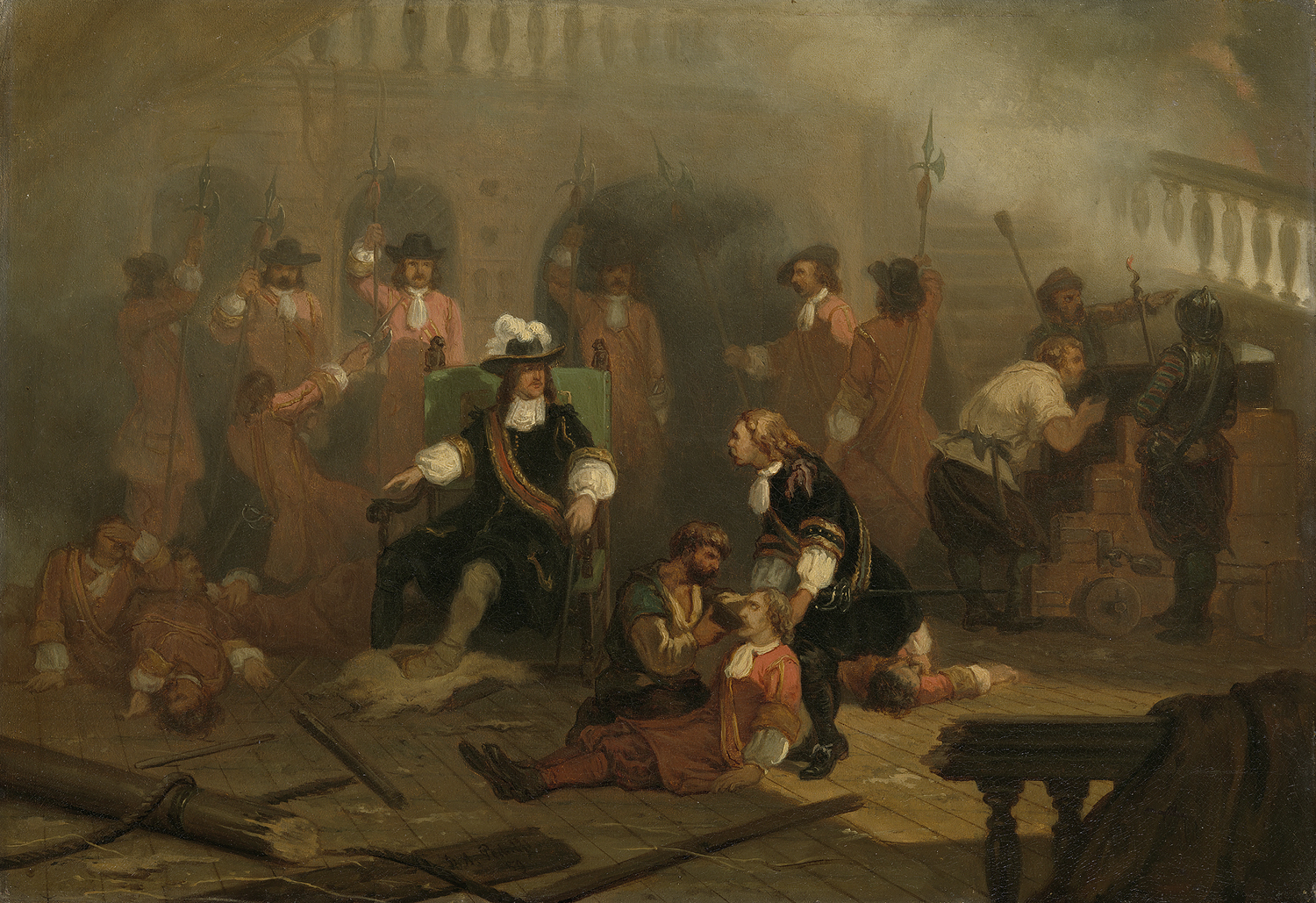
Cornelis de Witt at the Battle of Solebay

In 1667 De Witt was the deputy chosen by the States of Holland to accompany Lieutenant-Admiral Michiel de Ruyter in the raid on the Medway. De Witt distinguished himself during the engagement greatly by his coolness and intrepidity. He again accompanied De Ruyter in 1672 and took part in the battle of Solebay against an Anglo-French fleet. Compelled by illness to leave the Dutch States Navy, he found on his return to Dordrecht that the Orangists were in the ascendant, and he and his brother were the objects of popular suspicion and hatred.

=== Marriage ===
Cornelis de Witt married Maria van Berckel (1632–1706) in 1650. The couple had five children:

- Jacob de Witt (1653–1675). Six days after his father's murder, he set out on a journey to Germany, Geneva, Italy (where he received his doctorate in Padua in 1675) and Austria. He was unmarried and died in Vienna the same year, where he is buried.
- Johan de Witt (1660–1681); was enrolled at the University of Leiden
- Anna de Witt (b. 1667)
- Maria de Witt (b. 1669), married to Arend Muys van Holy, mayor of Dordrecht
- Wilhelmina de Witt (1671–1702). She married her first cousin (the son of Johan de Witt) Johan de Witt Jr. (1662–1701), secretary of Dordrecht

== Death ==
He was arrested on false accusations of treason, but did not confess despite severe torture and was ultimately unlawfully condemned to be banished. He was assassinated by the same carefully organised lynch mob that killed his brother on the day he was to be released, victim of a conspiracy by the Orangists Johan Kievit and Lieutenant-Admiral Cornelis Tromp. Both their bodies were mutilated and their remains were cannibalized. Their hearts were carved out to be exhibited as trophies. A famous painting of the scene, The Corpses of the De Witt Brothers, is usually attributed to Jan de Baen, who had twice painted De Witt's portrait, though some doubt this attribution.

== In popular culture ==
- Cornelis de Witt and his role in Dutch politics was depicted in the 2015 film Michiel de Ruyter.
- Both brothers play important roles in the novel The Black Tulip by Alexandre Dumas.
- In 2007, Austrian artist Matthias Laurenz Gräff, a distant descendant of the De Graeff-Bicker-De Witt family of the Dutch Golden Age used Jan de Baen's painting of Cornelis in his painting "De Gouden eeuw" (The Golden Age) as part of his Diploma series.

== Gallery ==
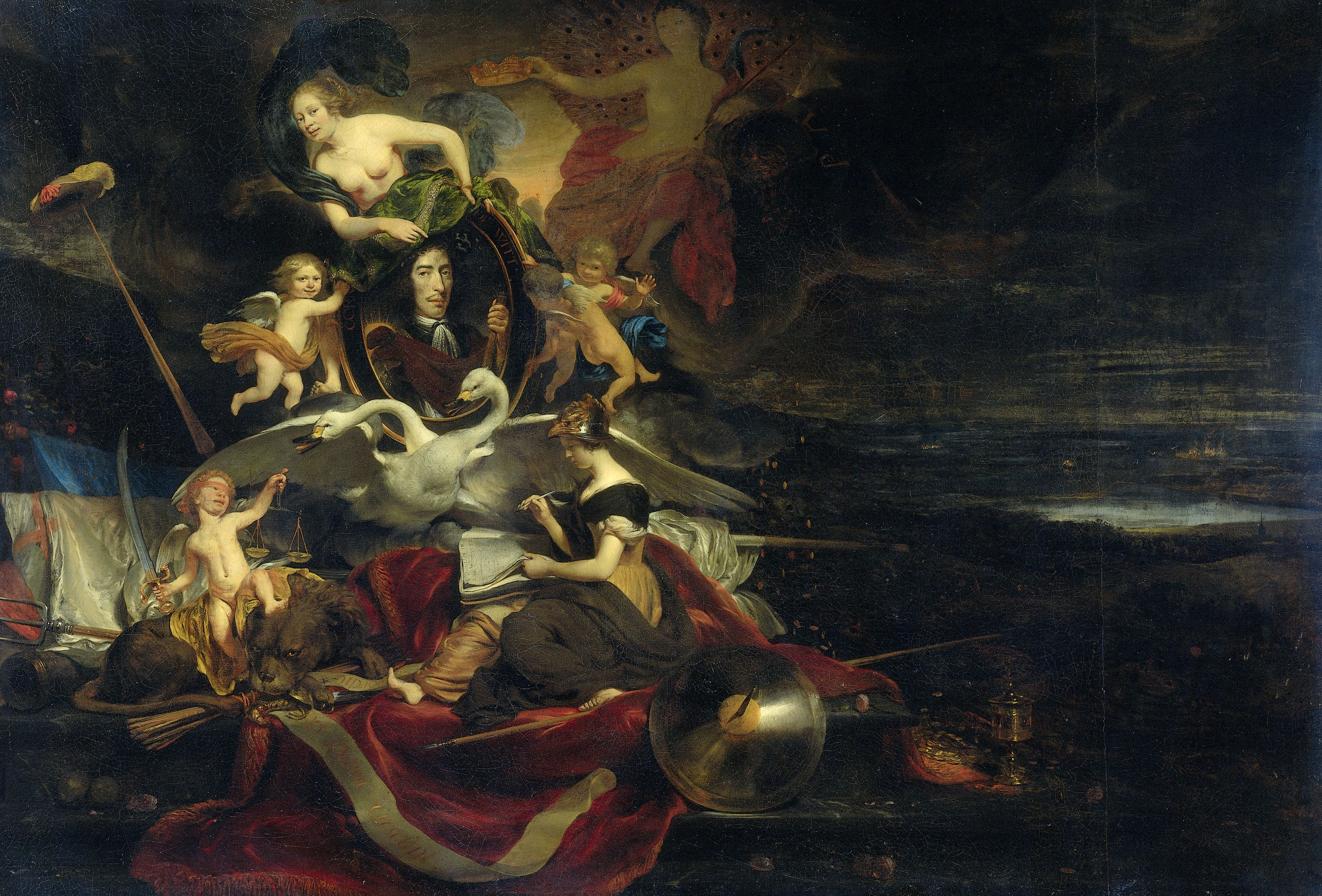
Allegory of the Raid on Chatham (1667) with a portrait of Cornelis de Witt, painted by Cornelis Bisschop (1668)

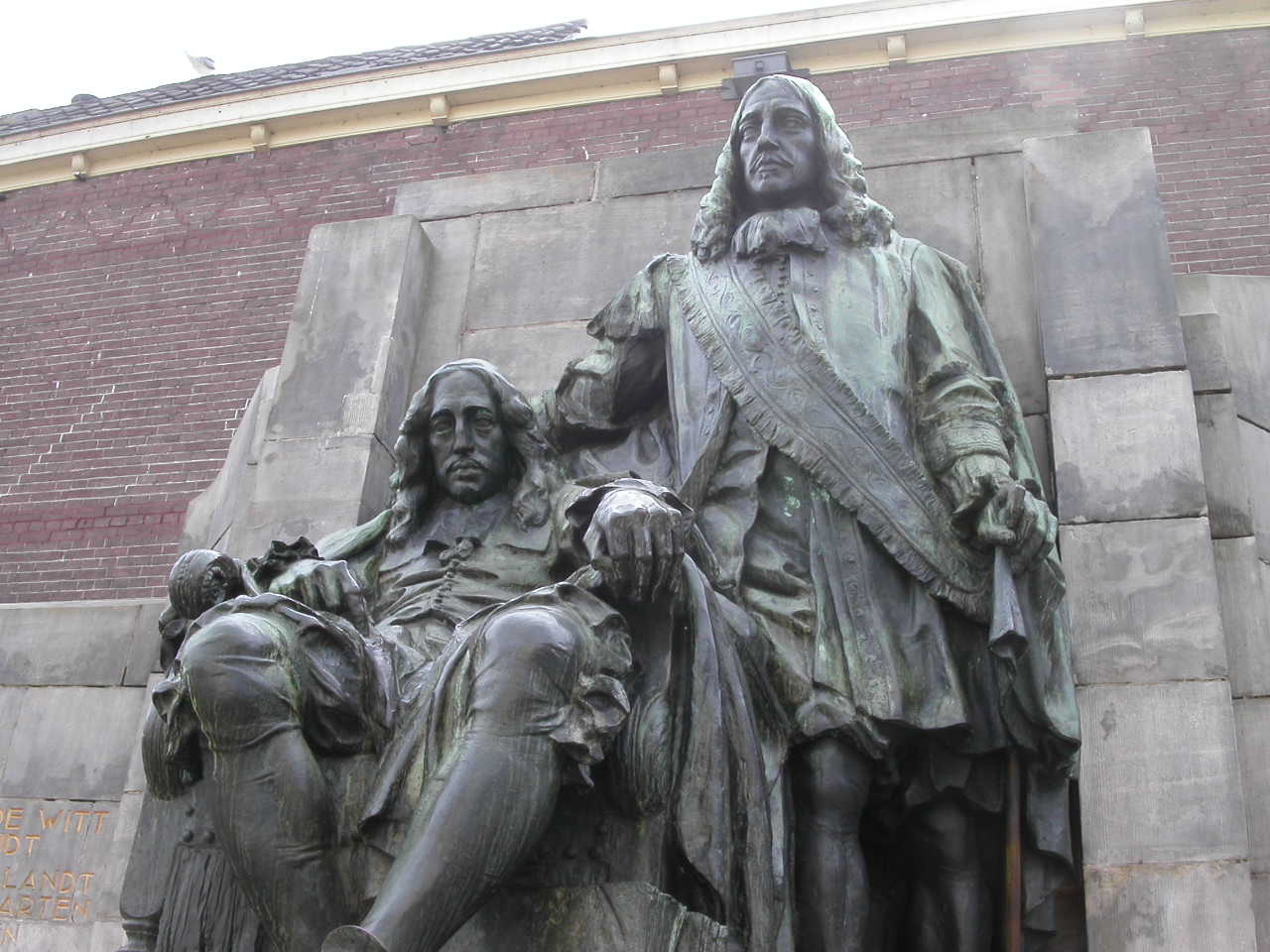
Statue of Johan and Cornelis de Witt at Dordrecht

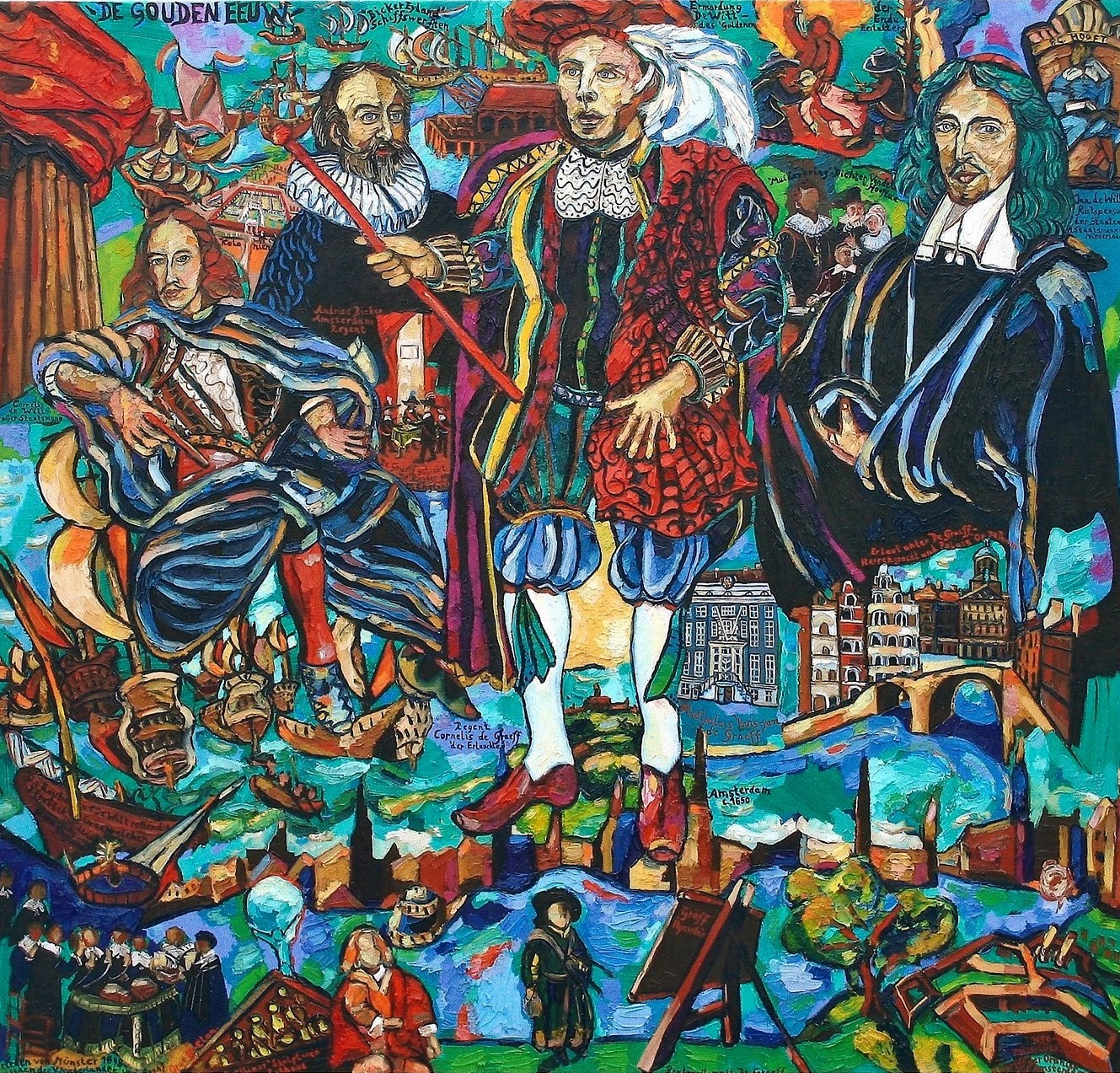
«De Gouden eeuw» with Cornelis de Witt (left), painted by Matthias Laurenz Gräff (2007)

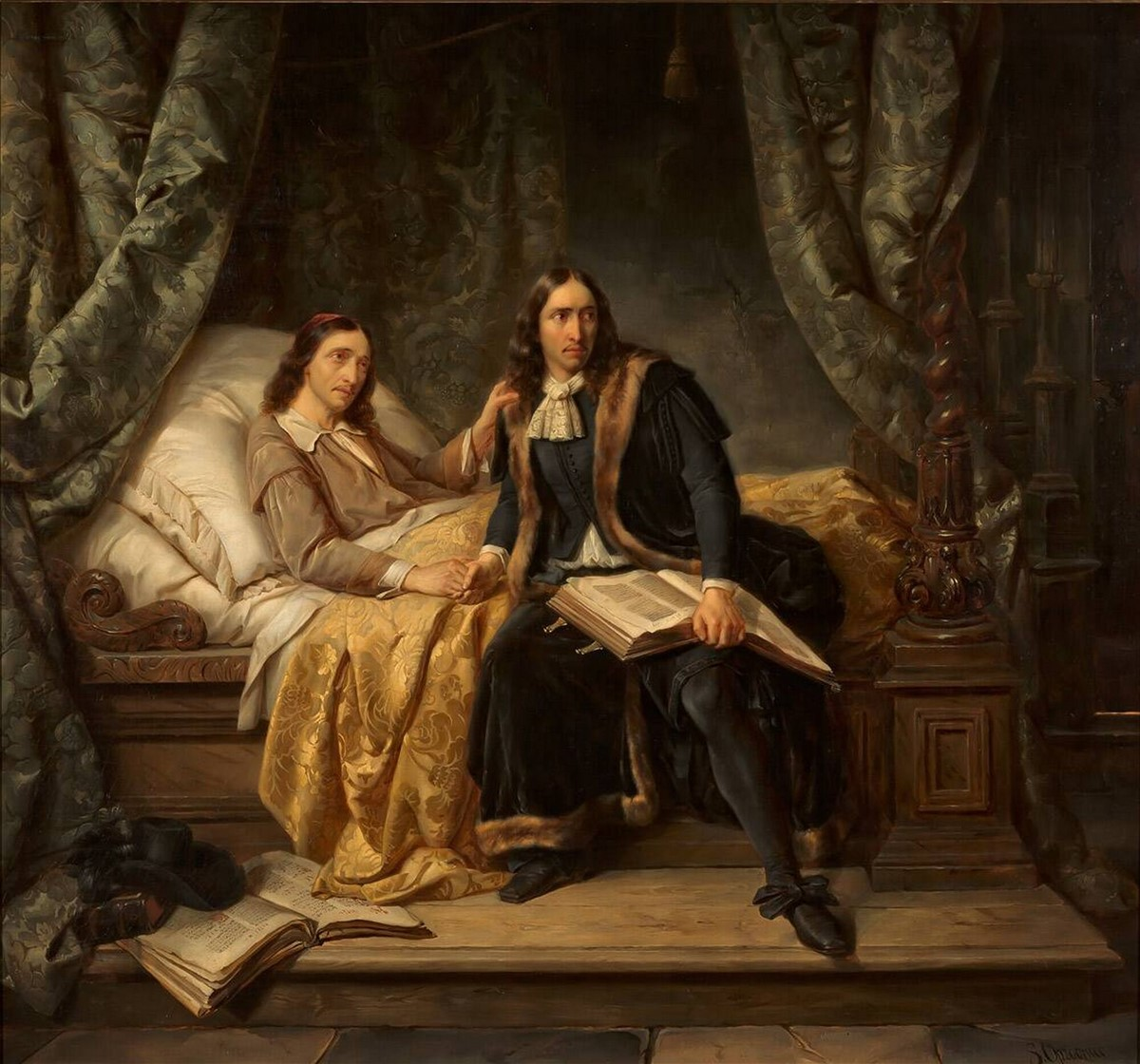
Johan de Witt visited his brother Cornelis in prison), painted by Simon Opzoomer (1843)

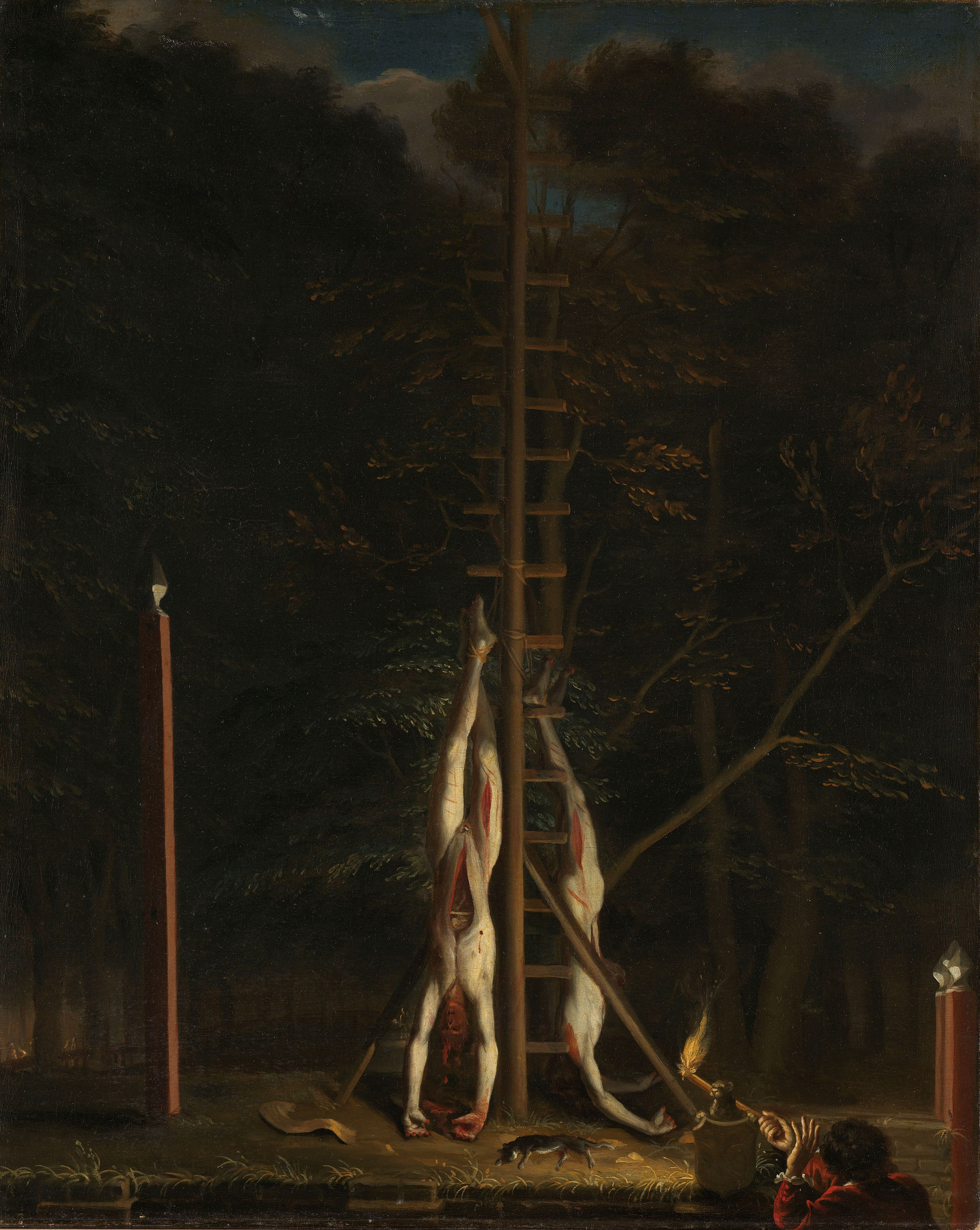
The bodies of the de Witt brothers hanging after their lynching by Jan de Baen (1672/1702), Rijksmuseum, Amsterdam
