= Jacobus de Baen =

Dutch Golden Age portrait painter

Jacobus de Baen (1673, The Hague – 1700, Vienna), was a Dutch Golden Age portrait painter who was the son of Jan de Baen.

== Biography ==
According to Houbraken his father Jan de Baan was so sad when his son died at 27 that he died himself only two years later.

According to the RKD he learned to paint from his father Jan de Baen. From 1684-1692 he was a student at the academy of the Confrerie Pictura. In 1692 he travelled to Italy via London and France. In Rome he became a member of the Bentvueghels with the nickname Gladiator. In 1693 he travelled with the party of William III to London. He died in Vienna in 1700.

According to Jan van Gool who wrote his biography in his "Nieuwe Schouburg" in 1750, he spent more than he earned when he was with the Bentvueghels, and increased his productivity when he left Rome. He could have been a greater painter than his father if he had lived longer.
