= Jan Baan =

Dutch entrepreneur and venture capitalist

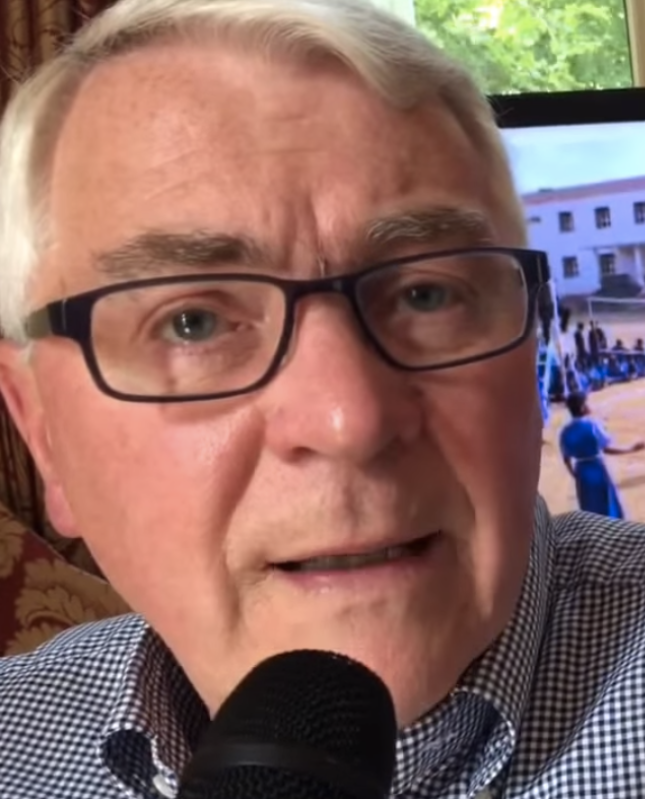
Jan Baan

Jan Baan (Born in Rijssen, 9 March 1946) is a Dutch entrepreneur and venture capitalist, known as the founder of the Baan Company, a software company providing Enterprise Resource Planning (ERP) software. After selling the company, he founded Cordys, a company to provide web-related ERP products.

== Biography ==
Baan was born and raised in Rijssen as eldest son in a family of ten. His father was a carpenter, and his grandfather on his mother's side was cofounder of a regional bus company.

At the age of 16, Baan started working at a meatworks, leaving secondary school without a degree. After serving in the military, Baan got a job at an accounting firm. In 1970, he started working for a wholesale firm, where after two years he became head of the accounting department. When the company bought their first computer, Baan got acquainted with automation. Mid 1970s Baan started working as a consultant, and shortly managed the financial department of a large company.

In 1978, Jan founded The Baan Company, a software company providing ERP solutions, which became a major player in the ERP software industry. Jan Baan left the Baan Company in 1998. After his efforts with the Baan Company, Baan became a venture capitalist and invested in companies like Top Tier and WebEx; both were eventually valued above $1billion. Top Tier was later sold to SAP, while WebEx was sold to Cisco. In an interview, Baan said that "... with WebEx and Top Tier I was an investor. Baan, and Cordys, I do for life. I am not a serial entrepreneur at all."

In 2005, Baan wrote a book on his life as an entrepreneur, called The Way to Market Leadership.

== Work ==
=== Baan Company ===
The Baan Company was founded in 1978. With the development of his first software package in 1979, he commenced his career in the ERP industry. His brother Paul Baan joined him in the management of the company. Under Jan's stewardship, the company made good market in the field of Enterprise Resource Planning (ERP) software and grew from a $35 million company in the early 1990s, to $680 million in 1998.

The Baan Company competed successfully with large companies like SAP and PeopleSoft and became the number 2 ERP player in the software industry. However, the company's fall started in 1998 as the stocks started to dip and eventually in 2000, it was sold to the British company Invensys.

=== Cordys ===
In 2001, Baan started a new company, Cordys, along with Theodoor van Donge. The intention was to produce products serving to bridge the traditional Enterprise Resource Planning products with the internet, using the internet as the front end. In 2010, Cordys Switzerland AG was founded as an independent legal entity according to Swiss law. The Swiss company was not part of the later M&A deal between Jan Baan and OpenText.

In August 2013, Jan Baan sold Cordys to OpenText for 33M USD.

=== Vanenburg Software and Rappit ===
In 2009, Jan Baan founded Vanenburg Software, part of the Vanenburg Group. The company develops enterprise software and focuses on application modernization using open Java technologies and the Google Cloud Platform.

In November 2022, Vanenburg introduced Rappit Developer, a tool designed to support rapid prototyping of web and mobile applications. The platform also enables the integration of data from legacy enterprise resource planning (ERP) systems, such as Baan (Infor LN), for analytics and modernization purposes.

In 2024, Vanenburg Software was renamed Rappit, marking a transition toward a product-oriented structure and international expansion. The company is headquartered at Vanenburg Castle in Putten, the Netherlands, and operates in India, employing over 250 people.

As of 2024, Rappit is managed by Baan’s sons — Ardjan, Paul, and Bernhard — with Jan Baan serving as founder and chairman in an advisory role.

== Reformed religion ==
As a Christian and businessman, the entrepreneur from Lunteren handled his principles creatively. He managed to combine the prohibition on labor on Sunday with virtually unimpeded services to customers by working in different time zones. Even when Baan had hundreds of employees in the Netherlands, the reformed character of the company was unmistakable. The downturn of the company in 1999 was a reason for the establishment of the De Keursteen Stichting that fights financial abuses in reformational circuit.
