= Baan Corporation =

Dutch software vendor

The Baan Corporation
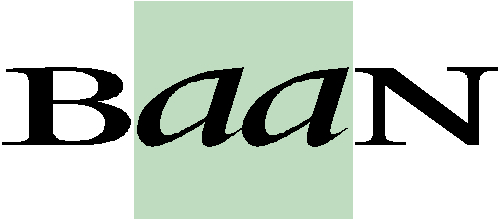
- Type: Private
- Industry: Software
- Founded: Barneveld, Netherlands, (1978)
- Defunct: July 2003
- Fate: acquired by SSA Global Technologies, now part of Infor Global Solutions
- Headquarters: Barneveld, Netherlands
- Key people: Jan Baan, Paul Baan, Laurens van der Tang
- Products: ERP

Baan was a vendor of enterprise resource planning (ERP) software that is now owned by Infor Global Solutions. Baan or Baan ERP, was also the name of the ERP product created by this company.

== History ==
The Baan Corporation was created by Jan Baan in 1978 in Barneveld, Netherlands to provide financial and administrative consulting services. With the development of his first software package, Jan Baan and his brother Paul Baan entered what was to become the ERP industry. The Baan company focused on the creation of enterprise resource planning (ERP) software.

Jan Baan developed his first computer program on a Durango F-85 computer in the programming language BASIC. In the early '80s, The Baan Corporation began to develop applications for Unix computers with C and a self-developed Baan-C language, the syntax of which was very similar to the BASIC language.

Baan rose in popularity during the early '90s. Baan software is famous for its Dynamic Enterprise Modeler (DEM), technical architecture, and its 4GL language. Baan 4GL and Tools is still considered to be one of the most productive database application development platforms.

In 1992 Baan entered into a licencing agreement with ASK Computer Systems to incorporate Triton 2.2d into its MANMAN/X product.

Baan became a real threat to market leader SAP after winning a large Boeing deal in 1994. It went IPO in 1995 and became a public listed company in Amsterdam and US Nasdaq. Several large consulting firms around the world partnered to implement Baan IV for multi-national companies. It acquired several other software companies to enrich its product portfolio, including Antalys, Aurum, Berclain, Coda and Caps Logistics. Sales growth rate was once claimed to reach 91% per year.

However the fall of the Baan Company began in 1998. The management exaggerated company revenue by booking "sales" of software licenses that were actually transferred to a related distributor. The discovery of this revenue manipulation led to a sharp decline of Baan's stock price at the end of 1998.

In June 2000, facing worsening financial difficulties, lawsuits and reporting seven consecutive quarterly losses and bleak prospects, Baan was sold at a price of US$700 million to Invensys, a UK automation, controls, and process solutions group to become a unit of its Software and Services Division. Laurens van der Tang was the president of this unit. With the acquisition of Baan, Invensys's CEO Allen Yurko began to offer "Sensor to Boardroom" solutions to customers.

In June 2003, after Allen Yurko stepped down, Invensys sold its Baan unit to SSA Global Technologies for US$ 135 million. Upon acquiring the Baan software, SSA renamed Baan as SSA ERP Ln. In August 2005, SSA Global released a new version of Baan, named SSA ERP LN 6.1.

In May 2006, SSA was acquired by Infor Global Solutions of Atlanta, a major ERP consolidator in the market.
