= Huda al-Baan =

Yemeni politician

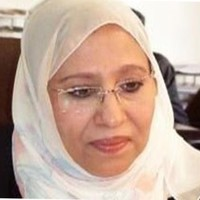

Minister of Human Rights
- In office April 2007 – 20 March 2011
- President: Ali Abdullah Saleh
- Preceded by: Khadija al-Haisami

Personal details
- Born: approx. 1960 (Yemen)
- Education: BA (Economics) Aden University, MA, PhD (Economics) University of Ukraine

Huda al-Baan (Arabic: هدى البان), also spelled al-Ban, is a Yemeni politician. She was Yemen's Minister of Human Rights until 20 March 2011, when she resigned in protest to the government's sniper attacks on protesters during the 2011 Yemen protests.

== Education ==
- 1982, BA in economics (Aden University) with Honors.
- 1987, MA in economical sciences (the National Economics Institute, Ukraine, Kiev) with Honors.
- 1992, PhD in economical sciences (the National Economics Institute, Ukraine, Kiev) with Honors.

== Practical experience ==
1- 2001–present, as a professor in Administration and Economics faculty, Aden University
2- 2007–2011, The minister of human rights, the Republic of Yemen
3- 2002–2007, The assistant general secretary – for Yemeni national committee for Education, culture, & science
4- 2000–2001, general director of society development, Aden University
5- 1986–2000, assistant professor in the Administration and Economics faculty, Aden University
6- 1982–1985, lecturer in the Administration and Economics faculty, Aden University
7- Economical consultations in the feasibility study
8- Economical consultations in the comprehensive rural development
9- Supervisor on Graduation Researches of Economics Faculty students, Aden University and its branches
10- A Member of consultative committee for the consumer magazine
11- A Founder member of the woman Center in Aden University
12- A Founder member of the Environment protagonists in Aden University.
13- A founder member of protagonists of Arab University in Yemen
14- A founder member of Yemeni association of Consumer Protection
15- General secretary for consumer protection
16- Designated member from Aden University presidency to classify the Administration and Economics faculty to two colleges: Economics and Administrative sciences
17- Consultant for Ministry of Education, the vice minister office
18- Member of the council for woman
19- Member of the Economics experts committee
20- Member of the Global net for the development of education
21- Member of the Central council for Yemen woman union

== Studies, research and participation in the scientific field, conferences, and symposiums ==
1- 20 April 1998 The Economical reform between the planning and market economy – Yemen case, research was presented to the Second economical conference "Sana'a".
2- 10 – 12 April 1999 The Yemeni Immigrants and their role in the Development “Study was presented in symposium” the Immigrants are basic support for sustainable Development" organized by Consultative council and Ministry of Immigrants Affairs "Sana'a".
3- 23 – 24 May 1999: Evaluate the investment climate in Yemen and Globalization requests "Research was presented to the fifth conference, Administrative Sciences, and Economics College, Yarmok University "Jordan".
4- 8 – 10 August 1999 Impacts of foreign Indebtedness on the Republic of Yemen’s economy – analytic study – Research was presented to aids and loans symposium and its effects on the development which was organized by Consultative council.
5- 27 – 30 March 2000 International Monetary Fund program for the reform and structural adapting between its concepts and reality results, study on patterns in each: Jordan, Egypt and Yemen "Research was presented to the Arab Economies conference in Kingdom of morocco Al-Jadeeda City.
6- 1996 General frame for investment obstacles in Yemen "Paper was presented in the 110 anniversary for chamber establishment, Aden – organize by Aden University with administration and Economy faculty.
7- 1996 Women and take the political decision “Unpublished Study on woman and political participation in the Republic of Yemen prepared for symposium it was to organize by the Arab center for strategic studies in Damascus.
8- February 1999 The role of Arab council and the future challenges “Interweaving in occasion of fifty anniversary for Arab University establishment".
9- 17 October 1999: The role of women in the Development " Scientific Seminar on Yemeni woman Rights and her role in the Yemeni Society" Aden.
10- 5 – 7 November 2000 Additional opinions for Strategic view 2025 in the social field " paper was presented in Symposium of Strategic view for Republic of Yemen 2025 which organized by Consultive council "Sana'a".
11- 27 – 28 April 2002 Arab women and Development “production and consumption" (Study was presented for the Arab woman and economy forum "Kuwait".
12- 5–8 may 2002: Mechanism of developing the vocational and technical education in the Republic of Yemen (study was presented to the regional workshop on promoting the girls and women participation in the social and economical Development "Dubai _ United Arab Emirates.
13- July 2002: In the concepts of economical development and it's obstacles (Work Paper was presented in the training course for girls students who are studying in the University and without job, under auspices of Islamic Organization for Educational, scientific and cultural.
14- 21–23 December 2002 Deteriorating the Environment and poverty in the developing nations "Work paper was presented to the regional workshop on environment education and comprehensive Development under auspices of Islamic Organization for Educational, scientific and cultural "Sana'a".
15- 19 – 22 July 2004 Decreasing the poverty rate and ways of development fund. (Work Paper was presented for the regional symposium for combating poverty, under auspices Esesco, Amman, Jordan.
16- 2006 The economical globalization and its effect on marketing, production, and funding. "Unpublished research".
17- High education to where …? "Study was presented in series of economical magazine of Saba'a Agency.
18- Different articles in various specialized magazines special in different issues from economical magazine of Saba'a Agency.
19- The Social and economic disadvantages of chewing Qat for Yemeni women "Work paper was presented for symposium of disadvantages of chewing Qat on Yemeni woman" Aden University".
20- 2001 Work paper was presented in symposium of population policy and the National responsibility "Sana'a".
21- Cultural diversity and Civilizations dialogue globalization "work paper was presented to the experts meeting on Universal declaration for cultural diversity.
22- 11 – 12 February 2001 Participated in the council of constitutional modifications and local power law "Sana'a"
23- A representative of the Yemen government for the evaluation of joining the Gulf council economy.
24- 1996 Participated in the symposium of Iraqi woman under the blockade "Baghdad".
25- 1998 Evaluator in the economical reforms conference and the structural adapting (organized by Dar Al-Hekhma)Baghdad.
26- 1997 Participated in the fifth economical conference for economy and administration college, Baghdad University, Iraq.
27- 23 – 24 may 1999 Participated in the fifth economical conference for economy and administration college, Yarmok University, Jordan.
28- 27 – 30 March 2000 Participated in the Arab economists’ conference in the Kingdom of morocco, Aljadeeda City.
29- Participated in the various workshops, symposiums and conferences.
30- 2002 Head of Yemeni delegation in the economy and woman forum, Kuwait.
31- 2002 Participated in the regional workshop of promoting the girls and woman participation in the economical and social development ( organized by UNICO) Dubai, United Arab Emirates.
32- 12 – 15 December 2002 A Member of Yemeni delegation in the twenty third course for executive council for Islamic Organization of Education, Science, and Culture, Alrabat, Kingdom of morocco.
33- December 2003 Member of Yemeni delegation in the twenty third course for executive council for Islamic Organization of Education, Science, and Culture, Tehran, Republic of Iran.
34- A Member of the Yemeni delegation at "The Eighth Conference of the Islamic Education, Science, and Culture Organization". December 2003, Tehran, Islamic Republic of Iran.
35- 15 – 18 May 2004 A Member of Yemeni delegation in the fourth conference for Arab Ministers of Education, Beirut.
36- Participated in various international, regional, and local conferences and symposiums.
37- 2004/2005/2006 A Member of Yemeni delegation in the twenty fifth course of executive council for Islamic Organization of Educational, Scientific, and Cultural, Alrabat, Kingdom of morocco.
38- 14–19 June 2007 Participated in the fifth Roundtable for Women Ministers – Berlin.
39- Participated in "The Third Meeting of the Women Leaders Group". 28 September – 2 October 2007 – New York.
40- Head of the Yemeni delegation at the conference "Democracy and Human Rights", 2007, Cairo.
41- Head of the Yemeni delegation in the "Arab Giving Forum", 2008, Abu Dhabi.
42- Head of the Yemeni delegation to "The Seventh Session of the Human Rights Council", March 2008, Geneva.
43- Participated in the Conference of "Women Leaders" upon the invitation of the Minister of Foreign Affairs of Greece. May 2008, Athens, Greece.
44- Participated in the "Arab International Forum for Women", June 2008, Washington.
45- Participated in "The Second General Conference of the National Yemeni- American Assembly (NAYA). June 2008, Detroit – Michigan.
46- Participated in the Summit for "Women Pioneers". September 2008, NEW YORK.
47- Participated in The Regional Conference on Human Rights "The Sixtieth Anniversary of the Universal Declaration of Human Rights Between Reality and Ambition". December 2008, Cairo.
48- Participated in the “First Arab Conference for Human Rights". December 2008, Qatar.
49- Participated in “First National Conference on Criminal Justice". February 2008, Sana'a.
50- Head of delegation of Yemen to the “Tenth Session of The Human Rights Council". March 2009, Geneva.
51- Head of the delegation of Yemen in the activities of "The Fourth Meeting of the Supreme Council of the Arab Women's Organization". June 2009, Tunisia.
52- Head of the delegation of Yemen in the "Universal Periodic Review of Human Rights". May to September 2009, Geneva.
53- Head of the Yemeni delegation at the "International Conference on Human Rights – Immigration between North and South", 2009, Cairo.
54- Participated in the "Regional Symposium for Discussing The Draft Document of The (Protection of Human Dignity)". February 2010, Qatar.
55- Participated in "The International Women's Conference on Women's Rights". February 2010, Ankara.
56- Participated in the “Thirteenth Session of the Human Rights Council" March 2010, Geneva.
57- Participated in the “Second National Conference on Criminal Justice". June 2010, Sana'a.
58- Head of the delegation of Yemen at "The First International Conference for the Development of Human Rights Legislation". November 2010, Cairo.
59- Head of the Yemeni delegation in "The Fourth Arab Conference 'Senior-Level' of The Rights of The Child", December 2010, Marrakech.
60- Head of Delegation of Yemen to discuss the State Reports before the Committee on Economic, Social and Cultural Rights belong to the Human Rights Council. February 2011, Geneva.
61- Delivering the speech of Yemen in the Sixteenth Session (Senior-Level) of the Human Rights Council, March 2011, Geneva.
62- 17 Nov 2012: The Arab Spring and Constitutionalism in the Middle East, College of law, Fordham University

== Appreciation Certificates ==
1- Certificate of Appreciation from the Fifth economical conference, Economics and Administration College, Baghdad, Iraq.
2- Certificate of Appreciation from the Economics and Administration College, Al-Kufa University, Iraq.
3- Badge of Economics and Administration College, Al-Kufa University, Iraq.
4- Certificate of Appreciation from the second Yemeni economical conference, Sana'a.
5-The Scientific Superiority Certificate from the Ministry of Education.
6- Certificate of Appreciation from Yemeni Association for Consumer Protection in the second conference for Arab Association of Consumer Protection.
7- Certificate of Appreciation from Saba'a News Agency.
8- Other Certificates.

== Lectures in the following trends ==
1- Analyze the agricultural institutions activity.
2- Planning and organizing the agricultural production.
3- Agricultural Economy.
4- Agricultural production management.
5- Principles of partial and entire economy.
6- Useful Study of Economical Projects.
7- Full rural Development.
8- Environment Economies.

== See also ==
- Cabinet of Yemen
