= Attack on Amsterdam (1650) =

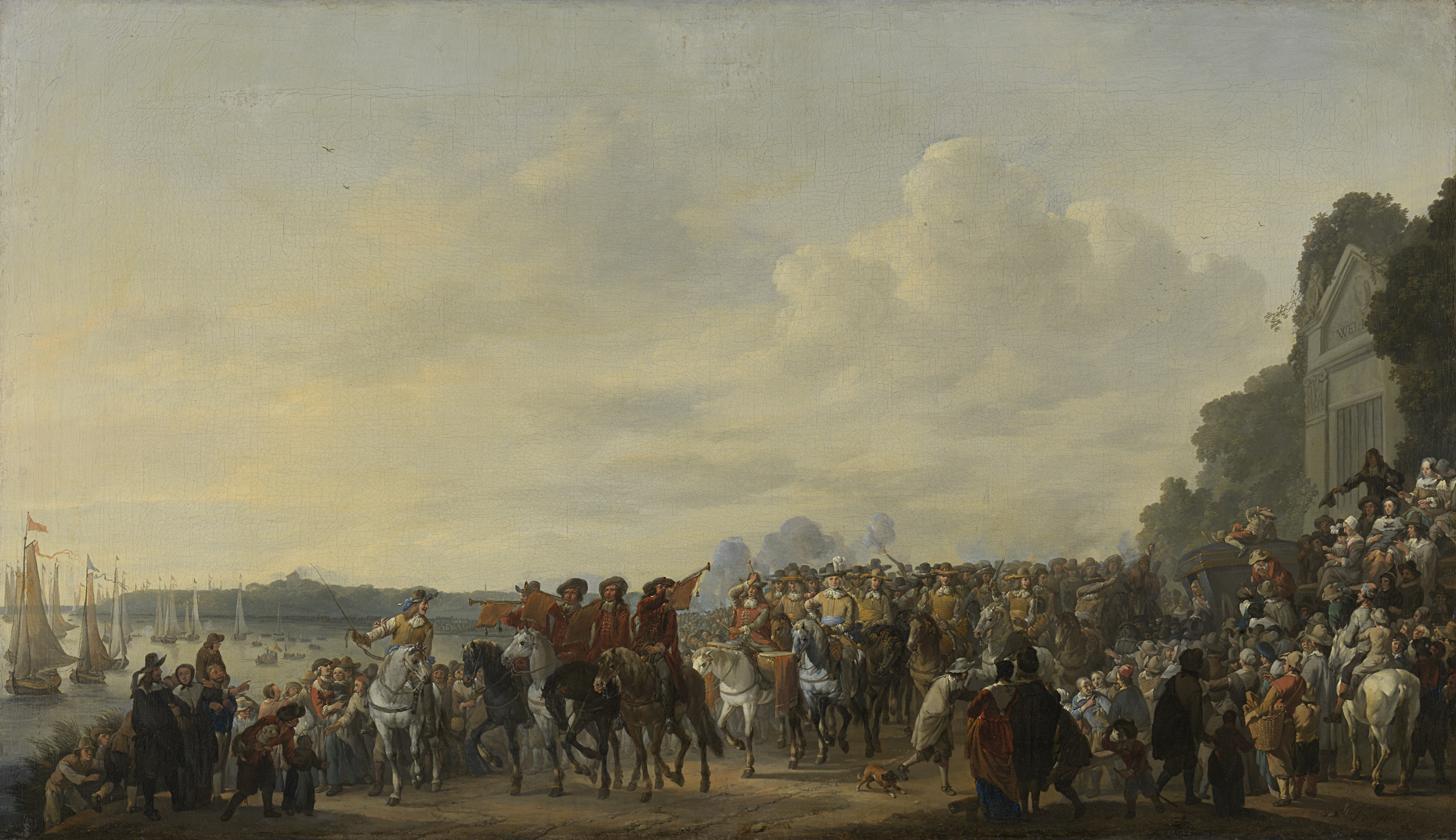
- This painting possibly shows princely troops along the Amstel river near Welna during William II's attack on Amsterdam.
Date	29 to 30 July 1650
Location	Amsterdam, Dutch Republic
Result	Failure to capture Amsterdam; Political aims of William II partly achieved

Belligerents
Amsterdam	(Dutch Republic) Orangists

Commanders and leaders
(Amsterdam) Cornelis Bicker (Amsterdam) Andries Bicker	(Dutch Republic) William II of Orange (Dutch Republic) William Frederick of Nassau-Dietz

The Attack on Amsterdam in July 1650 was part of a planned coup d'état by stadtholder William II, Prince of Orange to break the power of the regenten in the Dutch Republic, especially the County of Holland. The coup failed, because the army of the Frisian stadtholder William Frederick, Prince of Nassau-Dietz got lost on the way to Amsterdam in the rainy night of 29 to 30 July. It was discovered, and once the city had been warned, it had enough time to prepare for an attack. The attempted coup made the House of Orange extremely unpopular for a lengthy period of time, and was one of the main reasons for the origins of the First Stadtholderless Period (1650–1672).

== Background ==
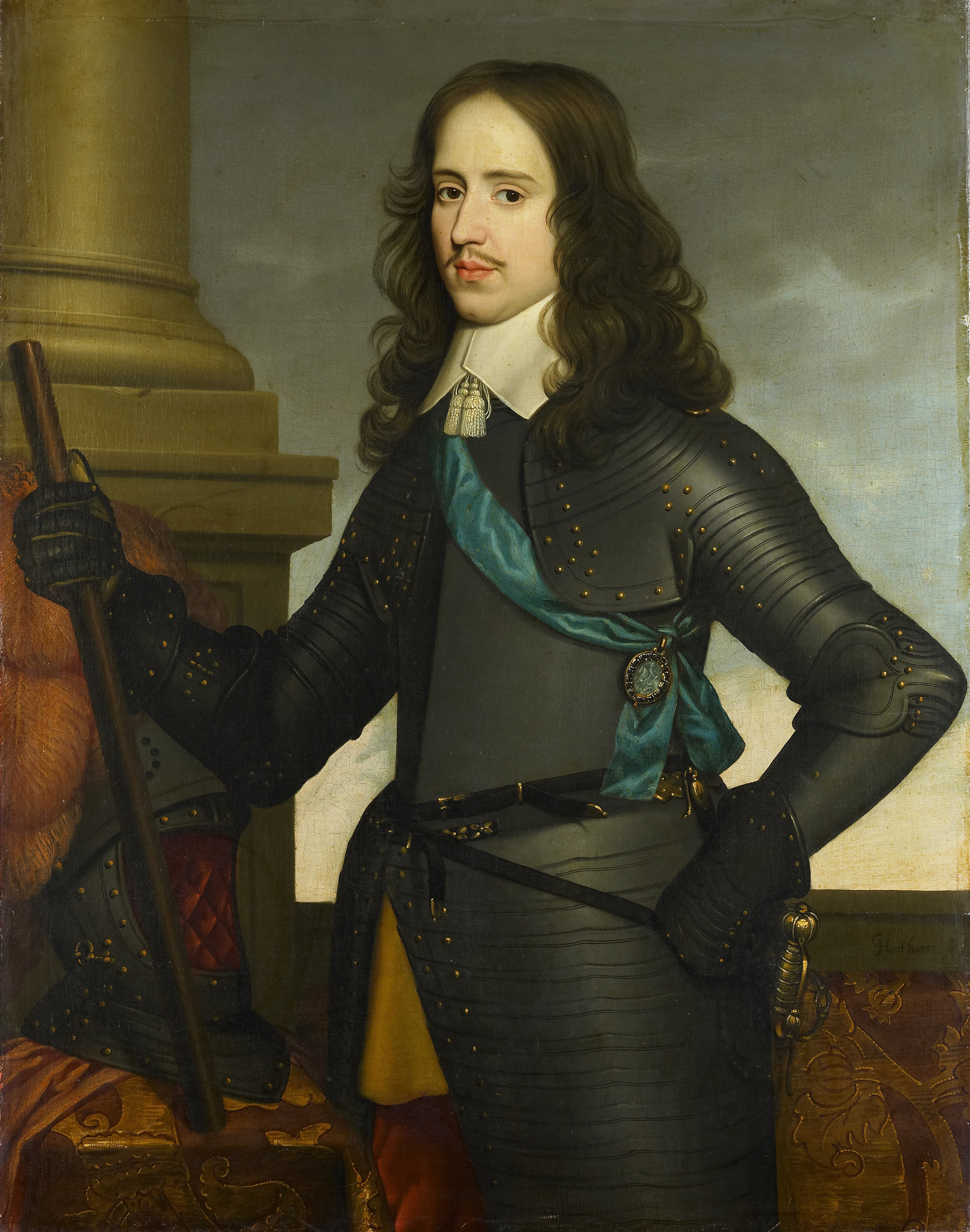

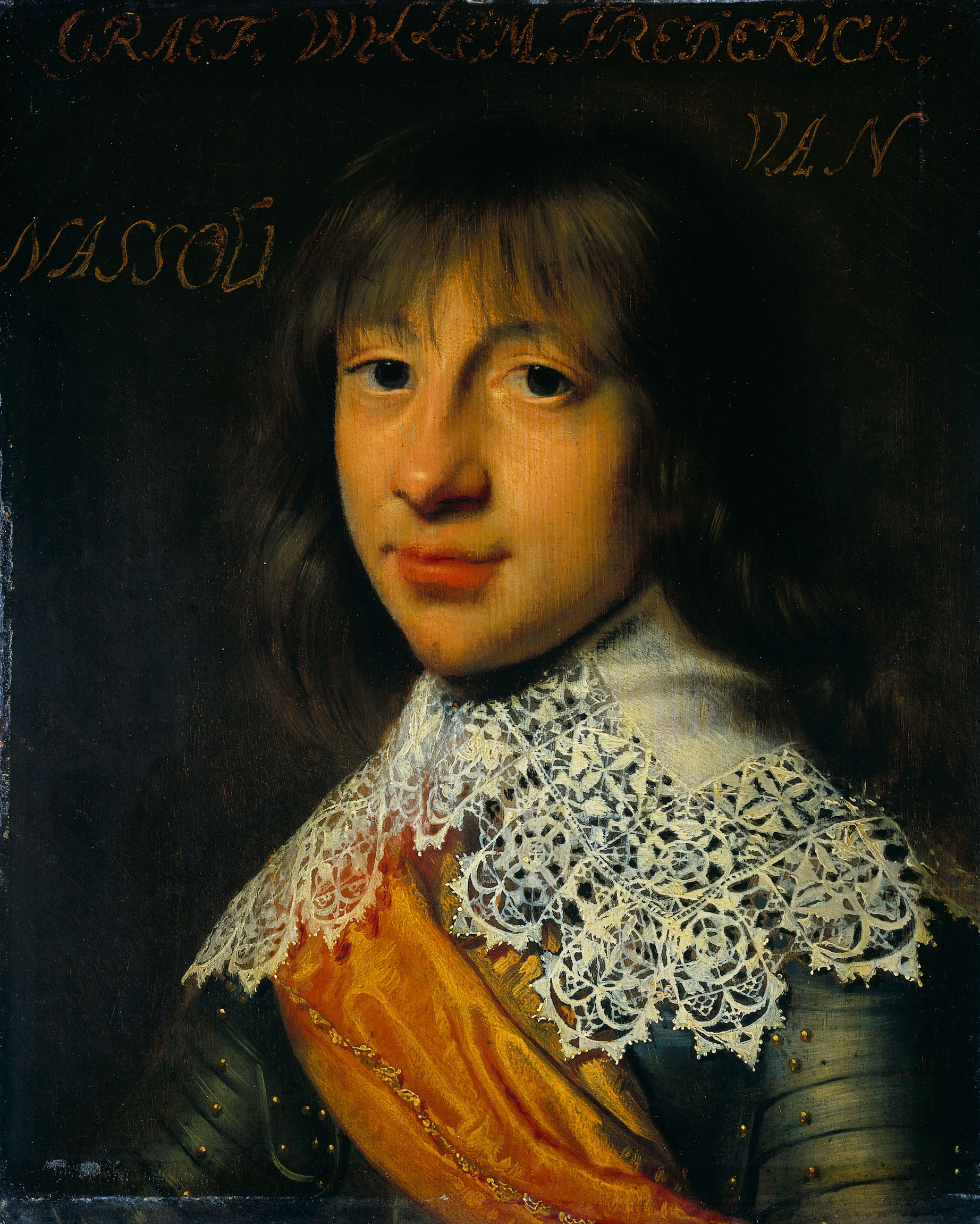

Stadtholders William II and William Frederick jointly devised the dual coup d'état.

The cause of the conflict lay in a dispute on ending the Eighty Year's War. The provinces of Utrecht and Zeeland and stadtholder William II wanted to continue the war: Utrecht for more favourable peace terms, Zeeland to keep blocking the Flemish ports for commercial ships, and William II because military achievements gave him more prestige and power. The other provinces, led by Holland, preferred peace to secure trade and reduce army upkeep costs. The latter eventually had their way when the Peace of Münster was signed on 30 January 1648.

Early 1649, the army still consisted of 35,000 mercenaries, and Holland (especially the dominant city of Amsterdam under burgomaster Andries Bicker, head of the Bickerse league) wanted to reduce their number to 26,000. After negotiations, a compromise was reached, and 29,250 troops were left by summer. William II, however, was keen on leading a punitive expedition to England, where his father-in-law, king Charles I, had been decapitated on 30 January 1649, and the republic had been proclaimed; whilst the States of Holland urged to reduce the number of troops even further.

William II devised plans to get his way. At the end of 1649, a false pamphlet later known as The Eleven Articles (De elf artikelen) was widely distributed, claiming that Amsterdam under the rule of the Bicker family was in league with England and intended to strike the other six provinces and everyone in Holland who opposed Amsterdam. It is thought that William II had this rumour spread to win sympathy for his cause against Amsterdam. He wanted to execute his plans in the spring of 1650, stemming from his astrological belief that the position of the Moon, Mars and Saturn would be favourable for a change of government, but eventually he would not act until summer. In May 1650, the States of Holland decided with 11 votes to 8 to disband the troops, and henceforth refused to pay part of the remaining soldiers' salary. The States General called the resolution of Holland illegal, landing the Republic in a political crisis. The States General argued that defence was a duty of the entire Union, and not of the constituent provinces: Holland should pay its due. Morally supported by the States General, William II first decided to appoint a commission (with himself as its chairman) that would visit the cities of Holland to plead for a large army, but without success. Then he resorted to coercion.

== Failed coup d'état ==
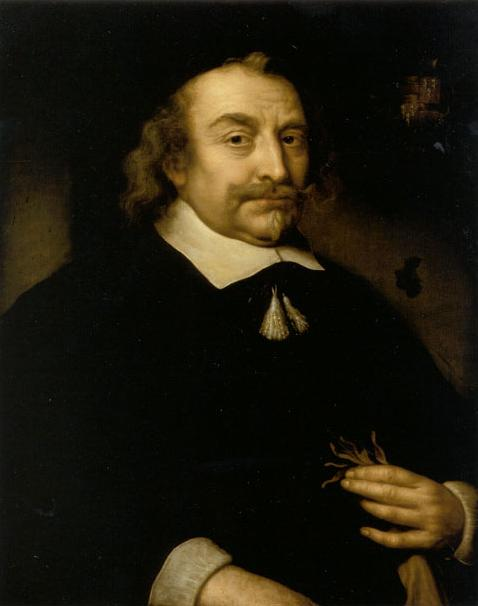

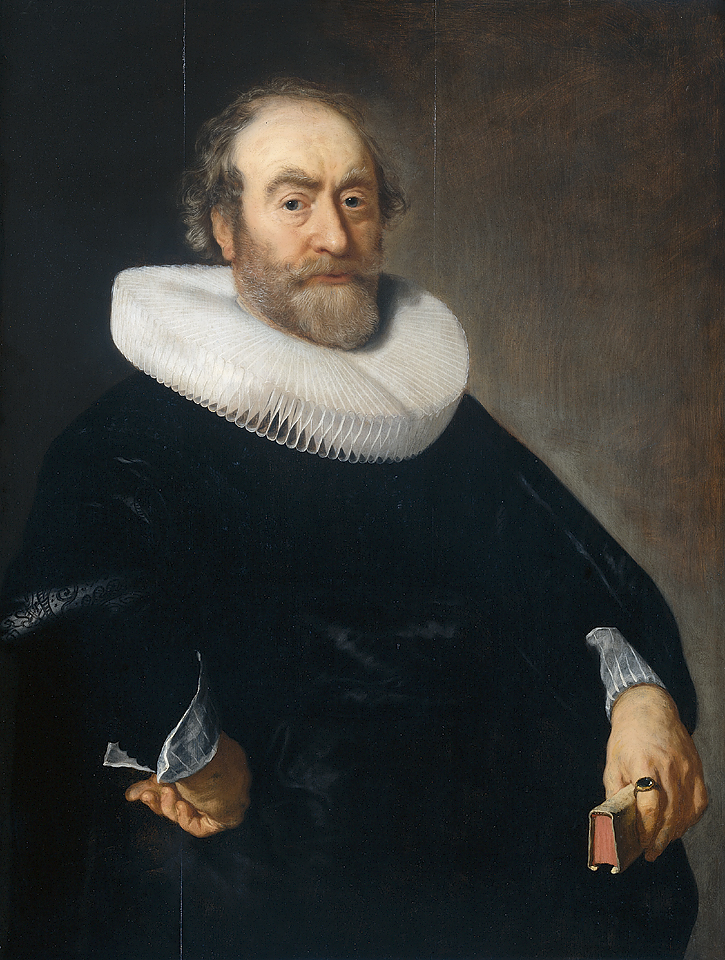

Regenten Cornelis and Andries Bicker readied Amsterdam's defences in time for a siege.

The Frisian stadtholder William Frederick of Nassau-Dietz advanced across the Veluwe in the night of 29 July on the orders of William II. He headed for Amsterdam to take the city by surprise, and to force it to pay the soldiers' wages. Two of the three companies, under Cornelis van Aerssen and Frederick van Dohna-Carwinden, lost the trail in the middle of the rainy night on the misty heath near Hilversum. A postman from Hamburg heading for Amsterdam ran into the forces, and warned Gerard Andriesz. Bicker (1622–1666), the drost of Muiden, who immediately left for Amsterdam to inform his uncle, burgemeester Cornelis Bicker. The latter and former burgemeester Andries Bicker rallied the city guard, hired 2,000 mercenaries, lifted the bridges, closed the gates and positioned the artillery. Not until 9 o'clock in the morning the stadtholderian troops reached Abcoude. Now that a rushed entry was made impossible, they camped on the outskirts. An attack was postponed for the time being.

Meanwhile, William II had six prominent members of the States of Holland arrested. The delegates from Haarlem, Delft, Hoorn, Medemblik, and Dordrecht (Jacob de Witt), were abducted under a strict guard to Loevestein Castle, some accompanied by their servants or their sons.

On 3 August, there were seventy companies under William Frederick's command near Abcoude. Burgemeester Cornelis Bicker took on Amsterdam's defence. William decided to negotiate with the Oetgens faction, opponents of the regenten family Bicker. On the condition that Andries and Cornelis Bicker would be put out of their offices, William would be prepared to withdraw his troops.

== Aftermath ==
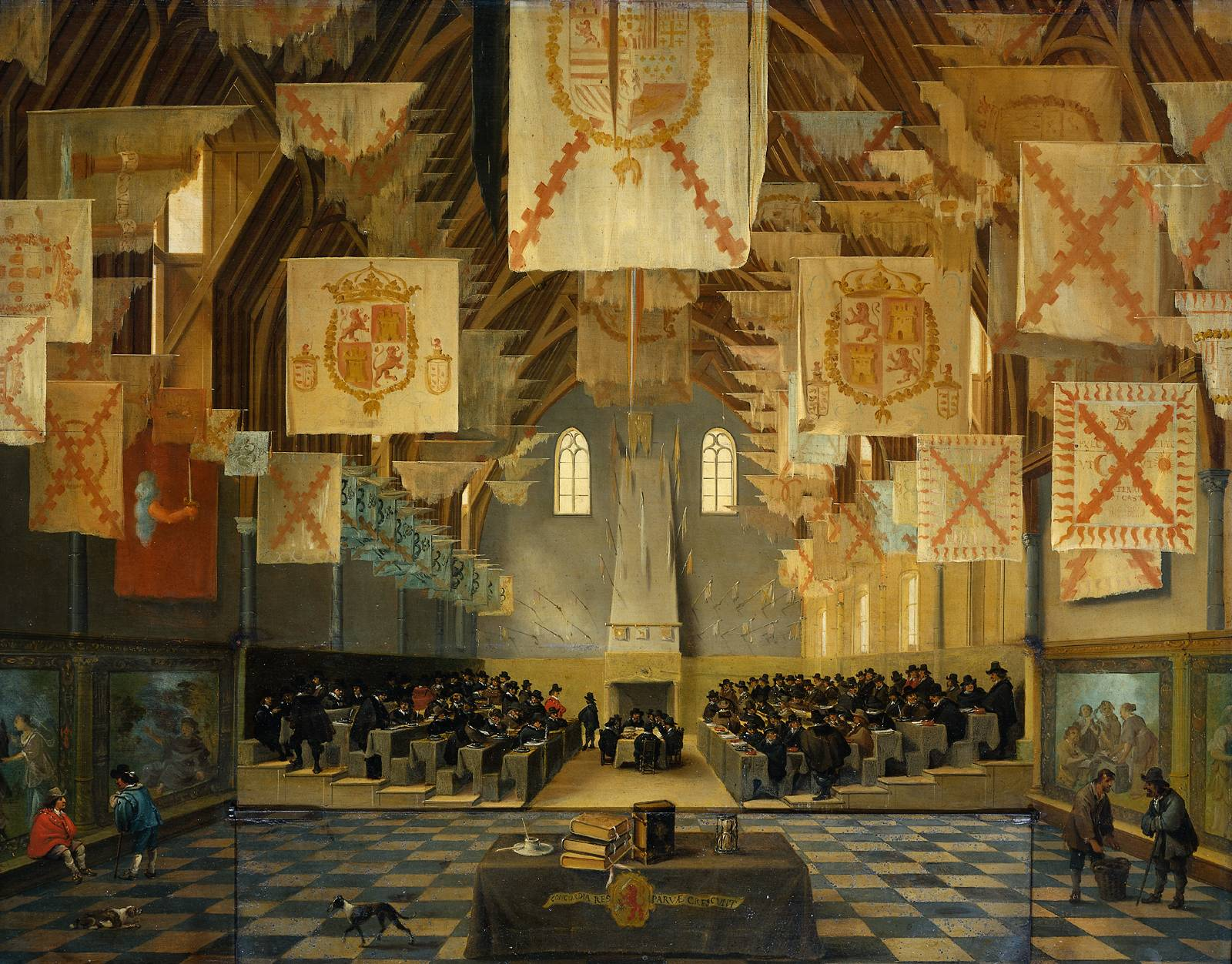
The Grand Assembly of 1651 decided to appoint no new stadtholder, commencing the First Stadtholderless Period.

The coup was largely a failure because the attack on Amsterdam did not succeed. Under pressure of the States, the Loevesteinian regenten were released one by one from 17 to 22 August. The regenten now realised that the stadtholder was prepared to use violence to maintain and expand his power. This led to the rise of the so-called Loevestein faction amongst regenten who desired a republic without Orange. Before 1650, few had taken an interest in justifying or altering the form of government of the Dutch Republic, and the role of the stadtholderate within it (Hugo Grotius was an exception to this; his On the Antiquity of the Batavian Republic (1610) primarily attempted the first). At Leiden University, professors even taught to their students that a moderate monarchy was the best form of government. After William II's attempted coup of July 1650, however, these attitudes would change radically.

After the failed attack burgomaster Cornelis de Graeff passed on a message from William II that Cornelis and Andries Bicker must resign from their posts on the Vroedschap. As result Andries Bicker was purged from the Vroedschap, as was his brother Cornelis Bicker, as one of the conditions of the treaty that followed, led by De Graeff and burgomaster Joan Huydecoper van Maarsseveen.

On 6 November, William II unexpectedly died of smallpox aged 24. On 22 November the Bickers were restored in their posts. Shortly after on 14 November, princess-widow Mary Henrietta Stuart gave birth to a son, the later king-stadtholder William III. After the sudden passing of William II, Groningen and Drenthe decided to appoint William Frederick as their stadtholder as well. However, his attempts to have the other provinces recognise him as the regent of William III did not work out (only in Overijssel he was accepted as such by two-thirds of the province). With the failed stadtholderian coup still in fresh memory, the lack of a stadtholder was a welcome turn of events. Thus, the rest of the Republic entered the First Stadtholderless Period. During the Grand Assembly of 1651, these five provinces definitively agreed not to appoint a new stadtholder.

In the Act of Seclusion, a secret clause that was a peace condition for the Dutch defeat in the First Anglo-Dutch War (1652–54), the States of Holland also promised The Protectorate to never appoint William III as stadtholder, and in his Deduction the Loevesteinian leader Johan de Witt would successfully defend this deal in the States General. This situation remained in force until the Rampjaar (1672).
