= Joan Huydecoper van Maarsseveen =

Joan Huydecoper van Maarsseveen may refer to:

- Joan Huydecoper van Maarsseveen (1599–1661)
- Joan Huydecoper II (1625–1704), his son
