= Joan Huydecoper van Maarsseveen (1599–1661) =

Dutch merchant and property developer (1599–1661)

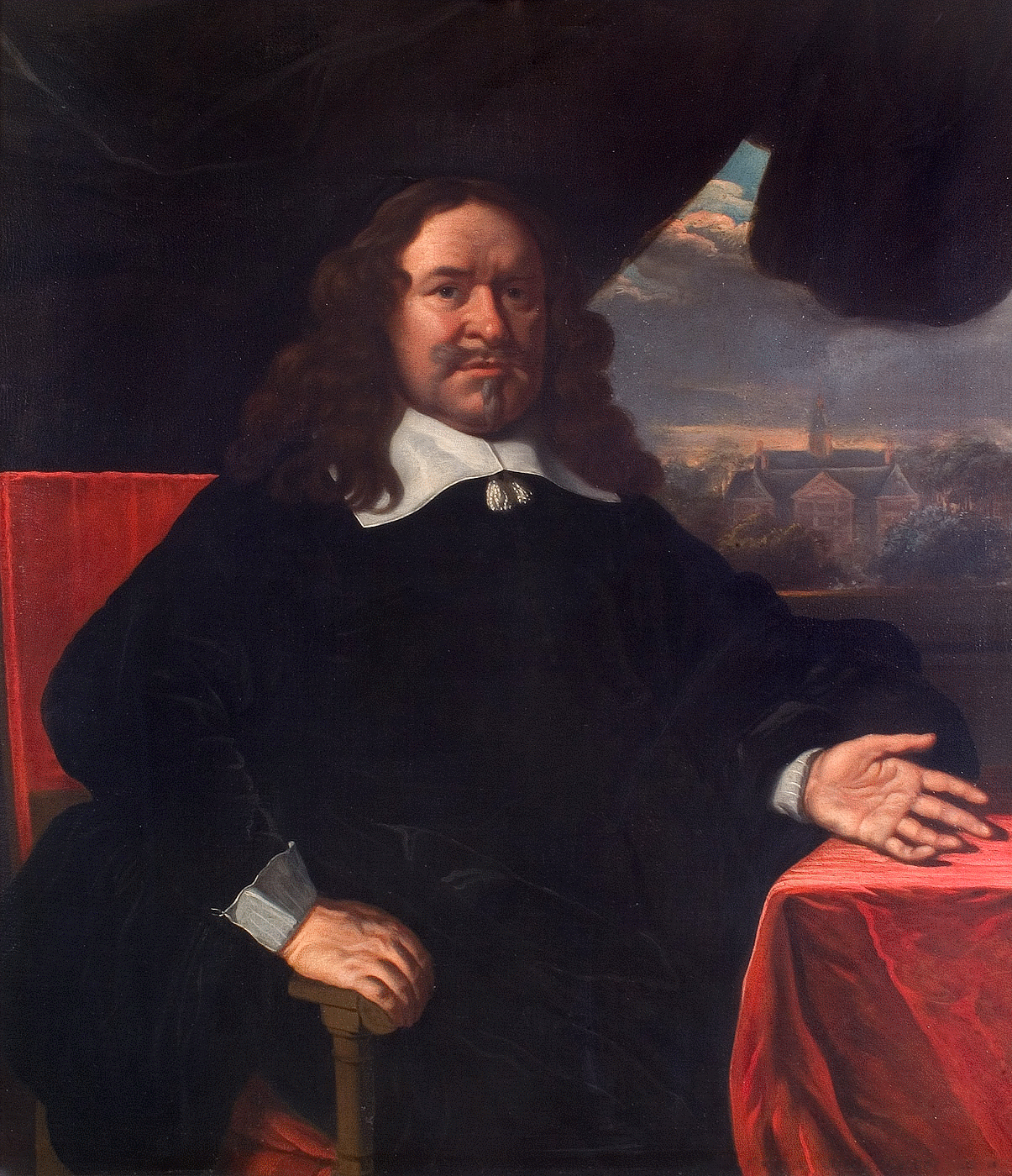
Portrait of Joan Huydecoper van Maarsseveen (copy after Bartholomeus van der Helst; 1660)

Joan or Johan Huydecoper van Maarsseveen (1599-October 26, 1661), knighted lord of Maarsseveen, was an important merchant, financial expert, property developer active in Amsterdam and a director of the Dutch East India Company during the Dutch Golden Age. The republican-minded Huydecoper was an influential member of the Dutch States Party, diplomat and six times mayor of Amsterdam. He was, together with Cornelis de Graeff, one of the initiators of the construction of the new town hall of Amsterdam and was a prominent patron of the arts and art collector. Beside Maarsseveen he held the feudal titles of Neerdijk, Thamen and Blockland. Huydecoper is representative of the love of art, political influence and welfare in the Golden Age.

== Life ==
=== Origin, early years and family ===
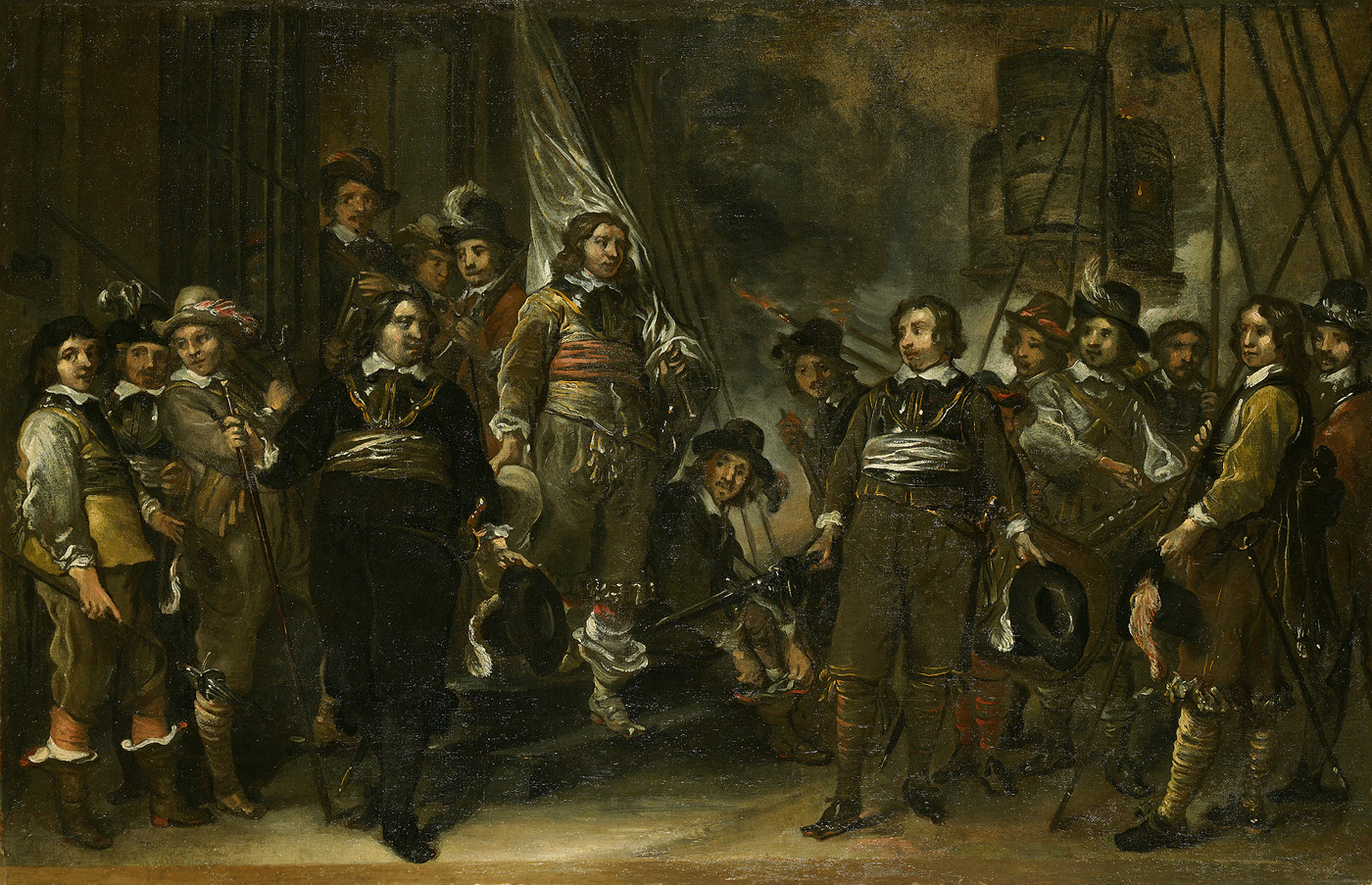
SA 41181-Schets voor een schuttersstuk-Viering van de Vrede van Munster door de schutterij van Jan Huydecoper (voorstudie)

Joan was born in Amsterdam as the son of Jan Jacobsz Bal Huydecoper van Wieringen and Elisabeth van Gemen. The Dutch-language name Huydecoper means 'buyer of pelts'. His father was a tanner and pelt trader in Amsterdam and held positions as counsil and alderman of Amsterdam. In 1602, he was one of the first investors in the Dutch East India Company. In 1616 he owned shares in the Magelhaense Compagnie (Magellan Company), which traded with South America. Joan Huydecoper took over the family tannery, pelt and armament trading business. He invested in property all over the city, but especially on Uilenburg, behind his house. In 1622 he bought a lot in the Jordaan, where he had seven houses built, three of which along the Lauriergracht.

In 1621 he married Elisabeth de Bisschop, who died a year later. (Elisabeth was a daughter of councilor Jan de Bisschop. Jan's youngest sister, Lysbeth, was the sister-in-law of the Remonstrant foreman Simon Bisschop). He remairred with Maria Coijmans, the daughter of Balthasar Coymans. The couple had following children:

1. Joan Huydecoper van Maarsseveen (1625-1704), Amsterdam regent and burgomaster
2. Maria Huydecoper (1627-1658), married in 1642 with Jacob F. Hinlopen
3. Eleonora Huydecoper (1631-1663) married in 1657 with Jan J. Hinlopen
4. Geertruid Huydecoper (1634—1669), married David d'Ablaing (1622-1672)
5. Constantia Huydecoper (1636-1702), married in 1668 with the predicant Albertus van Westerhoff (1633-1702)
6. Elisabeth Huydecoper (1638-1703), married 1670 to Pieter van Wickevoort (1629-1721)
7. Jacoba Sophia Huydecoper (1640-1714) married in 1675 Aernout Druyvesteyn (1641-1698), mecenas and burgomaster of Haarlem

=== Career ===
==== Patron of arts ====
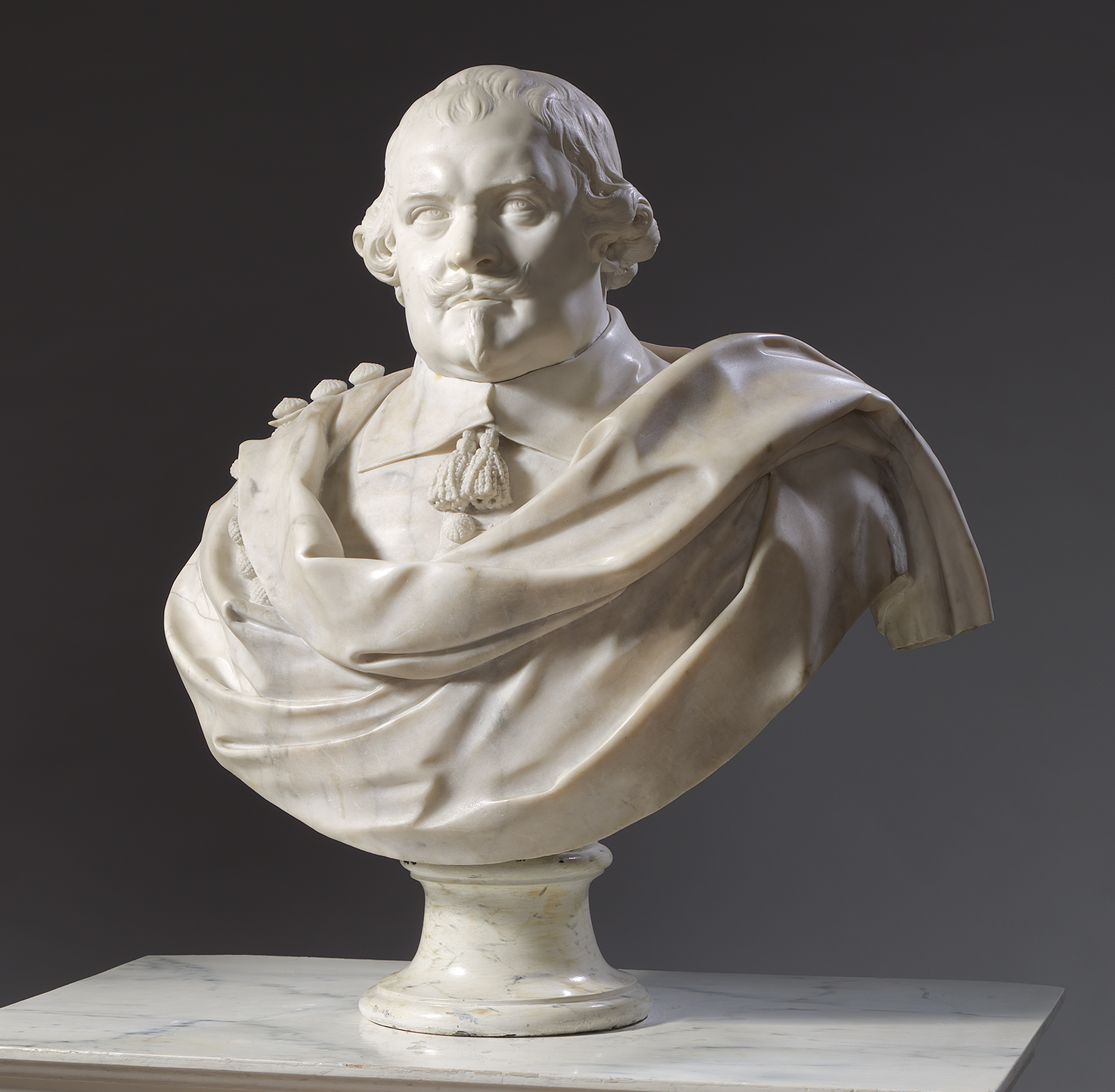
Portrait bust of Joan Huydecoper by Artus Quellinus the Elder

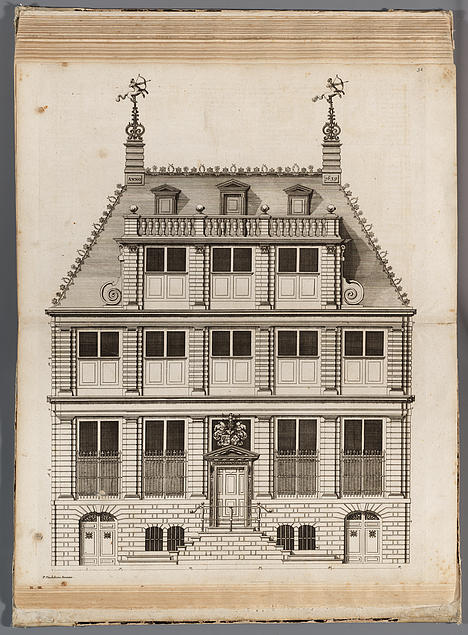
The mansion of Johan Huydecoper van Maarsseveen, at Singel 539

Johan Huydecoper was an important patron and collector of art. Huydecoper became a connoisseur of fine arts and was friendly with Jan Vos. He was already an art collector in his youth, and in 1628 he is mentioned as the first person in Amsterdam who bought a painting from Rembrandt. Huydecoper and Rembrandt lived or worked at the same time in the Sint Antoniesbreestraat, where many artists stayed at the time. Vos praised his town house and his collection of paintings, one on a painting by Rubens, in several poems. He was a patron of Govert Flinck and Bartholomeus van der Helst, who portrayed him. In 1639, Philip Vingboons designed his mansion on Singel; the house was destroyed in 1943 when two English planes collided in midair and one came down on the house. (One of the few spots in Amsterdam that were damaged during the Second World War).

==== Political activities ====
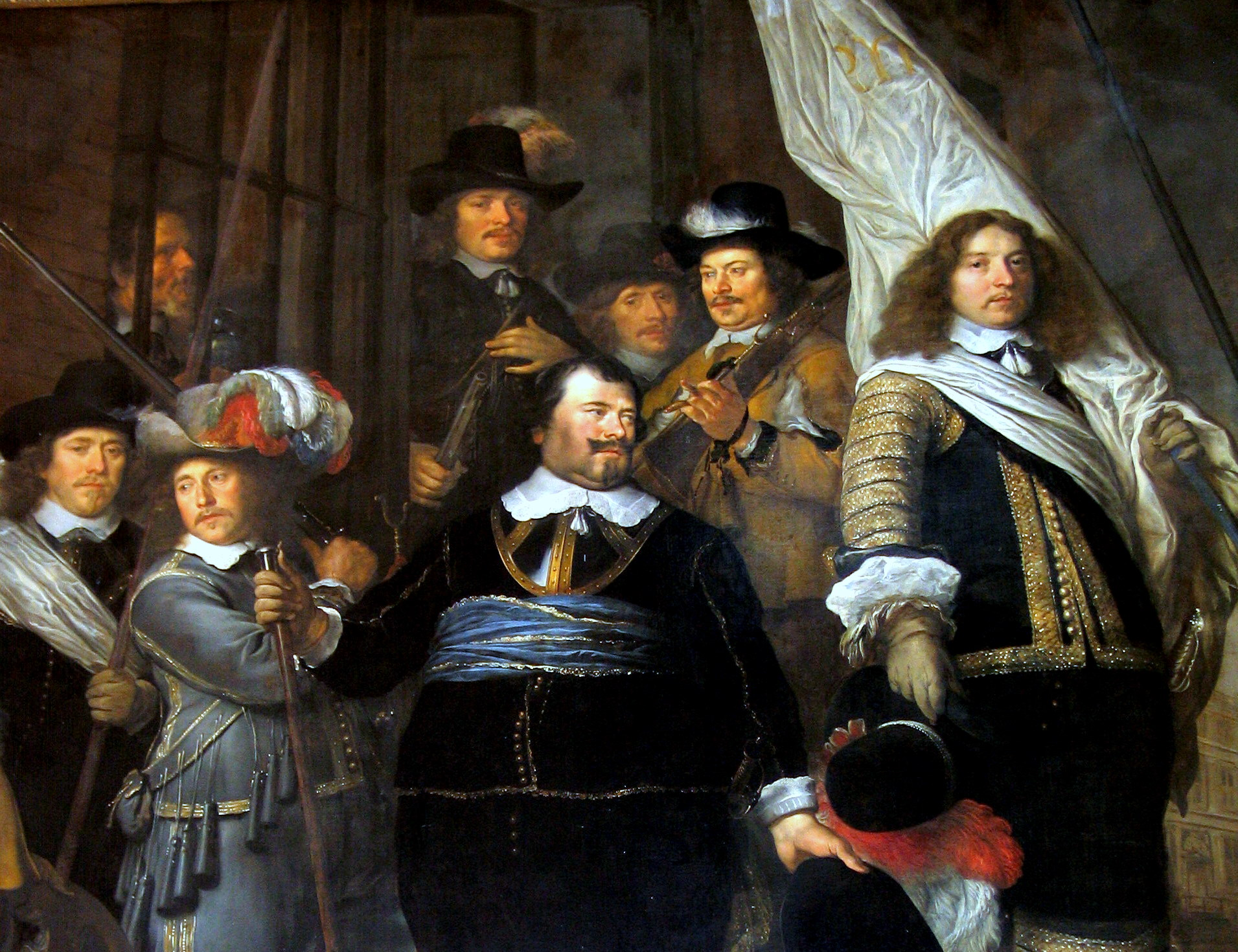
Huydecoper as an officer of the civic guard by Govert Flinck in the Amsterdams Historisch Museum

Joan Huydecoper started his important political career as a protégé of burgomaster Jacob Dircksz de Graeff when he was elected to the Vroedschap of Amsterdam in 1631. In 1634 he was appointed director of the Dutch East India Company, the consolidated Dutch trading company founded by the government of the Dutch Republic. Huydecoper was also a real-estate developer along the river Vecht (Utrecht), where he had his country house. Art historian Gary Schwartz wrote: "What art could contribute to Maarsseveen: architecture to beautify it, map-making to advertise it, and poetry to immortalise it. He used the patronage he wielded in Amsterdam to put artists scholars, and publishers to work for him in Maarsseveen". In 1637 he get knighted by the swedish queen Christina and in 1640 he bought the heerlijkheid Maarsseveen from the States of Utrecht. Huydecoper van Maarsseveen was also included in the Order of Saint Michael, which means that he had made himself useful to the King or France. The reason is as yet unclear. At the end of the 1640s he was together with his second cousin Cornelis de Graeff one of the initiators of the construction of the new town hall Op de Dam of Amsterdam and together with his other relative Andries de Graeff he was involved in the decoration of it.

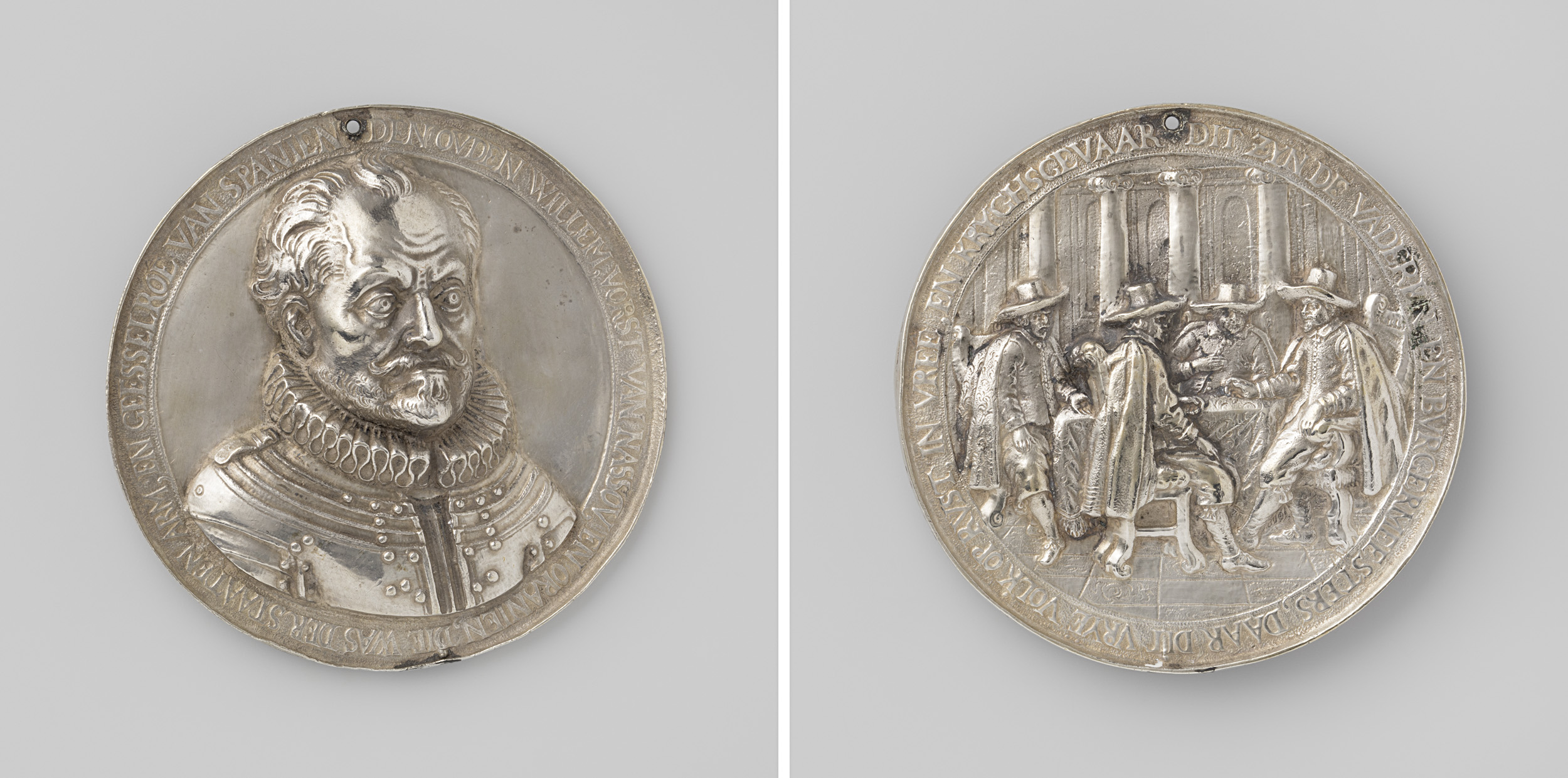
William I and the mayoral council of Amsterdam: William the Silent (prins van Oranje), Cornelis de Graeff, heer van Zuid-Polsbroek, Joan Huydecoper van Maarseveen Jan van de Poll (1597-1678) and Hendrick Dircksz. Spiegel. (silver penning by Wouter Muller, 1655)

In 1650 Huydecoper van Maarsseveen was involved in the dispute between the stadtholder William II of Orange and the Bicker family. Burgomaster Cornelis Bicker commissioned Huydecoper van Maarsseveen, together with the Amsterdam schout Simon van der Does, to present the serious intentions of defending the city to the Oranger. The brothers Andries and Cornelis Bicker closed the gates, lifted the bridges, and protect the city, when William II of Orange tried to attack Amsterdam. The attack failed and as a result Andries and Cornelis Bicker where purged from the Vroedschap, as one of the conditions of the treaty that followed, led by Cornelis de Graeff and Huydecoper van Maarsseveen. After the death of Willem II later that year the First Stadtholderless Period began.

In 1651 Huydecoper van Maarsseveen was appointed burgomaster of Amsterdam the first time. During his office as a burgomaster, he chose the side of Cornelis de Graeff. 1654/54 he was a councilor of the Admiralty of Amsterdam. His further appointments as burgomaster followed 1654, 1655, 1657, 1659 and 1660. As a burgomaster he made several diplomatic Trips. In 1653 he went to Lübeck and he represented the city in 1655 at the baptism of the son of Frederick William of Brandenburg together with his son Joan and Pieter de Graeff, and in 1660 at the coronation of Charles II of England.

Huydecoper van Maarsseveen symbolises the prosperity of Amsterdam during the Golden Age and managed to unify wealth, politics, and the cultural elite status in Amsterdam.
