= Jan Vos (poet) =

Dutch playwright and poet (1612–1667)

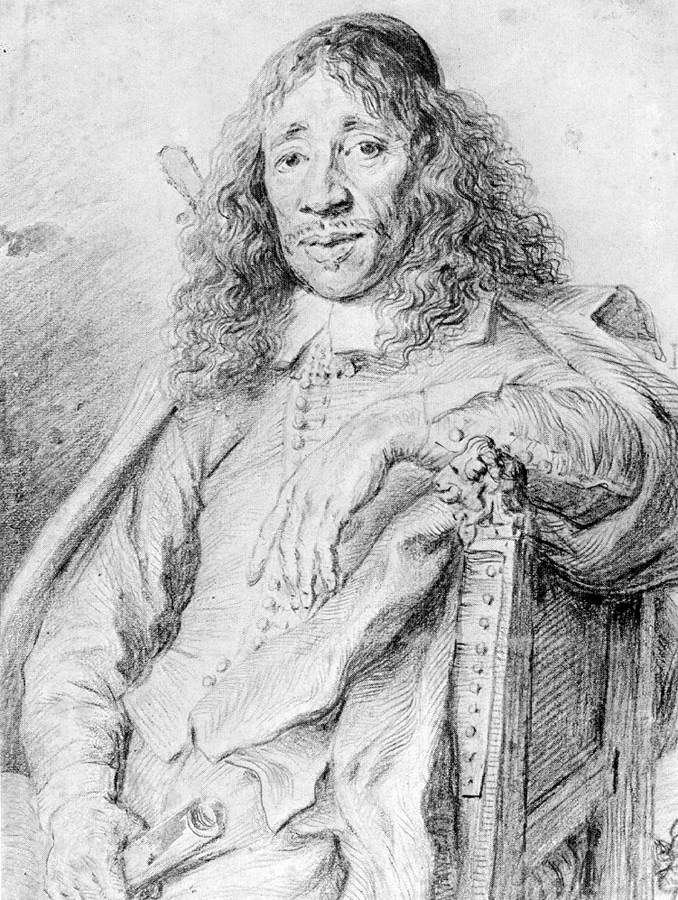
Portrait of Poet Jan Vos by Jan Lievens.

Jan Jansz. Vos (baptised 4 March 1612 in Amsterdam – buried 12 July 1667 in Amsterdam) was a Dutch playwright and poet. A glassmaker by trade (in that position he provided all windows for the new city hall on the Dam), he also played an important role as stage-manager and director of the theatre. He organized, on the mayors' orders, processions and splendid decorated floats, which sometimes drew disapproval, criticism, and derision.

== Life ==
On 20 February 1639, at the old City Hall of Amsterdam, he married Grietje Gerrets (1616 - 1651), already pregnant by him. They had two children: Jan (who only lived a few days) and Maria (who in 1664 laid the first stone for the new theatre). Jan Vos was of good family and lived in the Kalverstraat at no. 202. He prided himself on knowing no other languages than Dutch. With his Aran and Titus of 1641 his name, previously all but unknown, was made. Casper van Baerle admired the work, despite, or because, it featured a prince served as a pudding, a baked Moor and some apparitions. (The subject is the same as in Shakespeare's Titus Andronicus).

In his Klucht van Oene ("The Farce of Oene", 1642), a number of dishonest practices by Amsterdam merchants and industrialists are criticized - bakers of bread short-selling their customers, tailors filching pieces of cloth owned by their patrons, glassmakers cheating with glass quantities, dyers of silk tampering with their material. In addition, house-agents, pawnbrokers, cashiers, notaries public and secretaries, landlords, millers, doctors, barbers, pharmacists and booksellers enter the stage.

Jan Vos was a sought-after table companion of such leading families as those of De Graeff, Bicker, Joan Huydecoper van Maarsseveen and Jan Six. He wrote occasional poems for them, and this has led to his often being characterized as "a family poet". One of his huge patrons was burgomaster Andries de Graeff. In 1651 he was among the compilers of the Verscheyde Nederduytse gedichten ("Sundry Poems in Dutch") collection of poems, an attempt to bring together painters and poets of different schools and religions. In 1657, he was an honoured guest at the marriage of Jan J. Hinlopen and Leonora Huydecoper.

Jan Vos was head of the Theatre of Van Campen for nineteen years, together with Tobias van Domselaer and Johannes Serwouters. Vos was part of the Muiderkring, a group of literary people meeting at a castle where the a member of the Bicker family had been appointed "drost" (keeper of the castle). He directed plays by Vondel.

Jan Vos had a good eye for the public taste, and was repeatedly entrusted by the city authorities with designing and overseeing pageants and spectacles. In 1654, Vos organized ten performances celebrating the Treaty of Westminster. In 1659, Amalia van Solms, the Regent's wife, and her daughter visited Amsterdam, seeing twenty performances especially designed for the occasions. Nicolas Tulp, however, vehemently opposed the appearance of pagan gods and goddesses during the visitors' festive arrival. At the visit of Maria Henrietta Stuart, the widow of William II, it turned out that one of the floats represented the beheading of Charles I of England, Mary's late father. Jan Vos, who led the processions on horseback, became a target for criticism.
