= Treaty of Raalte =

1657 treaty of the Dutch Republic

The Treaty of Raalte was signed on 1 October 1657 by Willem III and resulted in Willem giving up the stadtholdership of Overijssel, which is a province located in what is currently the central-eastern part of the Netherlands. The conflict resolved by this treaty featured two opposing groups of towns in Overijssel: one group met at the town of Zwolle, while the other met in the town of Deventer. The mediators who negotiated this settlement were Johan de Witt and Cornelis de Graeff.

== See also ==
- List of treaties
