= Cornelis de Graeff =

Regent and Mayor of Amsterdam (1599–1664)

Cornelis de Graeff van Polsbroek
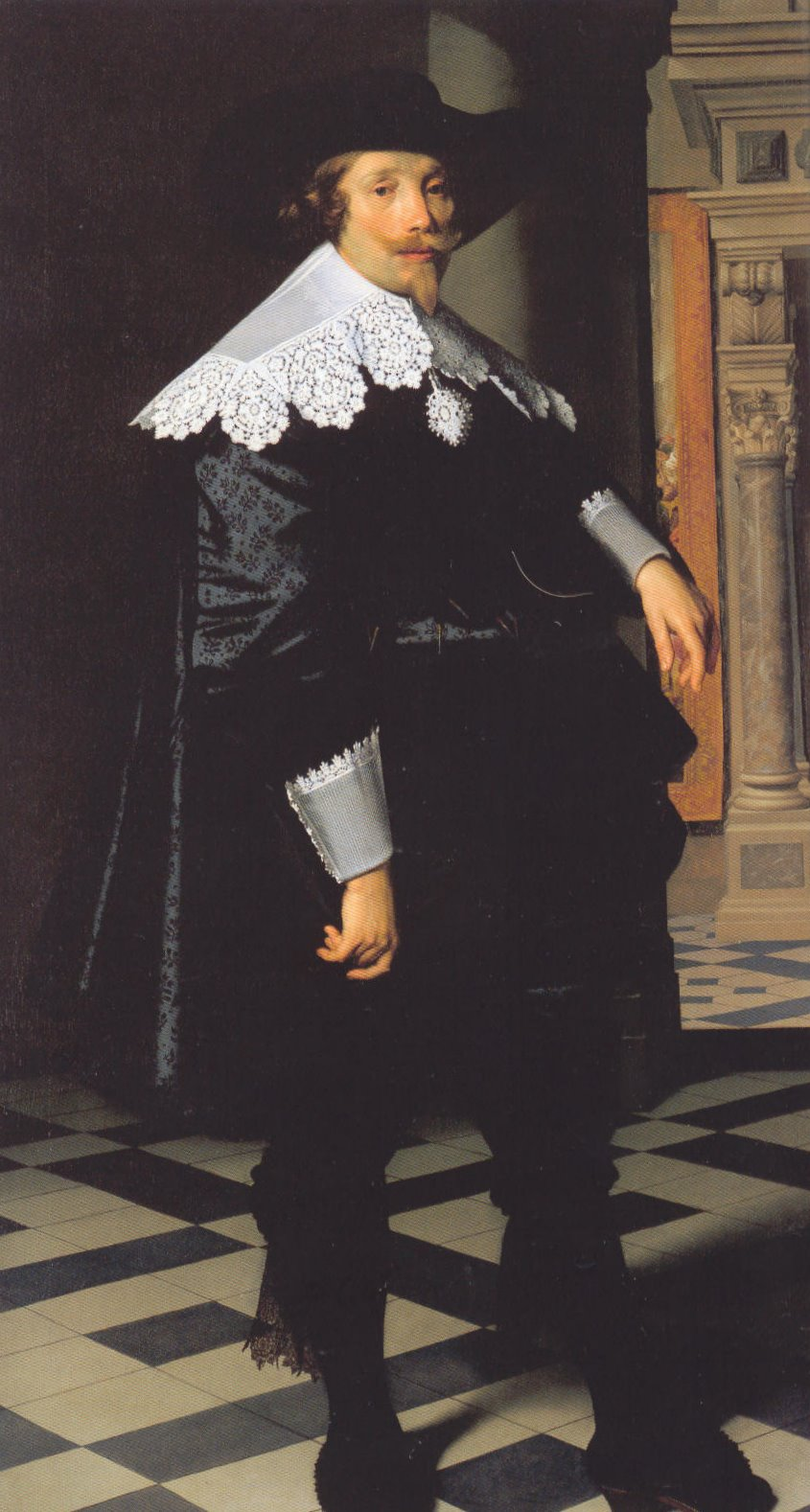
- Portrait by Nicolaes Eliaszoon Pickenoy, (1636), Gemäldegalerie, Berlin

Regent and Mayor of Amsterdam
- Reign: 1643–1664
- Predecessor: Andries Bicker
- Successor: Andries de Graeff

President of the Dutch East Indies Company
- Reign: 1646–1664
- Predecessor: Andries Bicker
- Successor: Pieter de Graeff
- Born: 15 October 1599; House De Keyser, Amsterdam
- Died: 30 January 1664 (aged 64)
- Burial: Oude Kerk, Amsterdam
- Spouse: 1) Geertruid Overlander van Purmerland; 2) Catharina Hooft
- Issue: Pieter de Graeff; Jacob de Graeff Other relations Andries de Graeff (brother); Andries Bicker (cousin); Jan de Witt (nephew); Frans Banninck Cocq (brother in law via Catharina); Pieter Corneliszoon Hooft (uncle)
- House: De Graeff
- Father: Jacob Dircksz de Graeff
- Mother: Aeltje Boelens Loen

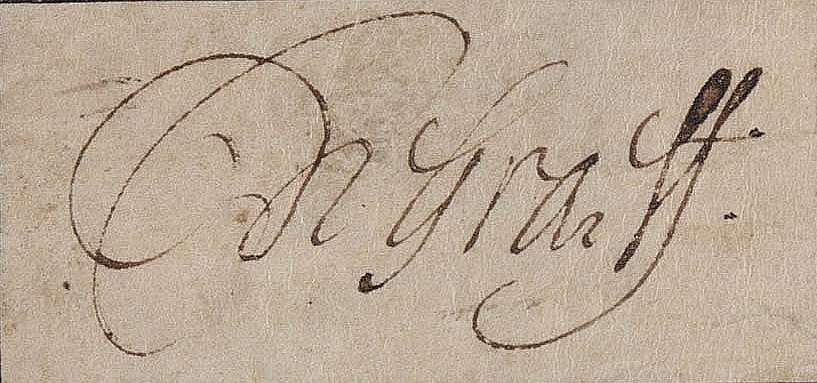
Signature of Cornelis de Graeff

Cornelis de Graeff (15 October 1599 – 4 May 1664), often named Polsbroek or de heer van (lord) Polsbroek during his lifetime, was an influential regent and Burgemeester (Borough Master or Mayor) of Amsterdam, statesman and diplomat of Holland and the Republic of the United Netherlands at the height of the Dutch Golden Age. He was the most illustrious member of the De Graeff family, which in the Golden Age originally held political power together with the Bicker family and by marriage in Amsterdam Holland and finally the Dutch Republic.

De Graeff belonged to the republican political movement also referred to as the state oriented, the Dutch States Party, as opposed to the Orangisten and opponent of the political ambitions of the House of Orange. He was one of the leading figures who sought to end the Eighty Years' War between the United Netherlands and the Kingdom of Spain, which took place in 1648 with the Peace of Münster. Inside Amsterdam De Graeff became the moderate successor to his ultra-republican cousin Andries Bicker. In the following era after the sudden death of stadholder William II of Orange, the First Stadtholderless Period, which was promoted by De Graeff, he and his nephew Grand pensionary Johan de Witt were regarded as the leading republican protagonists.

The progressive cooperation between De Graeff and his protégé, De Witt, was an important political axis that ordered the political system within the republic. Both belonged now to the two republican and state-minded families where political power within Holland rested primarily with. In Amsterdam this lay with the brothers Cornelis and Andries de Graeff, and in The Hague with the brothers Cornelis and Johan de Witt. Until his death in 1664, De Graeff was Amsterdam's leading politician, then the republican center of the republic. However, he not only had the interests of these in mind, but also those of Holland and the political settlement with the other provinces.

De Graeff was considered a prudent and skilful statesman and diplomat who was concerned about the balance between the religious and political factions and was held in high esteem by the population. His political stance was characteristic of his family: on the one hand libertine and state-minded, on the other hand, if only to a limited extent, loyal to the House of Orange. The proponents of the De Graeff family has shown they had an eye for national politics and tried to find some balance between the House of Orange and the Republicans. They were against too much influence of the church on political issues. After his death, his younger brother Andries de Graeff continued the De Graeff faction and its republican and more liberal politics. Like his brother, Andries De Graeff, he was an art collector and patron of the arts. De Graeff was Free Lord of Zuidpolsbroek, Ambachtsheer (Lord of the manor) of Sloten, Sloterdijk, Nieuwer-Amstel, Osdorp and Amstelveen and acted as President of the Dutch East Indies Company.

== Family De Graeff ==
=== Origin ===
Cornelis de Graeff was the oldest son of Jacob Dircksz de Graeff, burgomaster of Amsterdam and Vrijheer of Zuid-Polsbroek, and his wife Aeltje Boelens Loen, member of the family Boelens Loen, one of the oldest patrician families of Amsterdam and great-great-granddaughter of the important late medieval Amsterdam city regent and burgomaster Andries Boelens. His father was of free-thinking, republican sentiment, but also known for his obsession with fame. He was one of the leading Remonstrants and state-loving patricians, who was nevertheless not a principled anti-Orangist (supporters if the House of Orange-Nassau). He honored the inheritance of his father, Dirck Jansz Graeff, who was on friendly terms with William the Silent of Orange. The young De Graeffs were influenced by their father's antagonistic attitude towards political issues.

The relationship between the leading patriciat was very close. Four of Cornelis ' siblings married members of the Bicker family. One of his sisters Agneta de Graeff van Polsbroek married Jan Bicker. The couple had Wendela Bicker and Jacoba Bicker among others; Wendela married to Grand pensionary Johan de Witt and Jacoba to his own son Pieter de Graeff. His close relatives included also Hollands writer and poet Pieter Corneliszoon Hooft as one of his uncles, the influential Amsterdam burgomasters and statesmen Andries, Cornelis, Jan Bicker who were his cousins, and burgomaster Frans Banning Cocq (captain of Rembrandt's painting The Night Watch), who was his brother-in-law. He was also linked to the noble family of Van Hogendorp by marriage and burgomaster Joan Huydecoper van Maarsseveen was his great cousin.

==== Historical and political Legacy ====
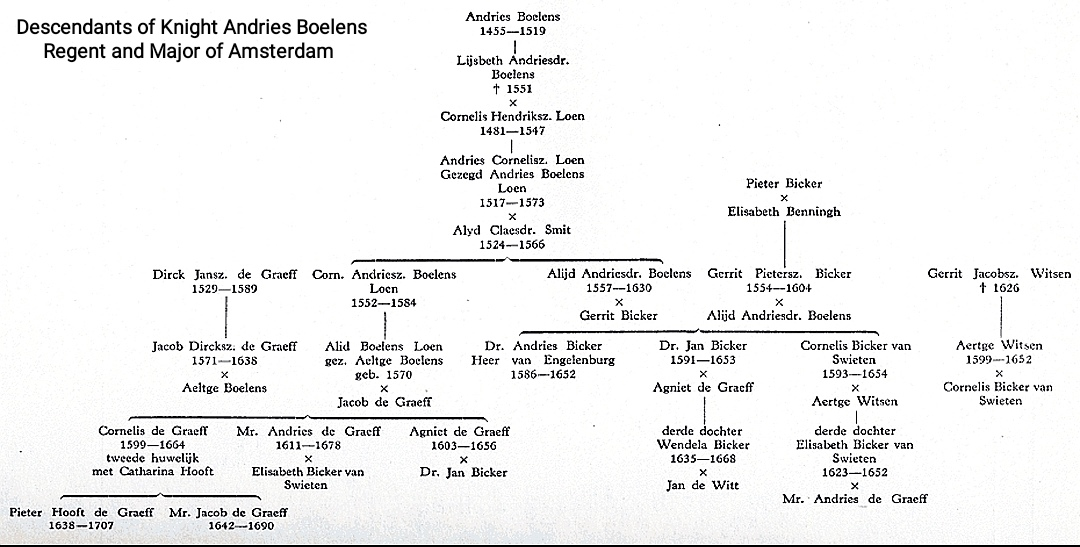
Overview of the personal family relationships of the Amsterdam oligarchy between the regent-dynasties Boelens Loen, De Graeff, Bicker (van Swieten), Witsen and Johan de Witt during the Dutch Golden Age

Cornelis de Graeff said that the ancient Amsterdammers had no habit of keeping genealogical records of their families, and knew no more of their generation than what they have learned from their fathers and grandfathers. The dates of his own family in Amsterdam do not go back very far:

And first I'll start with the family de Graven from which I descended on my father's side. This is a family from Amsterdam, coming from the house 'de Keijser', that was located at the Waeter (= now Damrak No. 91). This house shows the impression of its vaulted appearance, owned by Jan Pieters de Graeff, and then by Dirck Jans de Graeff, who also sold this house. My father Jacob de Graeff and his brothers were also born here.

The De Graeff family has therefore never boasted about the age of their own family in Amsterdam. But Cornelis and his brother Andries together with their cousins Andries and Cornelis Bicker, saw themselves as the political heirs of the old regent family Boelens, whose main lineage, which had remained catholic, had died out in the male line in 1647. They had received the very significant first names Andries and Cornelis from their Boelens ancestors. As in a real dynasty, members of the two families frequently intermarried in the 17th century in order to keep their political and commercial capital together. Its great historical ancestor was Andries Boelens (1455-1519), the city's most influential medieval mayor. Both families, Bicker and De Graeff, descend in the female line from Boelens. He was allowed to hold the highest office in Amsterdam fifteen times.

==== Coat of arms ====
Coat of arms

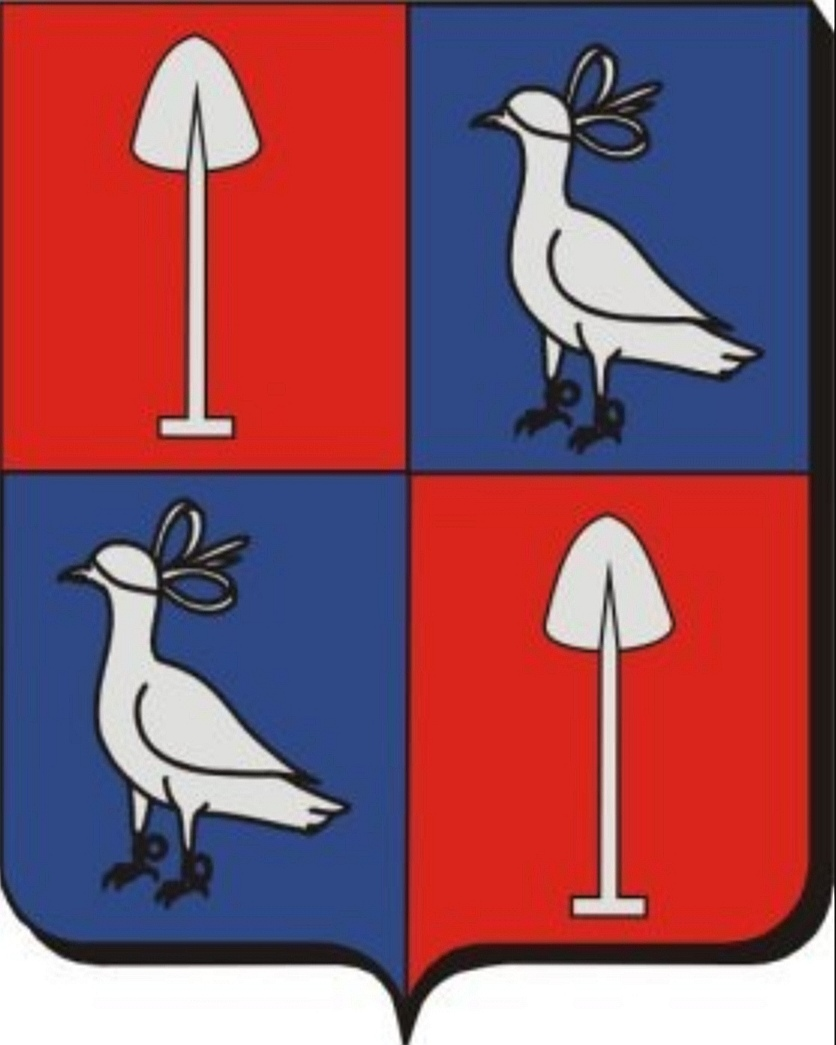
Ancient coat of arms

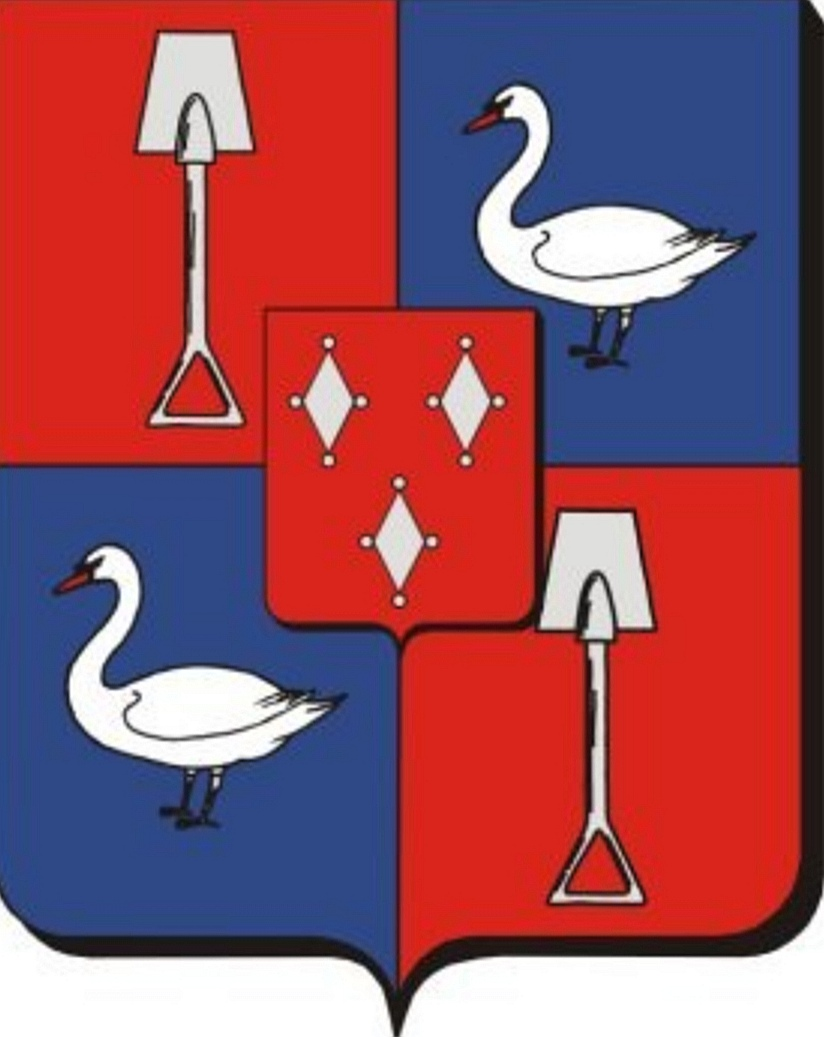
Personal coat of arms as Free Lord of Zuid-Polsbroek

Cornelis de Graeff's coat of arms of origin was quartered and showed the following symbols:

- field 1 (left above) the silver shovel on a red background of their paternal ancestors, the Herren von Graben
- field 2 (right above) it shows a silver falcon on a blue background. The origin of the falcon lies in the possession of the Valckeveen estate (later the Valckenburg estate) in Gooiland
- field 3 (left below), same as field 2
- field 4 (right below), same as field 1
- helmet covers in red and silver
- helm adornment shows an upright silver spade with ostrich feathers (Herren von Graben)
- motto: MORS SCEPTRA LIGONIBUS AEQUAT (DEATH MAKES SEPTRES AND HOES EQUAL)

The personal coat of arms of Cornelis de Graeff since 1638 is quarterd with a heart shield and shows the following symbols:

- heart shield shows the three silver rhombuses on red (originally from the family Van Woerdern van Vliet) of the High Lordship Zuid-Polsbroek
- field 1 (left above) shows the silver shovel on red of their paternal ancestors, the Herren von Graben
- field 2 (right above) shows the silver swan on blue of the Fief Vredenhof [or that one (Waterland) of their maternal ancestors, the De Grebber
- field 3 (left below), same as field 2
- field 4 (right below), same as field 1
- helmet covers in red and silver
- helm adornment shows an upright silver spade with ostrich feathers (Herren von Graben)
- motto: MORS SCEPTRA LIGONIBUS AEQUAT (DEATH MAKES SEPTRES AND HOES EQUAL)
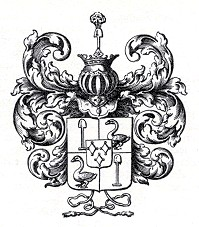
Full coat of arms

=== Marriage ===
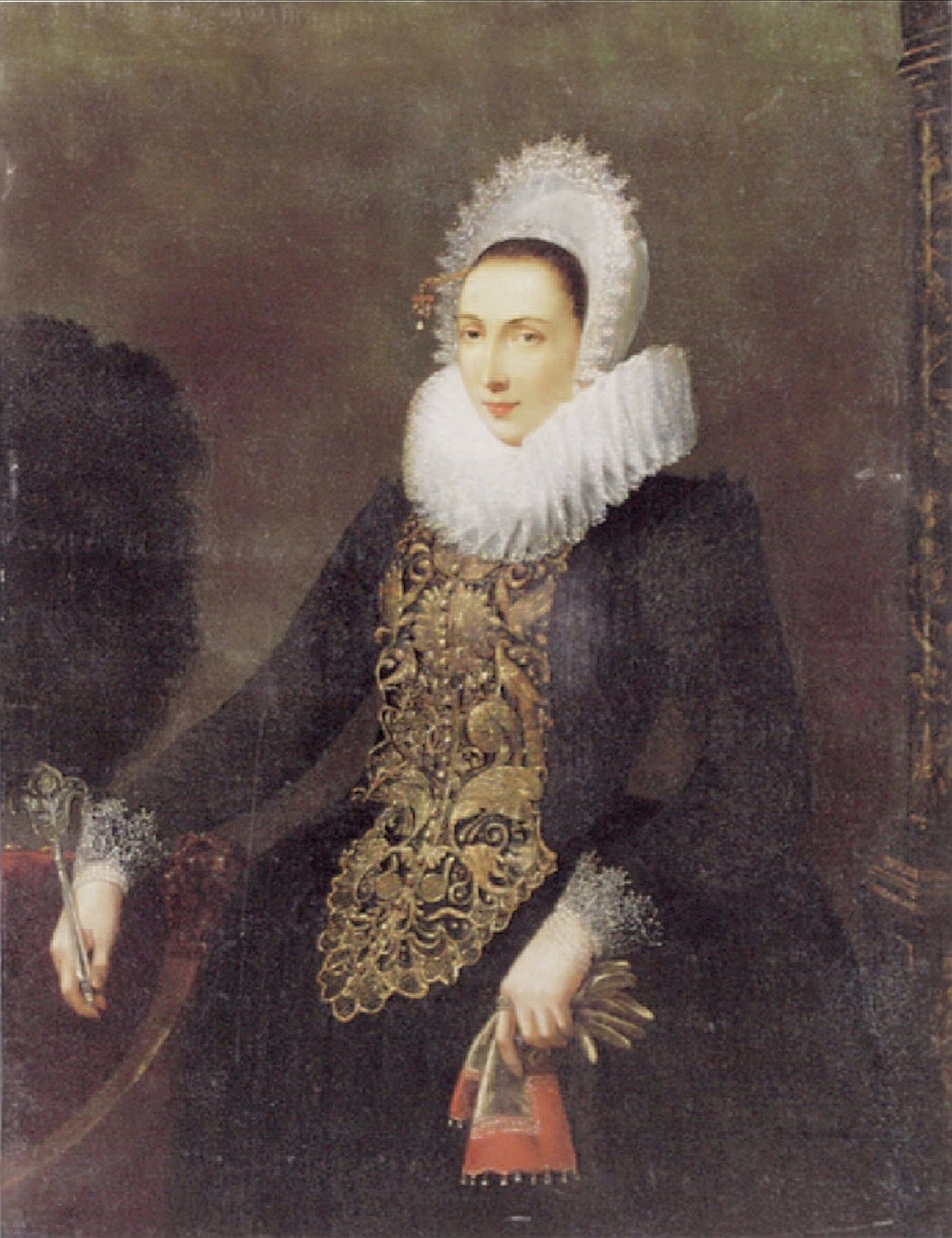
Geertruid Overlander van Purmerland (1609-1634), De Graeff's first wife who died at early age

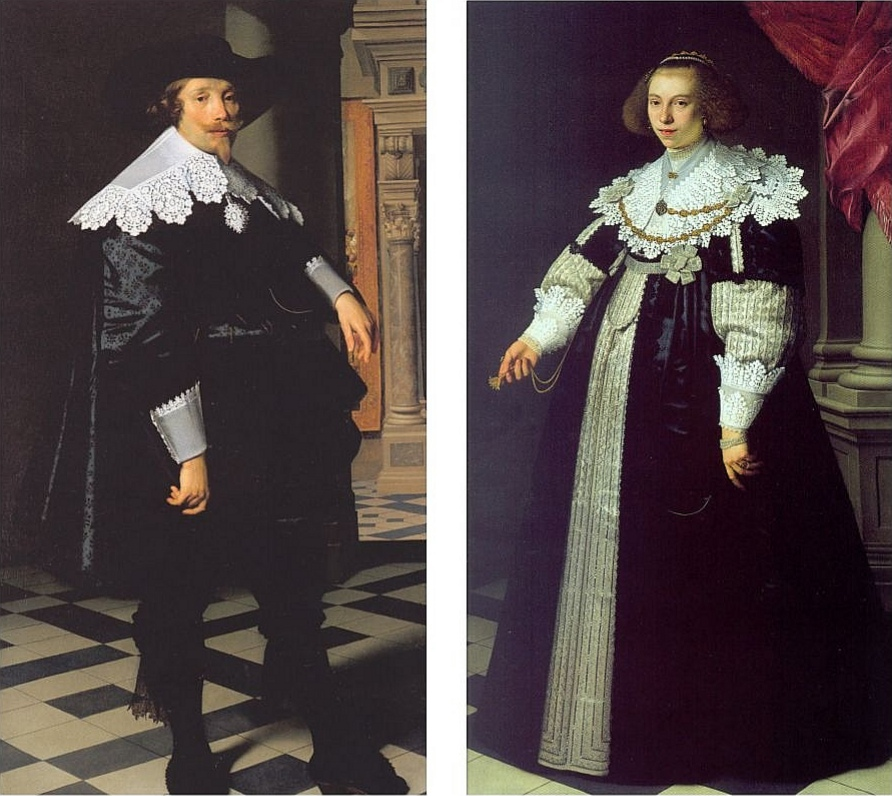
Wedding portrait of Cornelis de Graeff with his second wife Catharina Hooft (1618–1691), painted by Nicolaes Eliaszoon Pickenoy (1636), Gemäldegalerie Berlin

In 1633 Cornelis de Graeff married Geertruid Overlander van Purmerland (1609–1634), daughter of burgomaster Volkert Overlander and sister of Maria Overlander van Purmerland who was married to Frans Banning Cocq, the captain in Rembrandt's Night Watch. She died only a few months later and he remarried with Catharina Hooft, nineteen years younger and his first wife's cousin (daughter of her aunt . She was the daughter of Pieter Jansz Hooft and Geertruid Overlander (1577-1653), sister of Volkert. She was family with Amsterdam burgomaster Cornelis Pietersz. Hooft and the renowned poet and writer P. C. Hooft of the Muiderslot. The couple De Graeff-Hooft had two sons:

1. Pieter de Graeff (1638-1707), Vrijheer of Zuid-Polsbroek, Purmerland and Ilpendam, member of the government of Amsterdam, trusted councilor of his cousin and brother-in-law Johan de Witt and one of the leaders of the Dutch East India Company; married his cousin Jacoba Bicker
2. Jacob de Graeff (1642-1690), Vrijheer of Purmerland and Ilpendam, one of the players of the foundation stone of the Amsterdam city hall Op de Dam, Schepen of Amsterdam; married Maria van der Does

The married couple inhabited a fine building with precious woodwork, not far from the city hall, at what is now Herengracht 216.

== Life and Political work ==
=== Influence ===
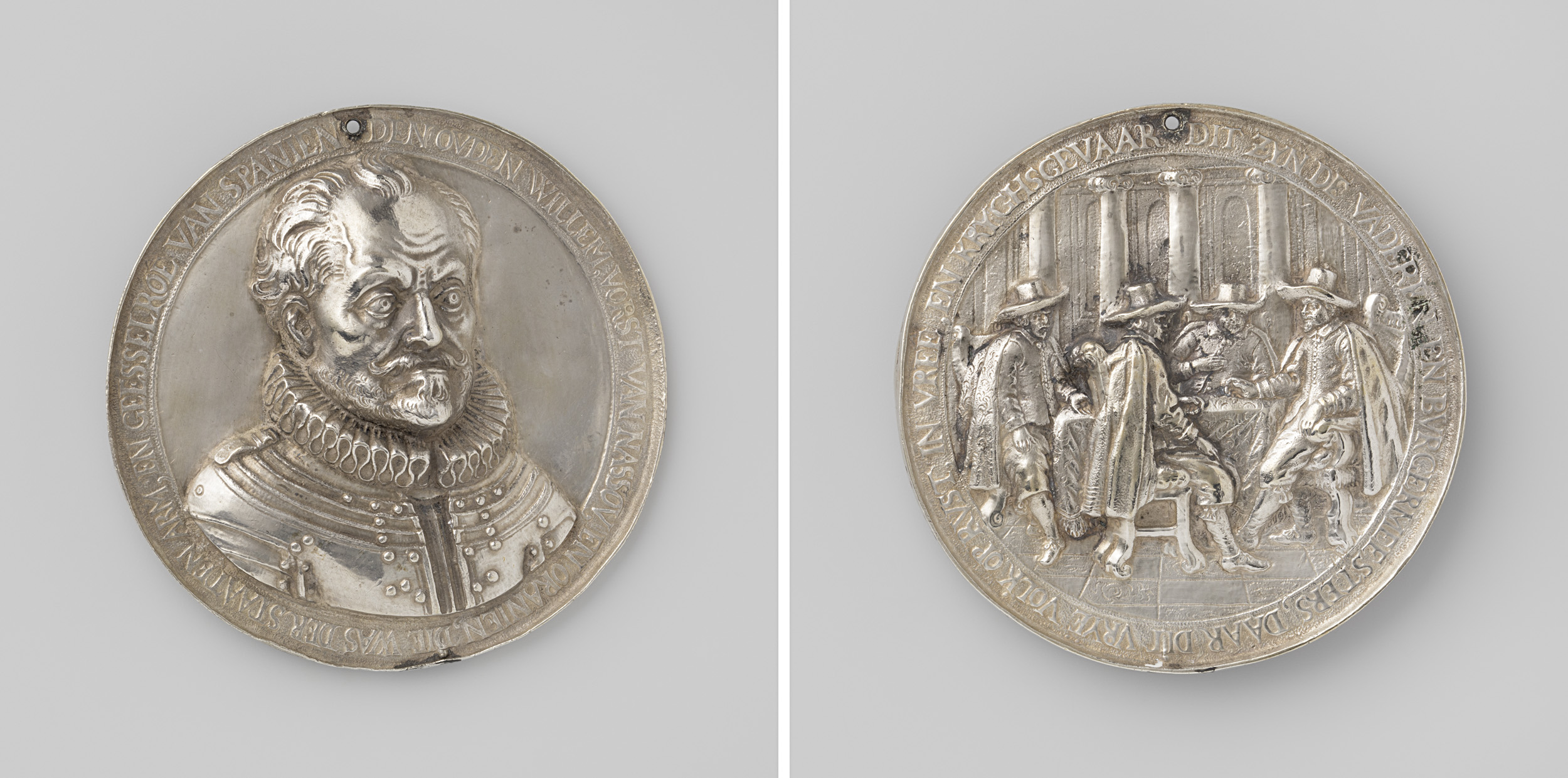
William I and the mayoral council of Amsterdam: William the Silent (prins van Oranje), Cornelis de Graeff, heer van Zuid-Polsbroek, Joan Huydecoper van Maarseveen (I), Jan van de Poll (1597-1678) and Hendrick Dircksz. Spiegel. (silver penning by Wouter Muller, 1655)

Both brothers Cornelis and Andries de Graeff were very critical of the Orange family’s influence. Together with the Republican political leader Grand Pensionary Johan de Witt, the De Graeff brothers strived for the abolition of stadtholdership. They desired the full sovereignty of the individual regions in a form in which the Republic of the United Seven Netherlands was not ruled by a single person. Instead of a sovereign (or stadtholder) the political and military power was lodged with the States General and with the regents of the cities in Holland.

During the two decades the De Graeff family had a leading role in the Amsterdam administration, the city was at the peak of its political power. This period was also referred to by Republicans as the ‘Ware Vrijheid’ (True Freedom). It was the First Stadtholderless Period which lasted from 1650 to 1672. During these twenty years, the regents from Holland and in particular those of Amsterdam, controlled the republic. The city was flush with self-confidence and liked to compare itself to the famous Republic of Rome. Even without a stadtholder, things seemed to be going well for the Republic and its regents both politically and economically.

=== Early years ===
Cornelis de Graeff grew up in the Niezel, a small street not far from the Oude Kerk. He was crippled for life in the left arm by a childhood accident, as can be seen in his painting. In 1626 he undertook together with his younger brother Dirk de Graeff and Willem Nooms, Lord van Aarlanderveen (he was the father of a illegitimate daughter named Margaretha, whom he, together with Dirk's sister Wendela de Graeff had) an extensive Cavaliersreise, which took them to Paris, Orléans, Blois, Nantes, La Rochelle, Poitiers and in 1628 brought it back to the capital. There they were warmly received by the then Swedish ambassador Hugo de Groot (Latinized Hugo Grotius). In the same year the three young men returned to their home town via Flanders.

=== Steps into politics ===
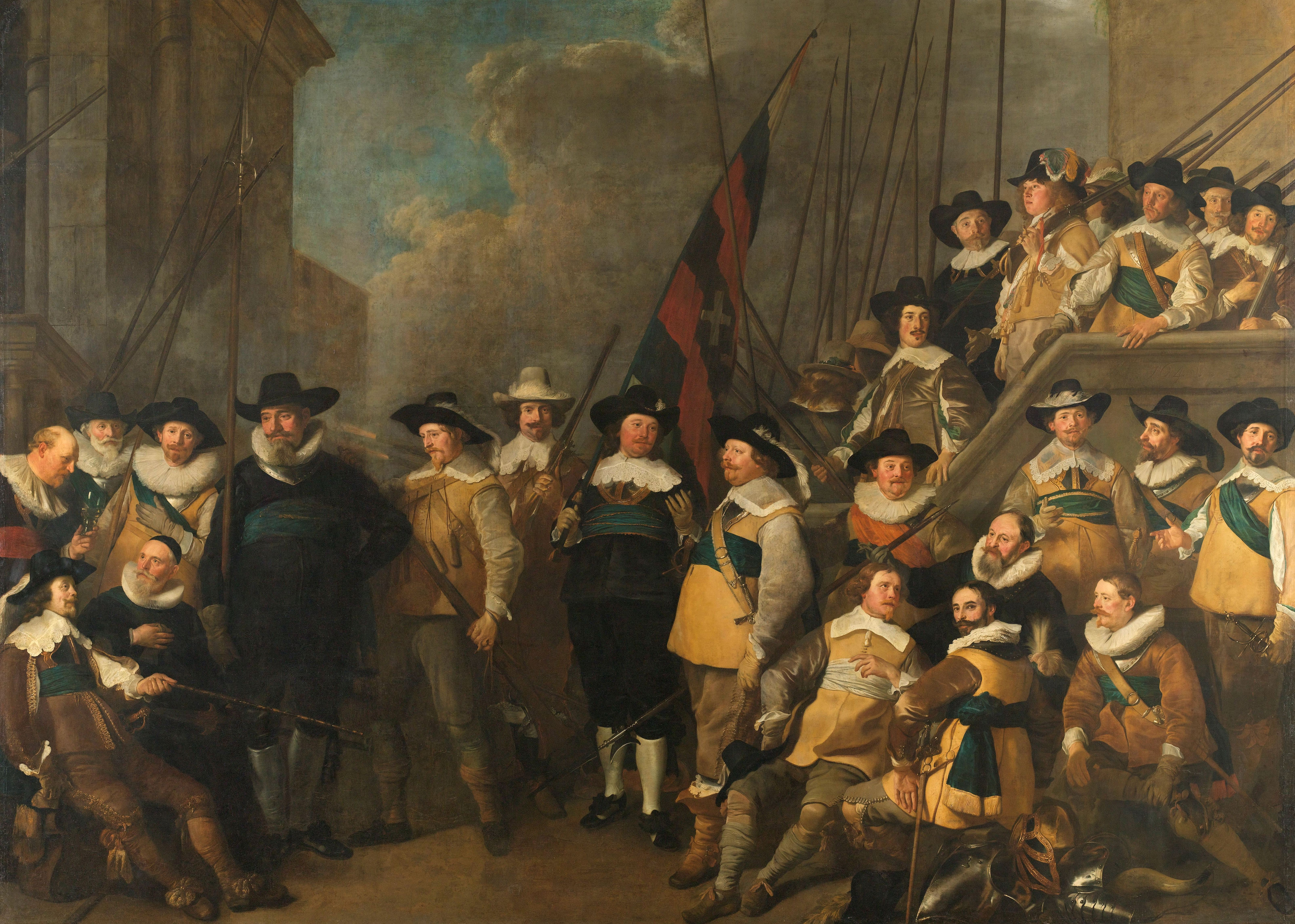
Cornelis de Graeff (left) as captain of the Amsterdam Citizens Guard (1642), painted by Jacob Adriaensz. Backer, Rijksmuseum Amsterdam

In 1636 De Graeff's career began as one of the leaders (Bewindhebber), and later as President, of the Dutch East India Company (VOC). In 1638 he took over his deceased father's seat in the Amsterdam Vroedschap and as his heir the High Lordship of Zuid-Polsbroek. The following year he became Schepen of Amsterdam and captain of the Amsterdam schutterij (Citizens' Guard) and it was his company that was painted in 1642 by Jacob Adriaenszoon Backer (to be seen in the Rijkmuseum Amsterdam). Within the city government, Cornelis de Graeff was in covert opposition to the Bickers, particularly his cousin burgomaster Andries Bicker. In 1643, Cornelis de Graeff was appointed Burgemeester (burgomaster or mayor) for the first time. In the same year he was also the silent force behind the decision to get rid of Andries Bicker, who had become overpowering in the Vroedschap, by appointing him to the Council of States of Holland. Between 1645 and 1647 he was Amsterdam's Gecommitteerde Raad of the States General in The Hague. Here, De Graeff enjoyed the intimate trust of stadtholder Frederik Hendrik of Orange, who asked him to lead the peace negotiations with Spain at his side.

=== Big politics ===
==== City hall Op de Dam ====
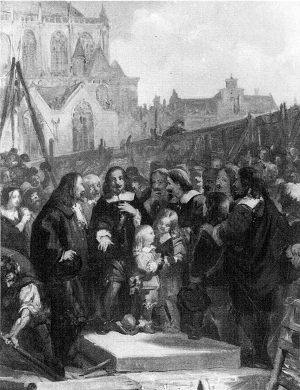
Jacob de Graeff laid the foundation stone for the new city hall on the Dam in 1648, painted by Barend Wijnveld Jr. (19th century)

In 1648, Cornelis de Graeff, together with his second cousin Joan Huydecoper van Maarsseveen, initiated the construction of the new stadhuis (the new city hall) on the Dam, today's Paleis op de Dam, that was inaugurated in 1655. In the Golden Age, rulership of the state was in the hands of regents and powerful merchants. Material wealth was considered God's grace and established the power of the estates. The model was the noble Republic of Venice, which is why they created their building based on the Venetian Doge's Palace, which was considered the republican center of the republic and the seat of the mayor, the regent. His son Jacob de Graeff laid the foundation stone together with Gerbrand Pancras, Sybrant Valckenier and Pieter Schaep. His silver shovel decorated with his coat of arms is still in the collections of Amsterdam's Rijksmuseum. Poet Joost van den Vondel wrote his poem Bouwzang for this occasion. Van den Vondel also dedicated a poem in praise of his mentor and initiator of the building, Cornelis de Graeff, to this event. The history of the origins and the year of this first laying of the stone was recorded in Latin script by De Graeff on a black marble slab in one of the courtrooms:

- On October 29, 1648, the year that ended the war that the united Low German peoples had waged on land and sea in almost all parts of the world for more than 80 years with the three powerful Philip, the kings of Spain, on land and at sea in almost all parts of the world for more than 80 years, after national freedom and freedom of belief were secured, during the government of the excellent mayors Gerb. Pancras, Jac. de Graef, Sib. Valchenier Pet. Schaep, the mayor's sons and blood relatives laid the foundation for this town hall by laying the foundation stone.

In between, Cornelis de Graeff bought the burial place in Amsterdam's Oude Kerk for himself and his descendants. In the center of the stained glass windows of the De Graeffs' baptistery are the coats of arms of Cornelis and his wife Catharina Hooft.

==== Peace of Münster and afterwards ====
In 1648 Cornelis de Graeff was one of the prime movers behind the Peace of Münster. In the failed attack on Amsterdam in 1650, he realised that Andries, Cornelis and the other Bickers had to leave the vroedschap. He firced the Act of Seclusion in 1654, in which William III was excluded from the office of Stadtholder. He reached the height of his power as chairing mayor of Amsterdam, together with Johan Huydecoper van Maarsseveen. Cornelis de Graeff was brilliant not only in living languages, but also in Greek, Hebrew, Syriac and Arabic. He never went to church, but only for political reasons. It was probably due to his influence that Nieuwe Kerk was built without a tower. He was the patron of Vondel and Jan Vos and commissioned eight paintings from Govert Flinck for the city hall.

==== De Graeff and Johan de Witt: The true Freedom ====
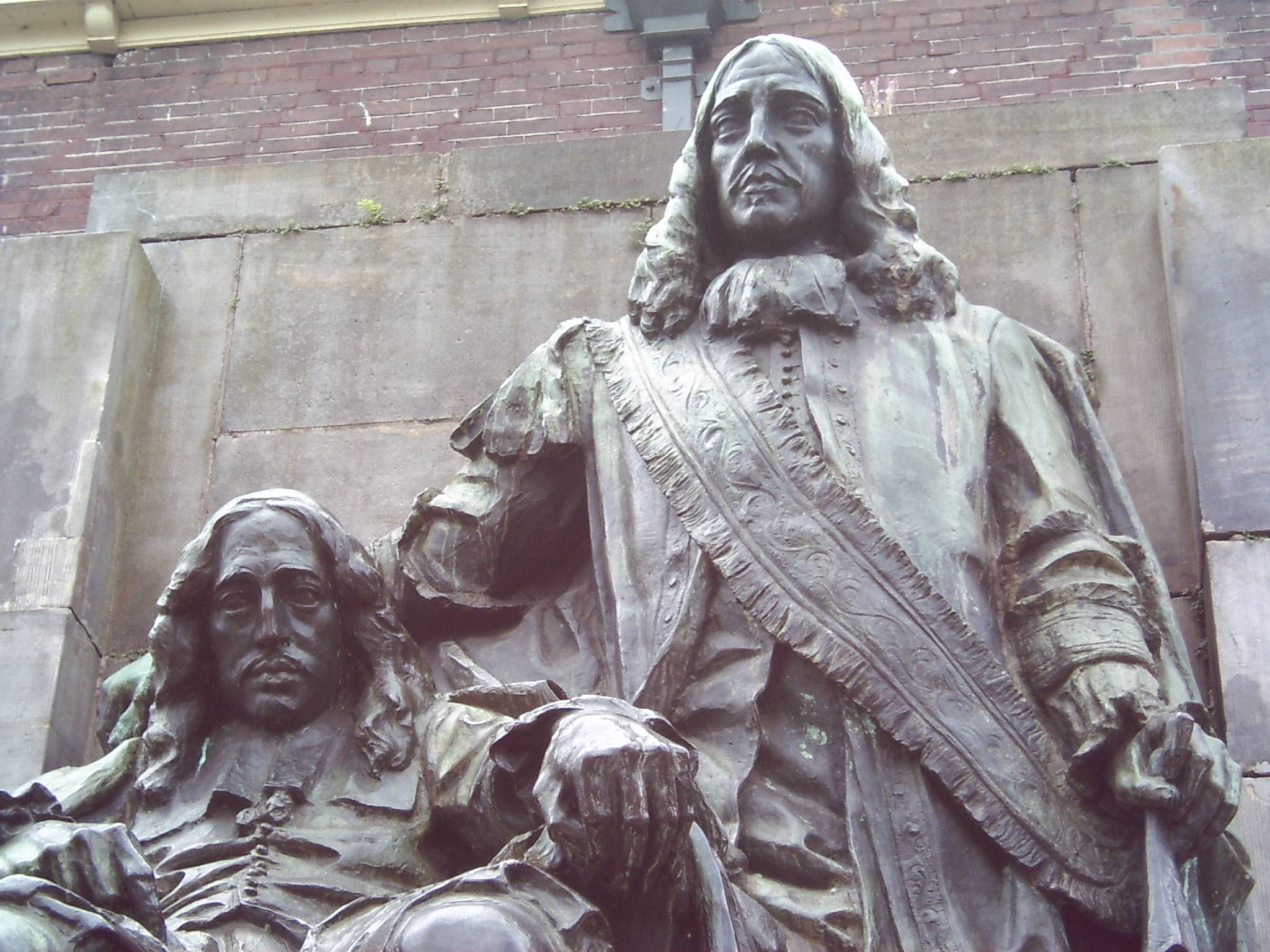
Statue of De Graeffs nephews Johan and Cornelis de Witt in Dordrecht

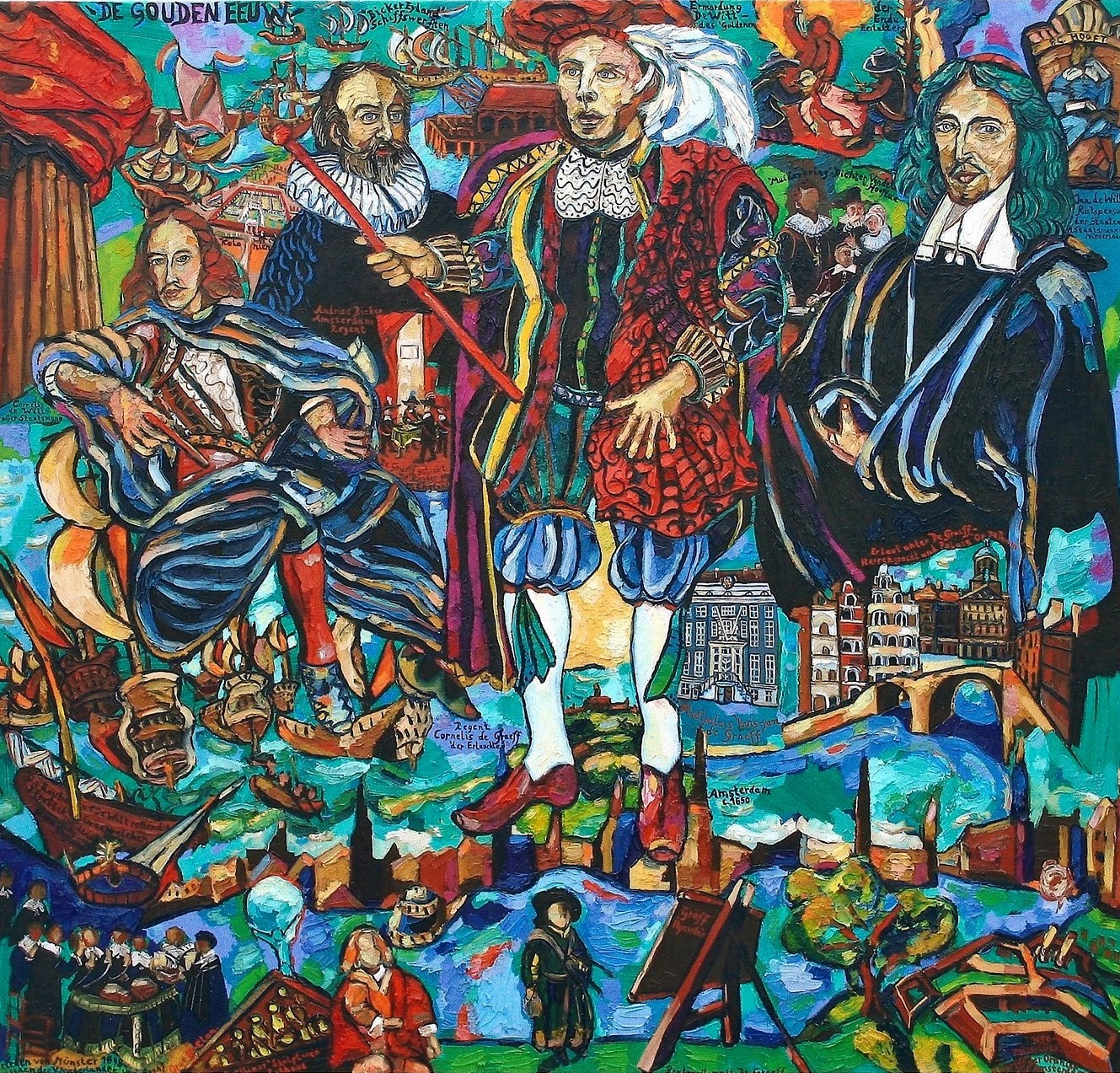
Historical-allegorical painting "De Gouden eeuw" about the De Graeff family of the Dutch Golden Age. The painting shows the protagonists around the Amsterdam regent Cornelis de Graeff (middle) and his relatives Johan de Witt (right), Cornelis de Witt (left) and Andries Bicker (second from left) as well as some events from this decade. (Painting by Matthias Laurenz Gräff, 2007)

Politically important as well as personally satisfying was De Graeff's ties with his niece Wendela Bicker's husband Johan de Witt. De Witt eagerly sought De Graeff's advice and support and also enjoyed his clearness of mind and warm hospitality. Their relationship combined the closeness of family affection and the mutual respect of two strong minds as De Graeff was De Witt's equal as no one else was in Dutch politics at the time. In 1653 De Graeff made Johan de Witt a 'Grand Pensionary', a sort of chairman, of the States of Holland.

==== War between Sweden and Poland ====
Amsterdam and De Graeff were at the high point of their power and in 1656 mounted an expedition under Michiel de Ruyter to the Mediterranean Sea and - in Charles X Gustav of Sweden's war against Poland - another under Jacob van Wassenaer Obdam to the Baltic Sea. Fortunately for the Netherlands, this war ended in Danzig being declared neutral. The four strong-headed mayors decided to send Coenraad van Beuningen to Copenhagen to incite Denmark into a war against Sweden. To everyone's amazement, in the middle of the winter the Swedish king crossed over from Jutland, across the Great Belt, to Copenhagen. In a second expedition to relieve Copenhagen, Witte de With participated in the Battle of the Sound. Cornelis de Graeff was prepared to begin the fight against Sweden, against the advice of the Grand Pensionarys. When Charles X unexpectedly died in 1660, Sweden made peace. Amsterdam sent also admiral Michiel de Ruyter against the English, against the orders of the parliament of the Netherlands. Despite these differences in approach with De Witt, he and De Graeff stayed on good terms. De Witt in 1660 observed of Cornelis: "with the gentleman of Zuidpolsbroek, in nothing was to do something".

==== William III of Orange ====
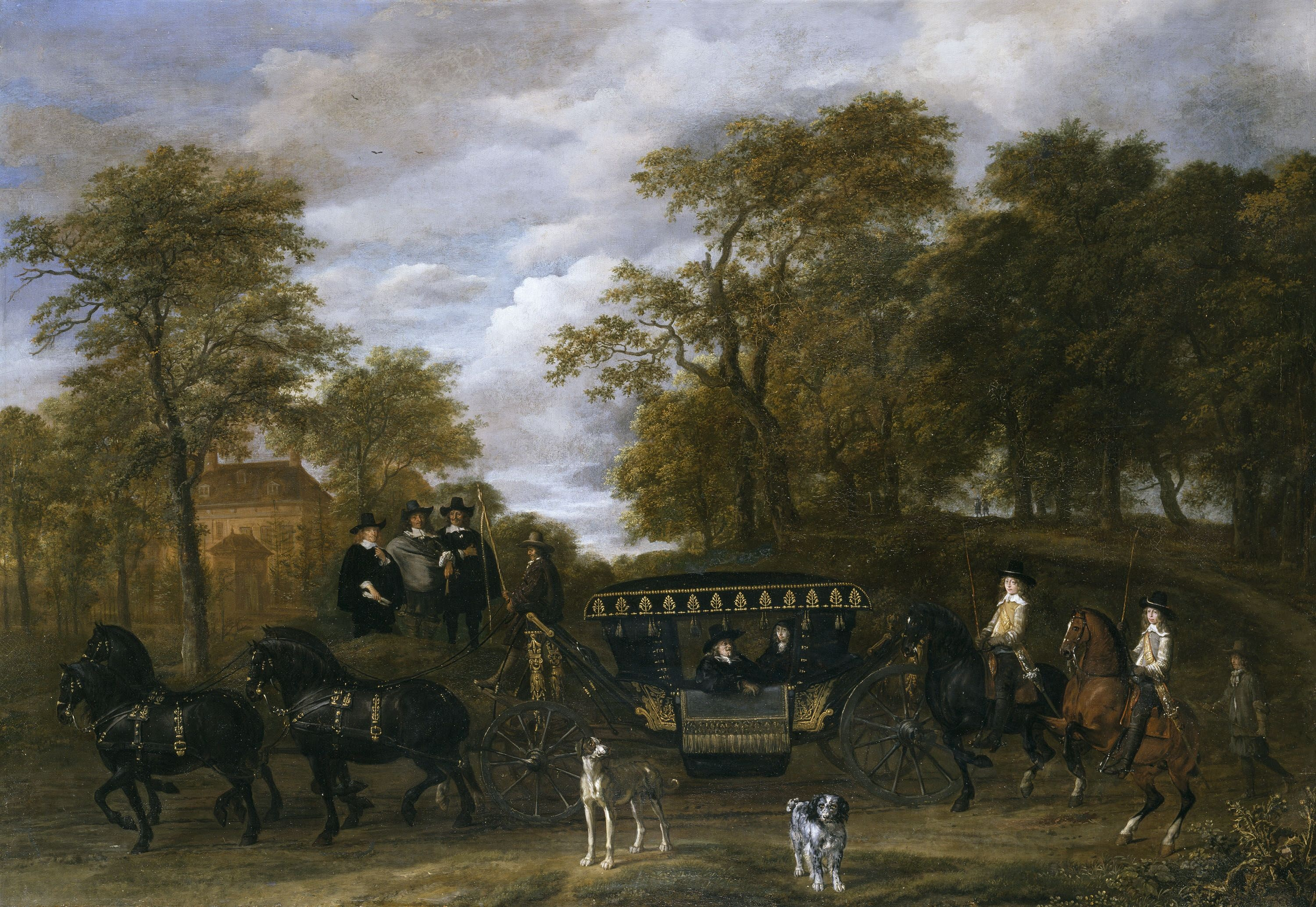
Cornelis de Graeff at Soestdijk, painted by Thomas de Keyser and Jacob van Ruisdael (1656-1660).

In 1657, De Graeff and De Witt mediated the "Treaty of Raalte", in which William III of Orange passed the stadholdership of Overijssel.

On 25 September 1660 the States of Holland under the prime movers of De Witt, De Graeff, his younger brother Andries de Graeff and Gillis Valckenier resolved to take charge of Willem III of Oranges education to ensure he would acquire the skills to serve in a future—though undetermined—state function. During the summers the family spent a lot of their time at the Palace Soestdijk, and the sons of De Graeff played with the young William - who became later King of England, Scotland and Ireland and stadtholder of the United Provinces of the Netherlands - at the lake and woods at Palace Soestdijk. After the rampjaar his son Jacob sold it to stadholder William III.

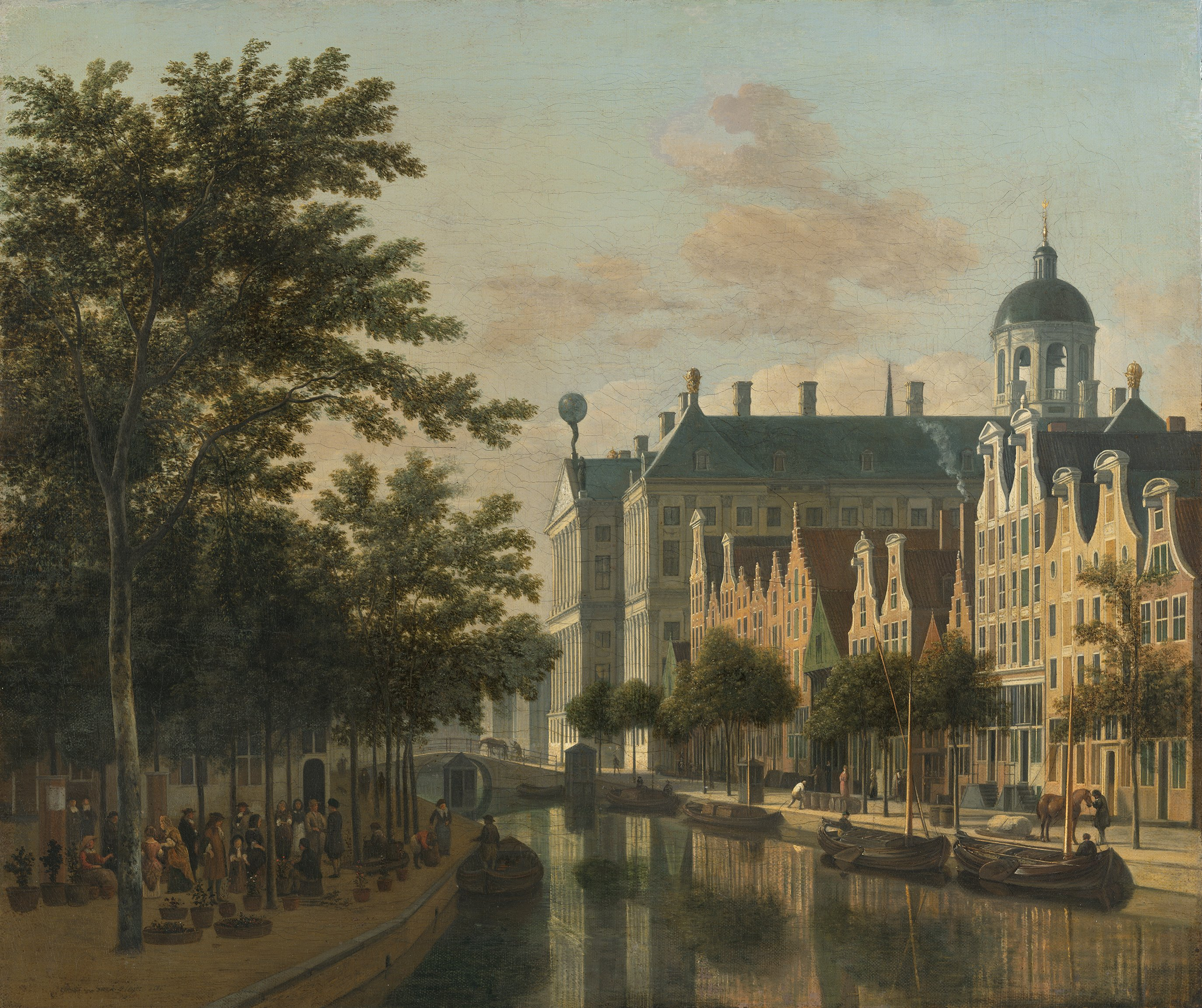
The rear of the townhall by Gerrit Berckheyde.

==== The Dutch Gift ====
In 1660 the Dutch Gift was organized by the regents, especially the powerful brothers Cornelis and Andries de Graeff. The sculptures for the gift were selected by the pre-eminent sculptor in the Netherlands, Artus Quellinus, and Gerrit van Uylenburgh, the son of Rembrandt's dealer Hendrick van Uylenburgh, advised the States-General on the purchase. The Dutch Gift was a collection of 28 mostly Italian Renaissance paintings and 12 classical sculptures, along with a yacht, the Mary, and furniture, which was presented to King Charles II of England by the States-General of the Netherlands in 1660.

Most of the paintings and all the Roman sculptures were from the Reynst collection, the most important seventeenth-century Dutch collection of paintings of the Italian sixteenth century, formed in Venice by Jan Reynst (1601–1646) and extended by his brother, Gerrit Reynst (1599–1658). The gift reflected the taste Charles II shared with his father, Charles I, whose large collection, one of the most magnificent in Europe, had mostly been sold abroad after he was executed in 1649. The collection was given to him to mark his return to power in the English Restoration, before which Charles had spent many years in exile in the Dutch Republic during the rule of the English Commonwealth. It was intended to strengthen diplomatic relations between England and the Republic, but only a few years after the gift the two nations would be at war again in the Second Anglo-Dutch War of 1665–1667.

== Death ==
Cornelis's tomb chapel is to be found of in the Oude Kerk, and after his death his younger brother Andries and the cunning Gillis Valckenier took over his role on the council. After De Graeff's death Johan de Witt lost his power and reputation in Amsterdam and afterwards in the Province Holland.

== Obituary and legacy ==
=== Historiography ===
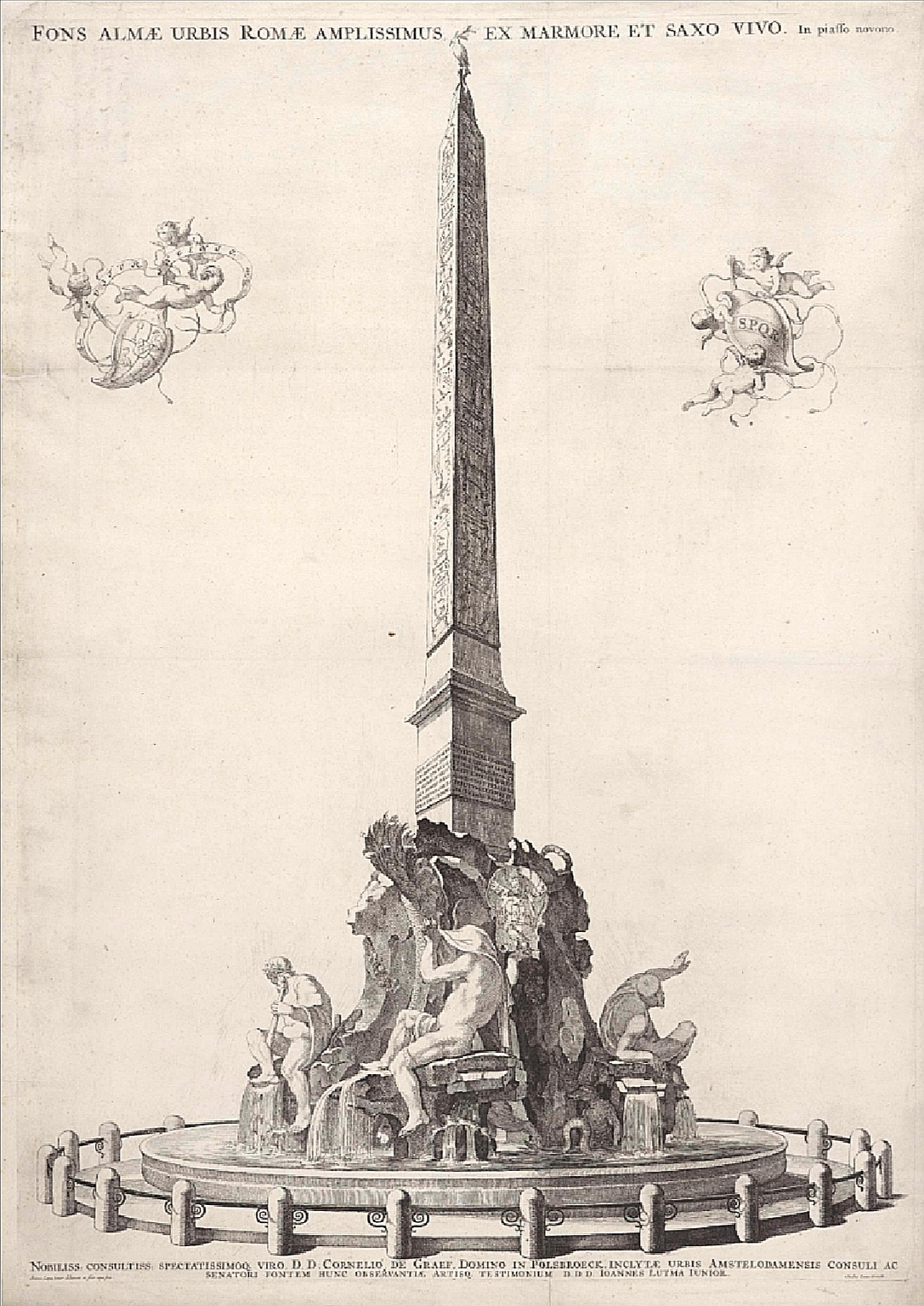
Allegory of Amsterdam and Cornelis de Graeff (Johannes Lutma)

De Graeff communication style was honest and open. He felt that it was De Witt who had brought Amsterdam and its interests to their present good fortune. De Graeff avoided policies that would jeopardize Amsterdam's position. He focused interests of the other towns of Holland and avoided isolating Amsterdam.

The Dutch art historian and archivist Bas Dudok van Heel about the impact of the Bicker [in particularly the brothers Andries and Cornelis Bicker] and the linked De Graeff family [in particularly the brothers Cornelis and Andries de Graeff] and their missed (high) noble rank: In Florence families like Bicker and De Graeff would have been uncrowned princes. Here, in 1815, they should at least have been raised to the rank of count, but the southern Dutch nobility would not have put up with that. What you got here remained nothing half and nothing whole.

=== Aims ===
Hajo Brugmans states that De Graeff's aims were nearly always administrative and political - the power of Amsterdam in Holland, and the power of the Republic, was only as great as their social power, including the limitation of the power of the House of Orange. One point, however, is emphasised by Brugmans - that only De Graeff (out of all Amsterdam's politicians) was ever elected grand pensionary and then entirely successful in pleasing Amsterdam. The regent's descendant Adriaen Pauw was also elected as such in 1651.

== Literature ==
- Israel, Jonathan I. (1995) The Dutch Republic - Its Rise, Greatness, and Fall - 1477-1806, Clarendon Press, Oxford, ISBN 978-0-19-820734-4
- Rowen, Herbert H. (1986) John de Witt - Statesman of the „True Freedom“, Cambridge University Press, ISBN 0-521-52708-2
- Kernkamp, G.W. (1977) Prins Willem II 1626-1650, p. 107-110.
- Dudok van Heel, S.A.C.(1995) Op zoek naar Romulus & Remus. Een zeventiende-eeuws onderzoek naar de oudste magistraten van Amsterdam. Jaarboek Amstelodamum, p. 43-70.
- Zandvliet, Kees De 250 rijksten van de Gouden Eeuw - Kapitaal, macht, familie en levensstijl (2006 Amsterdam; Nieuw Amsterdam Uitgevers)
- Burke, P. (1994) Venice and Amsterdam. A study of seventeenth-century élites.
- Brugmans, Hajo (1973) Geschiedenis van Amsterdam - Deel 3 Bloeitijd, 1621–1697, p. 159 t/m 167, (Het Spectrum, Utrecht) ISBN 90-274-8193-8
- Graeff, P. de (P. de Graeff Gerritsz en Dirk de Graeff van Polsbroek) Genealogie van de familie De Graeff van Polsbroek, Amsterdam 1882.
- Bruijn, J. H. de Genealogie van het geslacht De Graeff van Polsbroek 1529/1827, met bijlagen. De Built 1962-63.
- Moelker, H.P. De heerlijkheid Purmerland en Ilpendam (1978 Purmerend)

== External links and Commons ==
- Biografie from Cornelis de Graeff at the Nieuw Nederlandsch biografisch woordenboek. Deel 2 (nl)
- Biografie from Cornelis de Graeff at the Nieuw Nederlandsch biografisch woordenboek. Deel 7 (nl)
- Triumpf of Peace
- Portrait of Cornelis de Graeff by Nicolaes Eliasz. Pickenoy in the Gemäldegalerie, Berlin
- Medaillons of Cornelis de Graeff, his wife and his brother Andries in the Rijksmuseum
- Poem on him by Vondel
- History of Herengracht 573, now the Handbagmuseum

Cornelis de Graeff House De Graeff Born: 15 October 1599 Died: 4 May 1664
| Preceded by Jacob Dircksz de Graeff | Free Lord of Zuid-Polsbroek; 1638–1664 | Succeeded by Pieter de Graeff |
| Preceded by Jacob Dircksz de Graeff and Andries Bicker | Lord of the manor of Sloten, Sloterdijk, Nieuwer-Amstel, Osdorp and Amstelveen; 1638–1664 | Succeeded by Simon van Hoorn and City of Amsterdam |
