= William II of Orange =

Prince of Orange from 1647 to 1650

William II
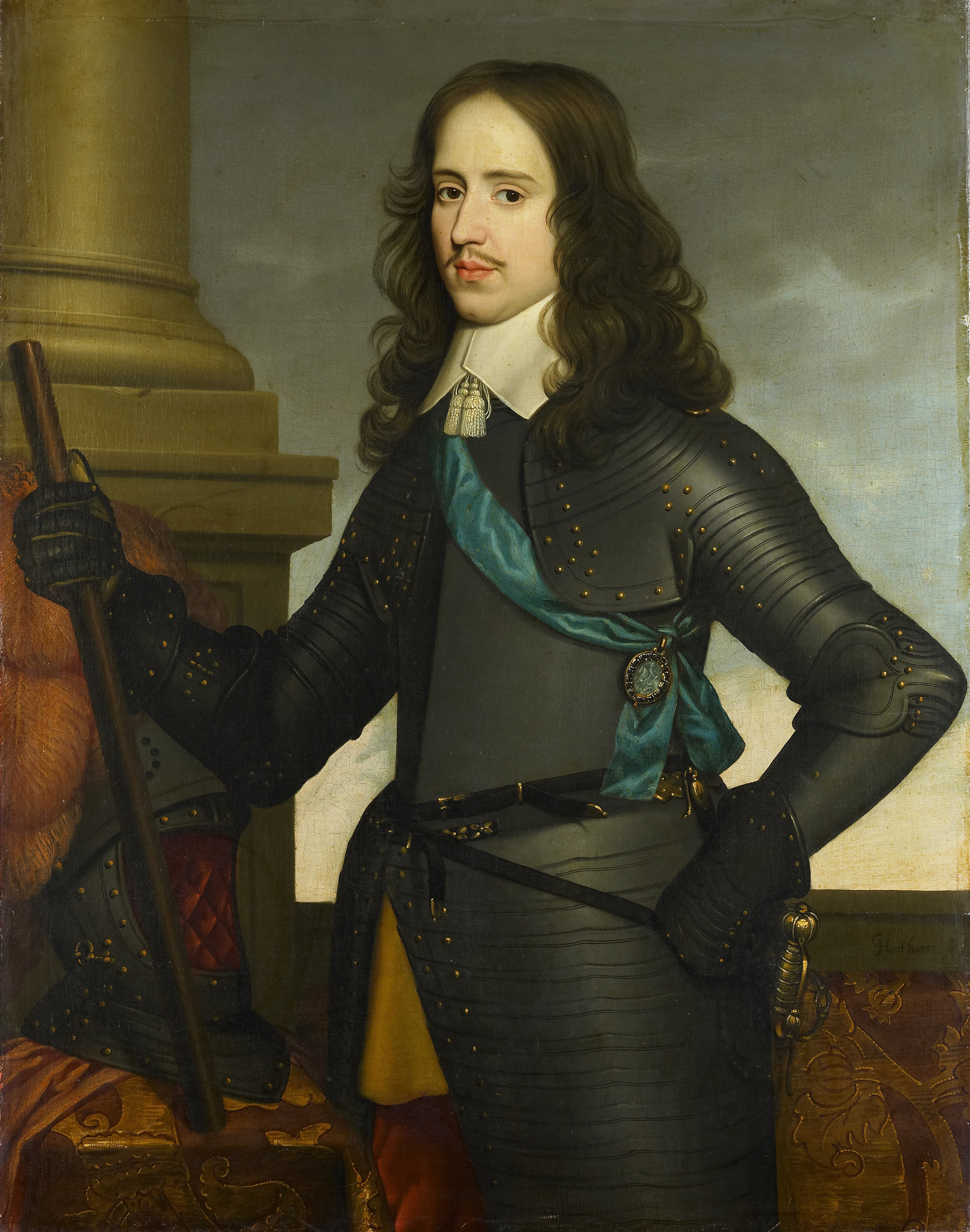

Prince of Orange
- Reign: 14 March 1647 – 6 November 1650
- Predecessor: Frederick Henry
- Successor: William III

Stadtholder of Holland, Zeeland, Utrecht, Guelders, and Overijssel
- Reign: 14 March 1647 – 6 November 1650
- Predecessor: Frederick Henry
- Successor: First Stadtholderless Period

Stadtholder of Groningen
- Reign: 14 March 1647 – 6 November 1650
- Predecessor: Frederick Henry
- Successor: William Frederick
- Born: 27 May 1626; The Hague, Dutch Republic
- Died: 6 November 1650 (aged 24); The Hague, Dutch Republic
- Burial: 8 March 1651; Nieuwe Kerk, Delft
- Spouse: Mary Stuart (m. 1641)
- Issue: William III
- House: Orange-Nassau
- Father: Frederick Henry of Orange
- Mother: Amalia of Solms-Braunfels
- Religion: Calvinism

William II (Dutch: Willem II; 27 May 1626 – 6 November 1650) was sovereign Prince of Orange and Stadtholder of Holland, Zeeland, Utrecht, Guelders, Overijssel and Groningen in the United Provinces of the Netherlands from 14 March 1647 until his death three years later on 6 November 1650. His death marked the beginning of the First Stadtholderless Period, leading to the rise of Johan De Witt, who stayed in power for the next 22 years.

His only child, William III, reigned as King of England, Scotland, and Ireland in 1689, following the Glorious Revolution. His son William also became Stadtholder of the Five Dutch Provinces in 1672, marking the end of the formentioned Stadtholderless Period.

== Early life and childhood (1626-1640) ==
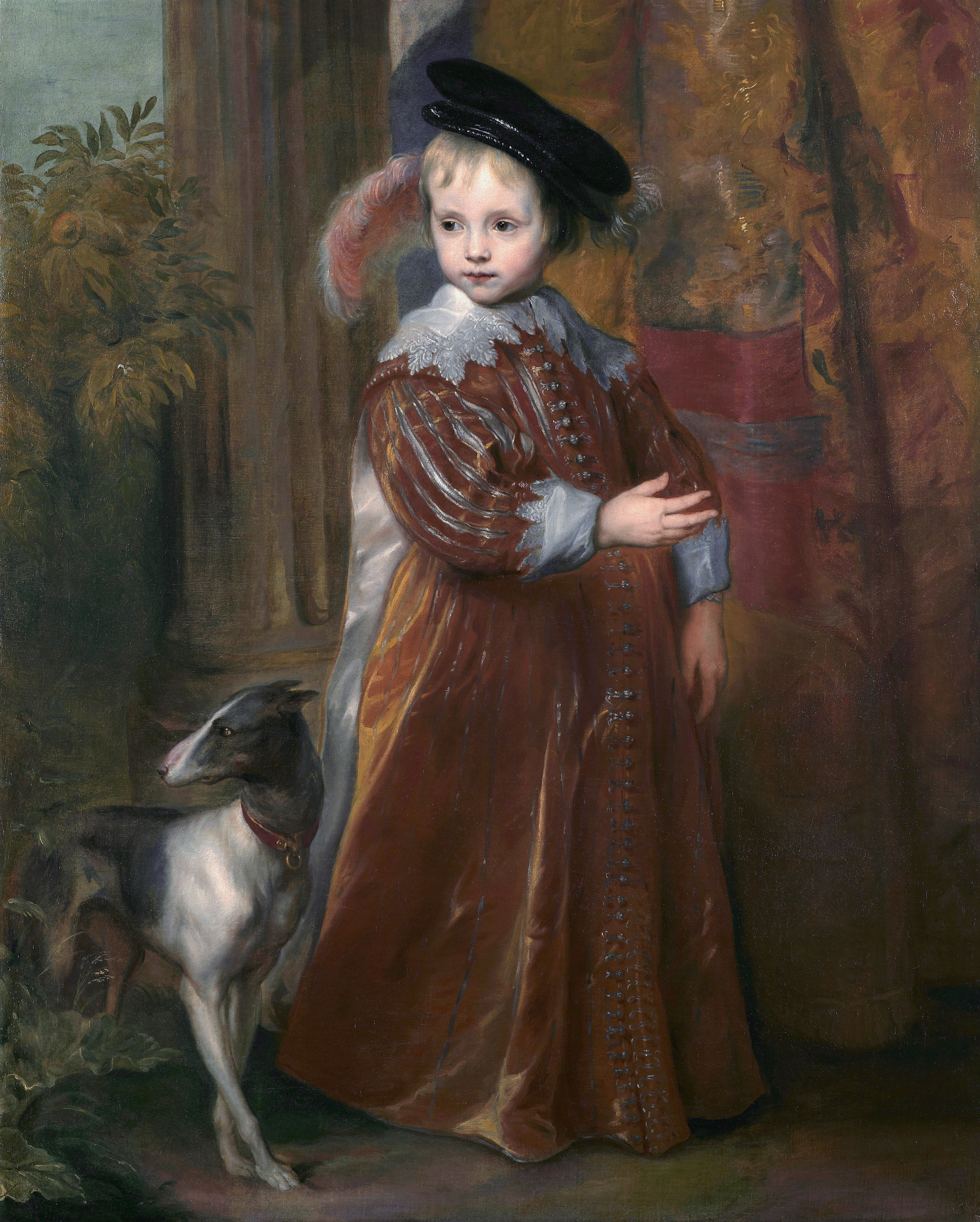
William II as a young boy, c. 1632

William II (or Willem II), Prince of Orange, was born on 27 May 1626, as the first legitimate child and elder son of Frederick Henry, Prince of Orange, and his wife Amalia of Solms-Braunfels. Frederick Henry was the youngest son of William the Silent (stadtholder 1559–1584); his older half brother Maurits of Nassau was Stadtholder (1585–1625); Frederick Henry was stadtholder from 1625 to 1647. Frederick Henry also had another half-brother, Philip William, who reigned as Prince of Orange (1584−1618). William had eight liveborn siblings, but his surviving siblings were Luise Henriette (1627−1667), Albertine Agnes (1634−1696), Henriette Catherine (1637−1708) and Maria (1642−1688). All of his surviving sisters married into German nobility. The stadtholders governed in conjunction with the States-General, an assembly of representatives from each of the seven provinces, but usually dominated by the largest and wealthiest province, Holland.

== Marriage ==
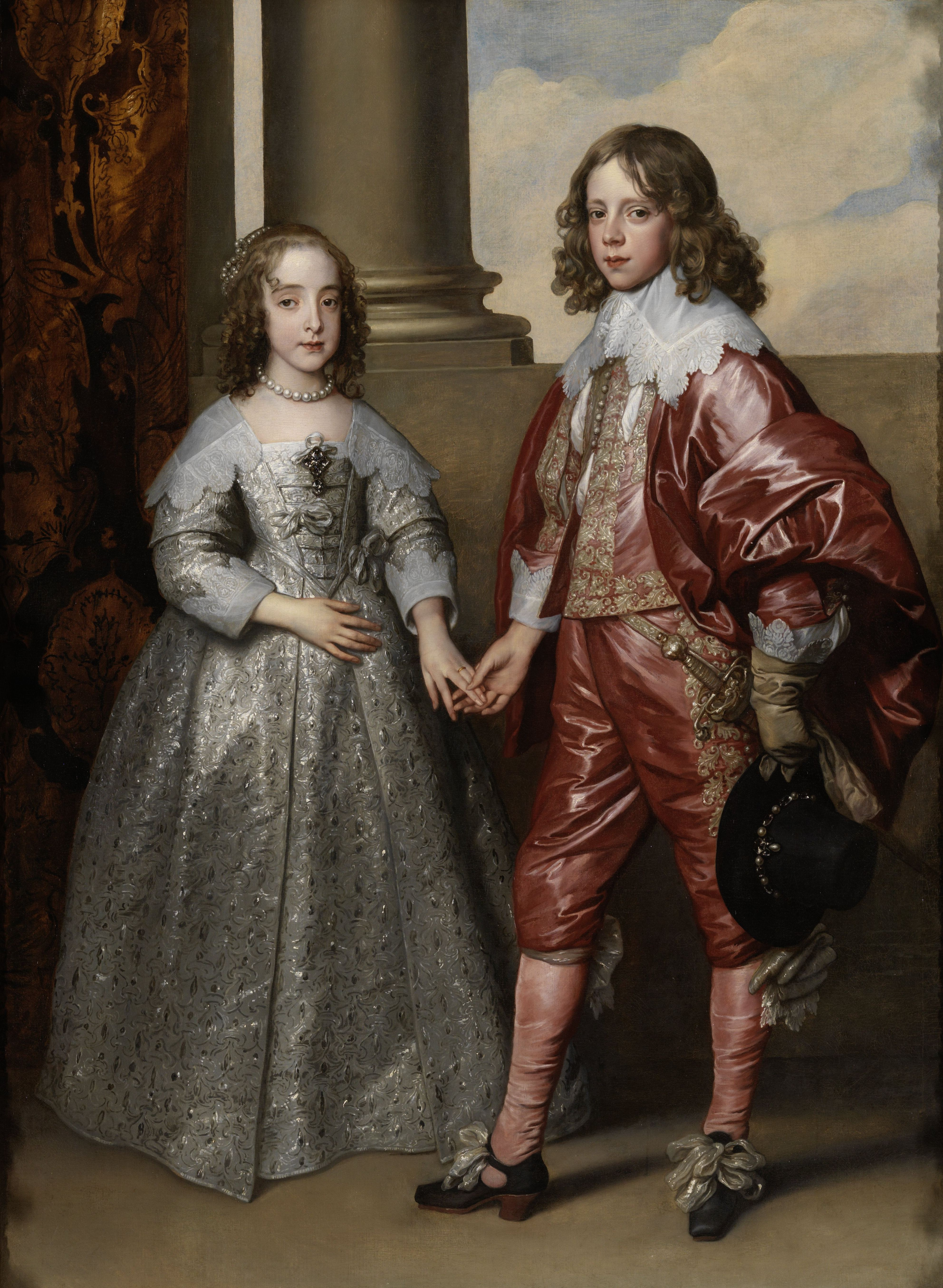
Betrothed William and Mary by Anthony van Dyck, c. 1641

In January 1640, William of Orange proposed to Mary, Princess Royal, the eldest daughter of King Charles I of England. The princess was only 8 years old at the time. The offer of the House of Orange was at first rejected by King Charles I, who wanted to give his daughter in marriage to Balthasar Charles, Prince of Asturias, only son and heir of King Philip IV of Spain. A prerequisite for such a union was Mary's conversion to Catholicism, but the princess, who at the request of her mother studied the basics of the Catholic religion, did not want to change her faith. As a result, Mary declined this proposal.

In late 1640–early 1641, King Charles I decided to renew negotiations with Prince Frederick Henry of Orange. On 10 February 1641, Charles announced to Parliament that the betrothal of his daughter was actually concluded and that it only remained to consider this union from a political point of view. Charles himself hoped that in case of emergency, the Prince of Orange would help him to maintain royal power in England.

A modest wedding ceremony took place on 2 May 1641 at the Chapel Royal in Whitehall Palace, London. William was not yet fifteen, while Mary was just nine at that time. (Note: In 1646, when William was twenty, and Mary only fifteen, William had what was described as a "dalliance" with Jeanne de Bommert Silvercroon, the daughter of a Swedish diplomat, and this had resulted in the illegitimate birth of a son, who would later become known as Abel Tassin d'Alonne.) Mary and William were congratulated by courtiers, and received several gifts; in addition, in honour of the couple, a volley of 120 guns was fired. Almost as soon as the ceremony ended, William returned to the Netherlands. In November 1643, the second marriage ceremony between the 17-year-old William and 12-year-old Mary took place in The Hague. The marriage was not consummated until 1644. In February 1644, Mary completely merged into the life of her husband's court.

== Reign and later life (1647-1650) ==
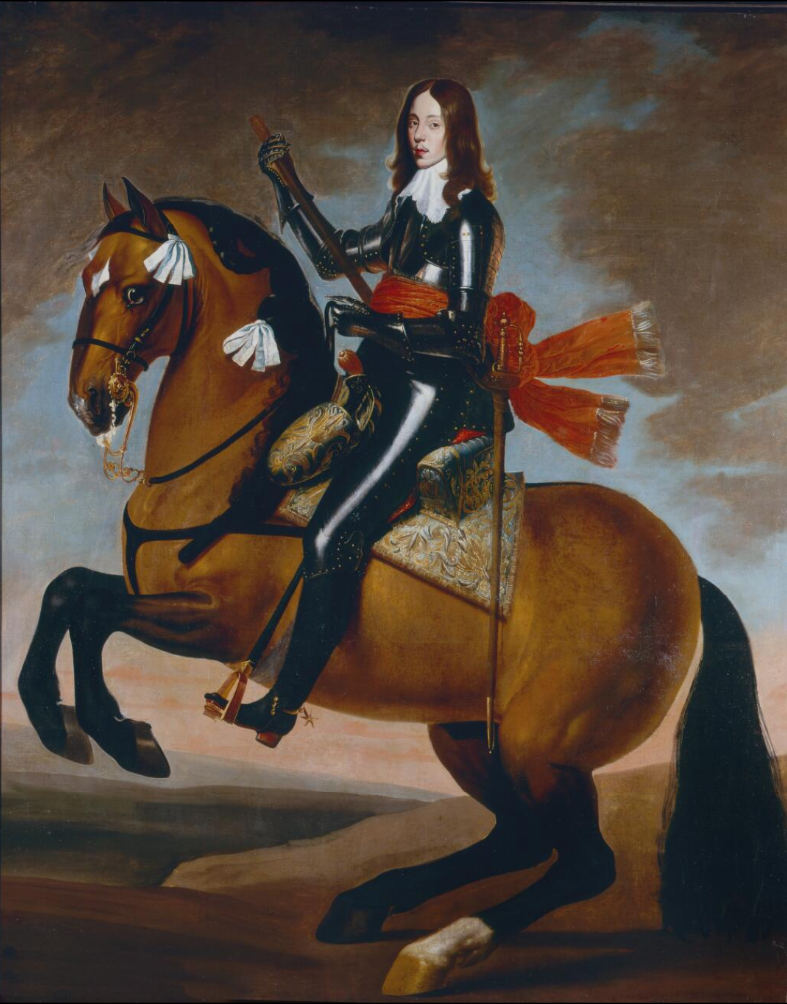
Portrait of William II on horseback by Anselm van Hulle, c. 1645–47

In 1647, his father, Frederick Henry died on 14 March, after a long illness (he suffered from gout and possibly some kind of Alzheimer's in the last few years of his life), and William II succeeded to both his hereditary titles and his elective offices as stadtholder of six of the seven provinces: Holland, Zeeland, Utrecht, Guelders, Overijssel and Groningen at the young age of 21. Soon after he became stadtholder, his wife Mary suffered a miscarriage, after which she couldn't conceive for a few years.

The Netherlands at this time was engaged in the Eighty Years' War against Spain for its independence. Under Frederick Henry, the Netherlands had largely won the war, and since 1646 had been negotiating with Spain on the terms for ending it.

The negotiators agreed to the Peace of Münster in 1648, but William opposed acceptance of the treaty, even though it recognized the independence of the (northern) Netherlands, because it left the southern Netherlands in the hands of the Spanish monarchy. A separate peace furthermore violated the alliance with France formed in 1635. However, the States of six provinces voted to accept it.

Secretly, William opened his own negotiations with France with the goal of extending his own territory under a more centralized government. In addition, he worked for the restoration of his exiled brother-in-law, Charles II, to the throne of England, William's father-in-law Charles I had been executed months earlier.

In 1650 William II became involved in a bitter quarrel with the province of Holland and the powerful Regents of Amsterdam, Cornelis and Andries Bicker, leaders of the so called "Bickerse league", and their more diplomatic cousin Cornelis de Graeff. With the Peace of Münster, the Regents wanted to reduce the army, saving money. That would also diminish William's authority. William imprisoned eight members of the States of Holland (including Jacob de Witt) in the castle of Loevestein. In addition, he sent his cousin, Willem Frederik of Nassau-Dietz with an army of 10,000 men to seize Amsterdam by force. Bad weather foiled this campaign, but Amsterdam did give in.

== Death ==
By early 1650, William's consort Mary was pregnant again. William for most of his life enjoyed quite good health. However, in late October-early November, when the princess's pregnancy was coming to an end, William fell ill with smallpox and died on 6 November (by the Gregorian Calendar), just after his attempt to capture Amsterdam from his political opponents. William served as stadtholder for only three years. His only son William was born eight days after his death (i.e. 14 November by the Gregorian Calendar, 4 November by the Julian Calendar). This was the beginning of the First Stadtholderless Period. His son succeeded him in 1672 as stadtholder and later, in 1689, also became King of England.

== Bibliography ==
- Herbert H. Rowen, The princes of Orange: the stadholders in the Dutch Republic. Cambridge and New York: Cambridge University Press, 1988.
- Herbert H. Rowen, The princes of Orange: the stadholders in the Dutch Republic. Cambridge and New York: Cambridge University Press, 2003.
- Herbert H. Rowen, "John de Witt, Grand Pensionary of Holland, 1625–1672". Princeton, N.J.: Princeton University Press, 1978.
- Herbert H. Rowen, "John de Witt: Statesman of the "True Freedom"". Cambridge University Press, 2003.
- Edmundson, George (1911). "William II., Prince of Orange" . Encyclopædia Britannica. Vol. 28 (11th ed.). pp. 674–675.
- Petrus Johannes Blok, "History of the people of the Netherlands". New York: G. P. Putnam's sons, 1898.
- Pieter Geyl, "Orange and Stuart, 1641–1672". Scribner, 1970.
- Jonathan I. Israel, "The Dutch Republic: Its Rise, Greatness, and Fall, 1477–1806" Oxford University Press, 1995. ISBN 0-19-820734-4

William II of Orange House of Orange-Nassau Cadet branch of the House of Nassau Born: 27 May 1626 Died: 6 November 1650
Regnal titles
Preceded by Frederick Henry	Prince of Orange; Baron of Breda; 1647–1650	Succeeded by William III
Political offices
Preceded by Frederick Henry	Stadtholder of Holland, Zeeland, Utrecht, Guelders and Overijssel; 1647–1650	Vacant First Stadtholderless Period Title next held by William III
