= Wendela Bicker =

Wife of Johan de Witt (1635–1668)

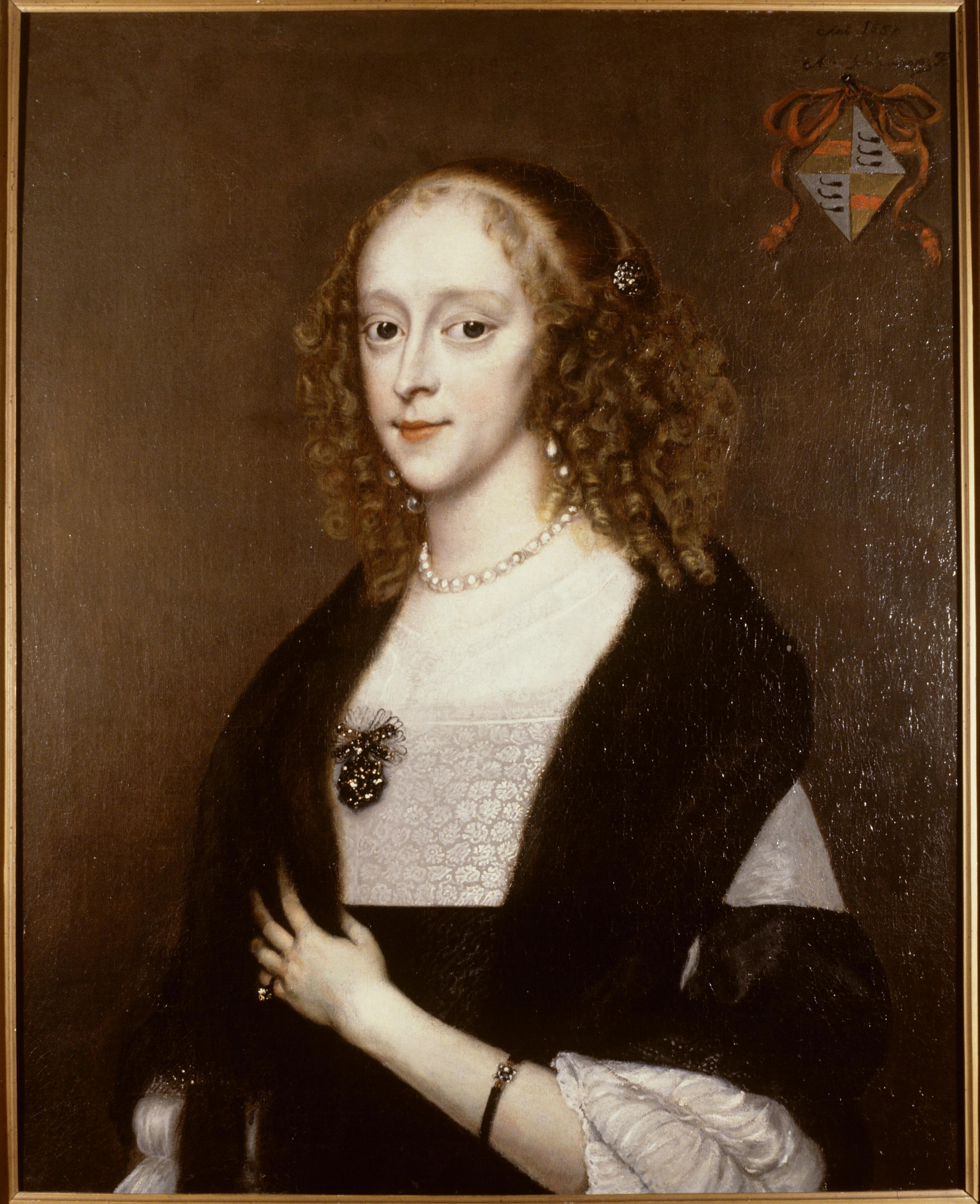
Wendela Bicker (1659), Portrait by Adriaen Hanneman

Wendela Bicker (Amsterdam, baptized 30 December 1635 – 1 July 1668) was the wife of Johan de Witt. She was one of the richest young female commoners of her time and she married one of the most influential republican politicians in the Netherlands. She was in the public eye during her lifetime and entered history books thereafter. This is facilitated by the letters and the housekeeping books she left behind. The narrative about her life reflects how the role of women in the Netherlands in the 17th century was and is understood.

== Biography ==
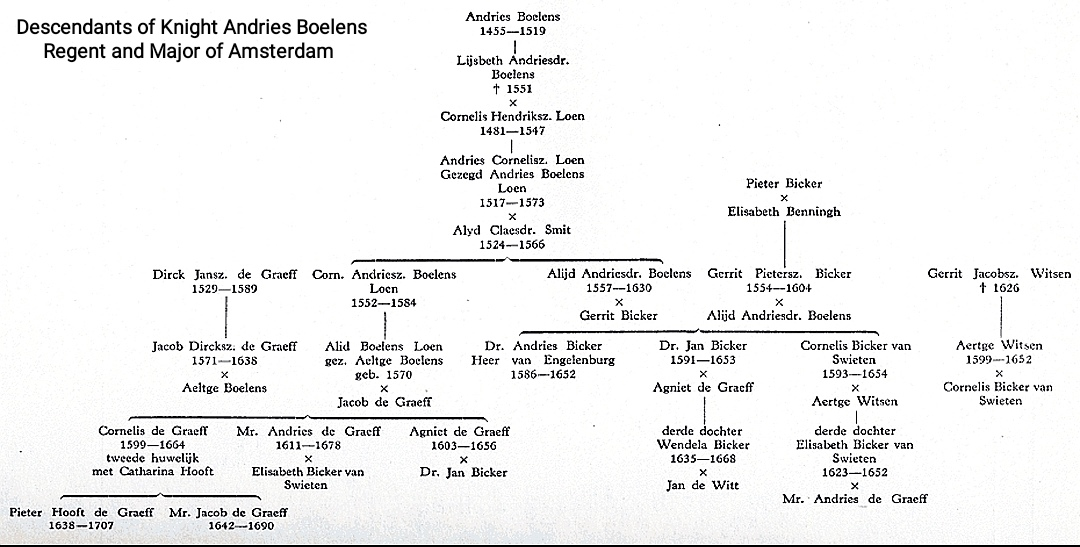
Overview of the personal family relationships of the Amsterdam oligarchy between the regent-dynasties Boelens Loen, De Graeff, Bicker (van Swieten), Witsen and Johan de Witt in the Dutch Golden Age

As the daughter of Amsterdam merchant and Mayor Jan Bicker (1591-1653) and Agneta de Graeff van Polsbroek (1603-1656), she was a descendant of the Bicker-De Graeff clan, the two most influential Amsterdam families of the Dutch Golden Age, and also relative of the families Hooft and of Volkert Overlander and Frans Banninck Cocq. Wendela grew up in a city house on Keizersgracht. Her sisters married influential people: Elisabeth Bicker (1630-1660) married the arms dealer Jacob Trip, Geertruid Bicker (1634-1702) married the wealthy banker and investor Jean Deutz, Cornelia Bicker (1638-1665) married her cousin Gerard Bicker (I) van Swieten and Jacoba Bicker (1640–1695) married her cousin Pieter de Graeff.

Wendela Bicker met her future husband Johan de Witt when her uncle Cornelis de Graeff met the young statesman. De Witt had been the first man in the republic as Grand pensionary since 1653, but kept a “miserable bachelor household” in The Hague. Johan's father Jacob de Witt urged him to find a wife befitting his rank, to start a family and a "tidy household" with her. Wendela made this undertaking easier for him insofar as she presented herself as a "gentle woman of slender and graceful growth", "with blond curls and gentle eyes". In the late summer of 1654, De Witt began courting her. On 16 February 1655 the couple married in the Nieuwe Kerk in Amsterdam. Holland's national poet, Joost van den Vondel, recited a poem written for the occasion at the celebration. After the wedding, the young couple moved to The Hague, where de Witt worked as council pensioner of Holland and West Friesland in the Binnenhof. On the advice of the English ambassador, William Temple, the couple set up a large household with numerous servants and two liveried servants for the council pensioner in their new residence in the "Hofsingel".

Within twelve years of marriage, Wendela gave birth to eight children, three of whom died young. She took her mother's job very seriously, ran the household herself and also looked after Johan's elderly father, Jacob. In the long run, however, this exceeded their strength. When her two-year-old daughter Elisabeth died in June 1668, Wendela was at the end of her strength and she died after four days of illness at the end of June or beginning of July of the same year. Wendela Bicker was buried on 6 July in the family grave in Amsterdam's Nieuwe Kerk with a large turnout of the population.

Many family members helped Johan de Witt by looking after his five children, including Johan de Witt, during this difficult time. After de Witt's murder in the summer of 1672, Wendela's cousin Pieter de Graeff became the breadwinner for the orphans.

== Legacy ==
Bicker's legacy continues to be a topic for research and discussion. Jan Romein's entry about Bicker in the Nieuw Nederlandsch biografisch woordenboek, dated 1937 depicts her as a loving and caring spouse, not very bright and not very attractive, low-key and loyal. Recent studies provide more depth to her character. Marinka Joosten at Huygens ING sustains that Bicker played a significant role in strengthening her husband's social and family networks, providing the needed stability. Bicker's letters to her husband and the cashbook she kept provide a unique insight in housekeeping and fashion in the Netherlands in the 17th century. After her death on 1 July 1668, her sister, Jacoba, sold Bicker's jewelry, including 300 pearls. She had a modest wedding, with only 71 participants. This may not have been by choice, but imposed by an edict issued by mayor Nicolaes Tulp limiting the number of participants at any wedding. The mayor may have been upset because De Witt did not marry Tulp's daughter. Bicker accommodated to the situation and played the role befitting to a leading politician's spouse.

=== Portraits and artwork ===
Bicker was described and depicted during and after her lifetime.

- A portrait by Adriaen Hannemann, dated 1659, is in the Teding van Berkhout collection. See infobox.
- Joost van den Vondel wrote a poem about the wedding.
- The engraving by Reinier Vinkeles after a drawing by Abraham Teerlink, dated 1805
- A portrait by Herman Verelst in the Rijksmuseum was believed to depict Wendela Bicker but more recently this was rejected. Copies of this portrait still carry the name Wendela Bicker.
- Modern artist Natasja Kensmil included a painting of the wedding between Johan de Witt and Wendela Bicker in her exhibition at the Stedelijk Museum in 2020 to explore power relations.
- In the 2015 Michiel de Ruyter movie, the role of Bicker is played by Lieke van Lexmond.

== Literature (selection) ==
- Herbert H. Rowen: John de Witt – Statesman of the „True Freedom“. Cambridge University Press, 1986, ISBN 0-521-52708-2.
- C. A. van Sypesteyn: Mededeelingen omtrent het huiselijk leven van Johan de Witt en zijne vrouw Wendela Bicker. Haagsche Stemmen 1 (1887/1888), S. 155–167 und 245–255.
- Tjaherta Johanna Servatius: Wendela Bicker. In: Tjaherta Johanna Servatius (Hrsg.): Vrouwen uit onze historie. Callenbach, Nijkerk 1940, S. 170–180.
- A. M. H. Smeenge: Wendela Bicker. In: Jaarboek van het Genootschap Amstelodamum. Band 35, ISSN 0923-0254 De Bussy, Amsterdam 1938, S. 89–105.
