= Adriaen Hanneman =

Dutch Golden Age painter (c. 1603–1671)

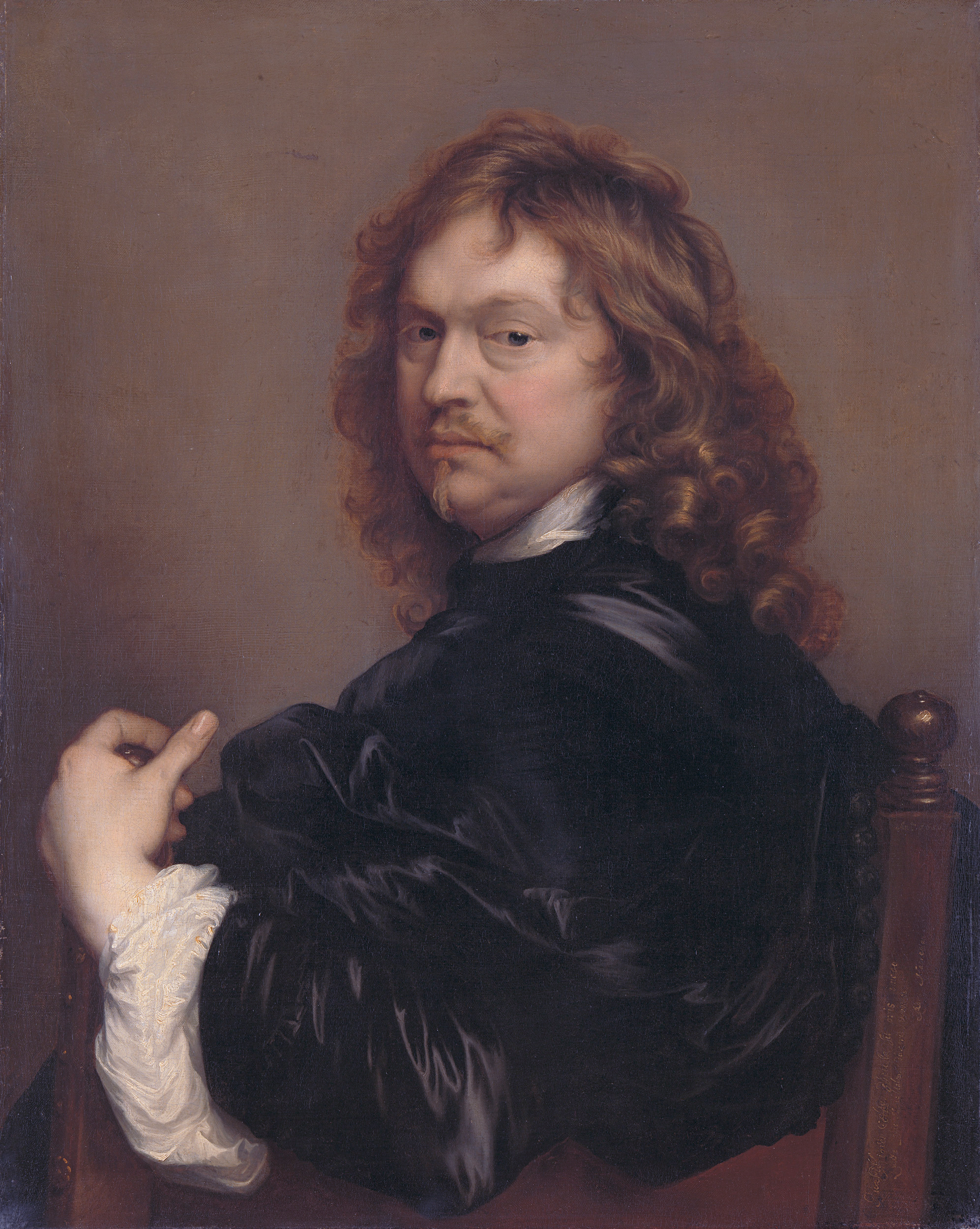
- Self-portrait 1656.
- Born: Adriaen Hanneman; 1603; The Hague
- Died: 1671 (aged 67–68); The Hague
- Known for: Painting
- Movement: Baroque

Adriaen Hanneman (c. 1603 – buried 11 July 1671) was a Dutch Golden Age painter best known for his portraits of the exiled British royal court. His style was strongly influenced by his contemporary, Anthony van Dyck.

== Biography ==
He was born into a wealthy Catholic patrician family in The Hague, and studied drawing with Hague portrait artist Jan Antonisz. van Ravesteyn. He left for England in 1623 where he lived for 16 years. There he met and was influenced by Anthony van Dyck, Cornelis Janssens van Ceulen, and Daniel Mytens. He enjoyed the patronage of Constantijn Huygens, who introduced him at court. He returned to The Hague, where he married the daughter of his old drawing teacher, Maria van Ravesteyn, in 1640. In 1645 he became deacon of the Guild of St. Luke. In 1656 he was one of the dissenters who split off into the Confrerie Pictura, which he headed the first period. In 1666 he was awarded a silver goblet for his years of service to this group. After his first wife died, he married a second time to Alida Bezemer in 1669. His pupils were Jeremias van der Eyden, Reinier de la Haye, Marcus van der Linde, Gijsbert van Lybergen, Simon du Parcq, Bernardus van der Vechte, Jan Jansz. Westerbaen (II), and Cornelis Wildt. He influenced the painter Govert Flinck.

Like so many other Catholic painters, he fell on hard times soon after this as the Rampjaar approached. Records show him selling possessions again and again in 1670, and the next year he died in The Hague, leaving all of his drawings and engravings to his student Simon du Parcq. Though he had been a highly respected and successful man, his entire estate only brought 1,000 guilders.

== Hanneman's portraits ==
Hanneman is best known for court portraits of the British and Dutch nobility, usually painted in imitation of the style of Anthony van Dyck. According to some sources, he may have worked in the studio of Van Dyke in London. Later, in the Hague, he painted several English Royalists who had gone into exile in the Netherlands after the English Civil War.

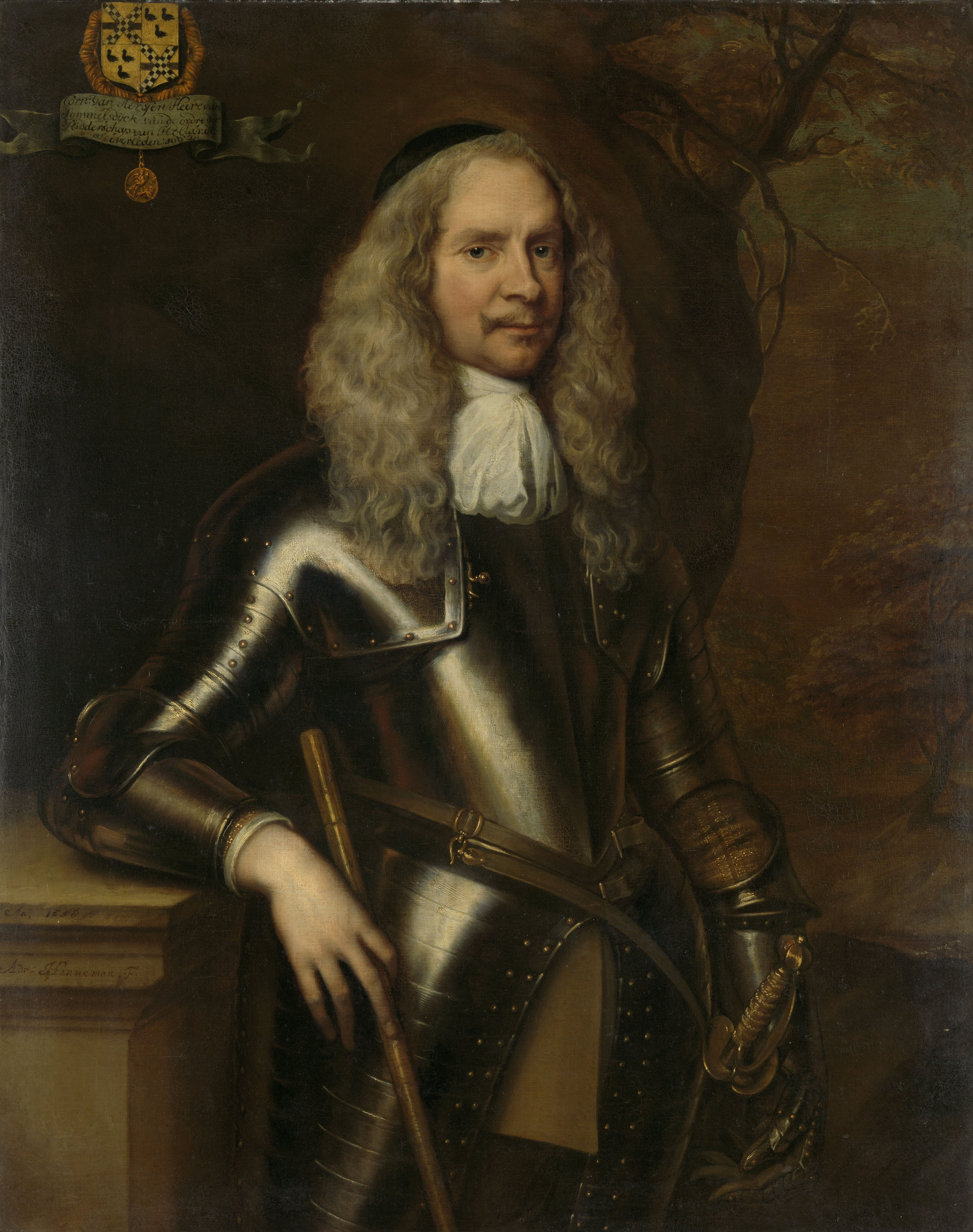
Cornelis van Aerssen van Sommelsdijck, Rijksmuseum Amsterdam

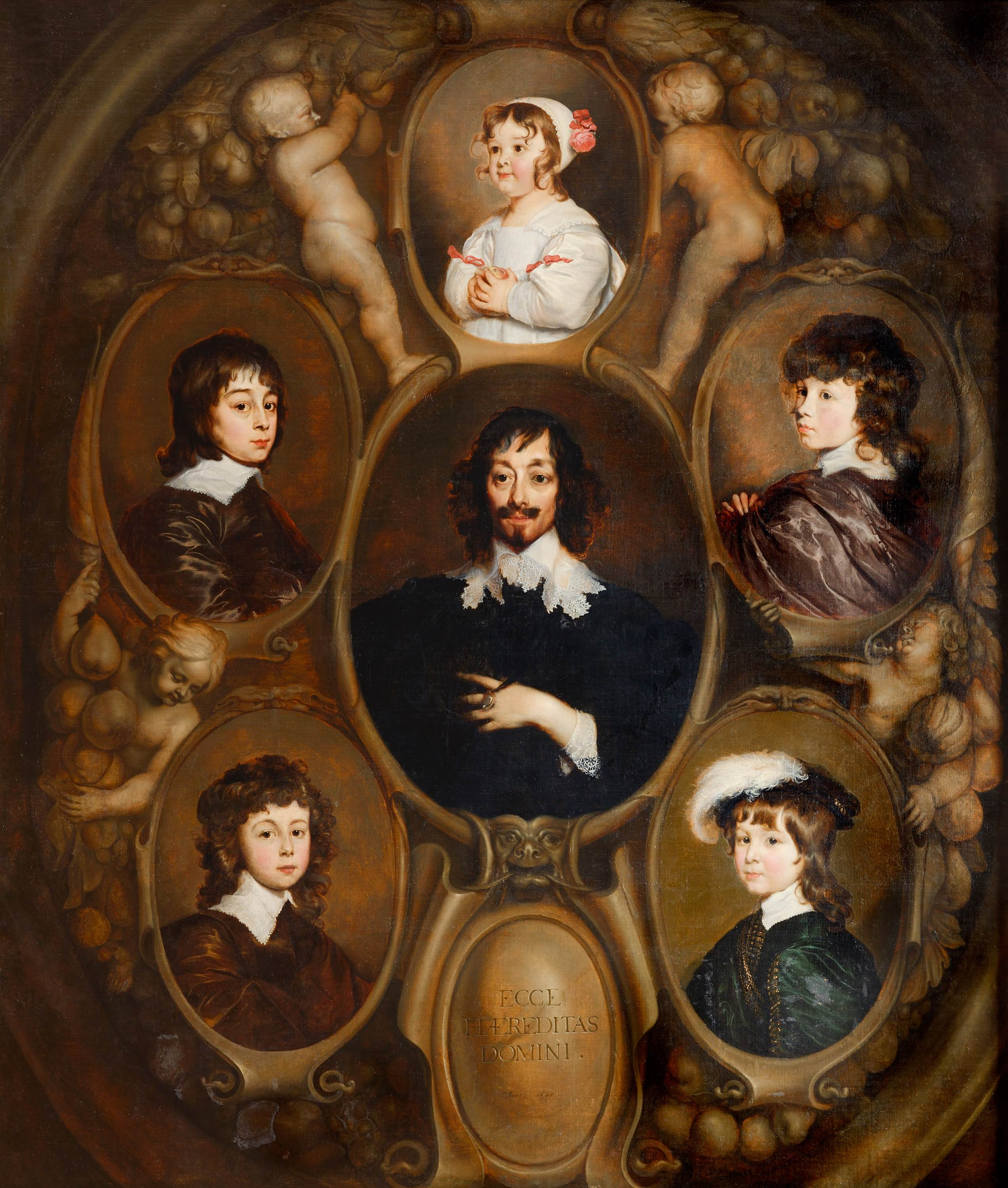
Family of Constantijn Huygens

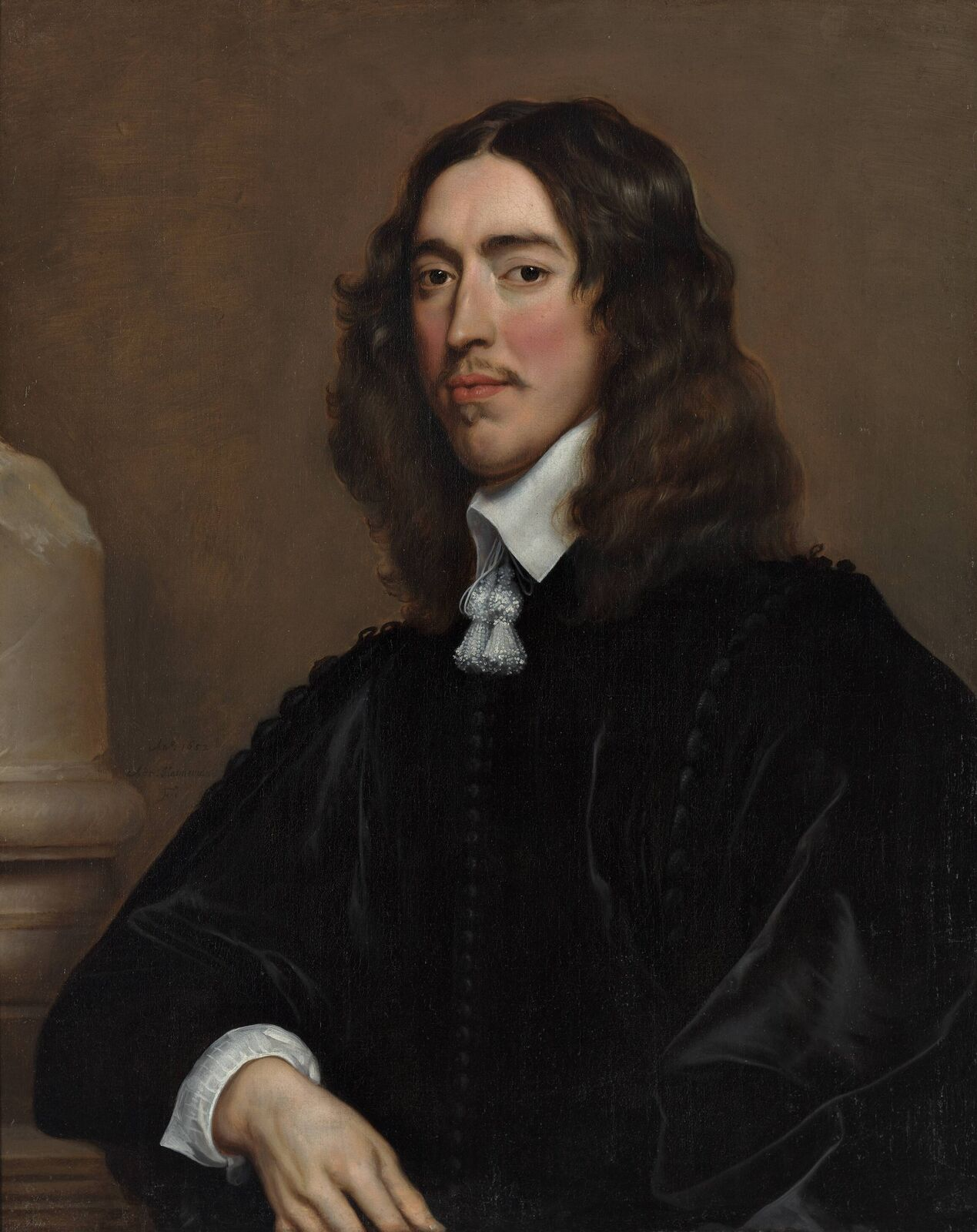
Johan de Witt

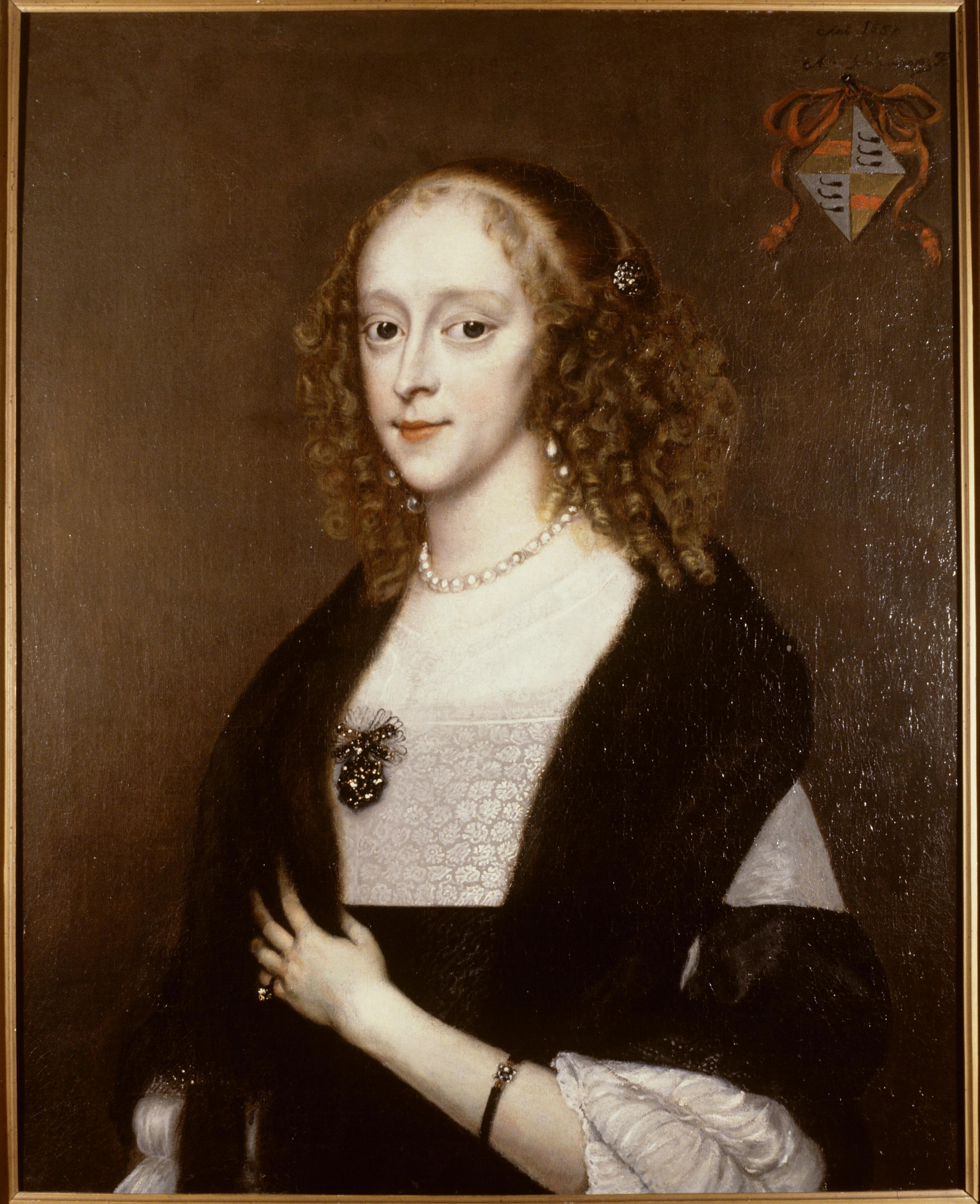
Wendela Bicker (1635–1668), wife of Johan de Witt, 1659

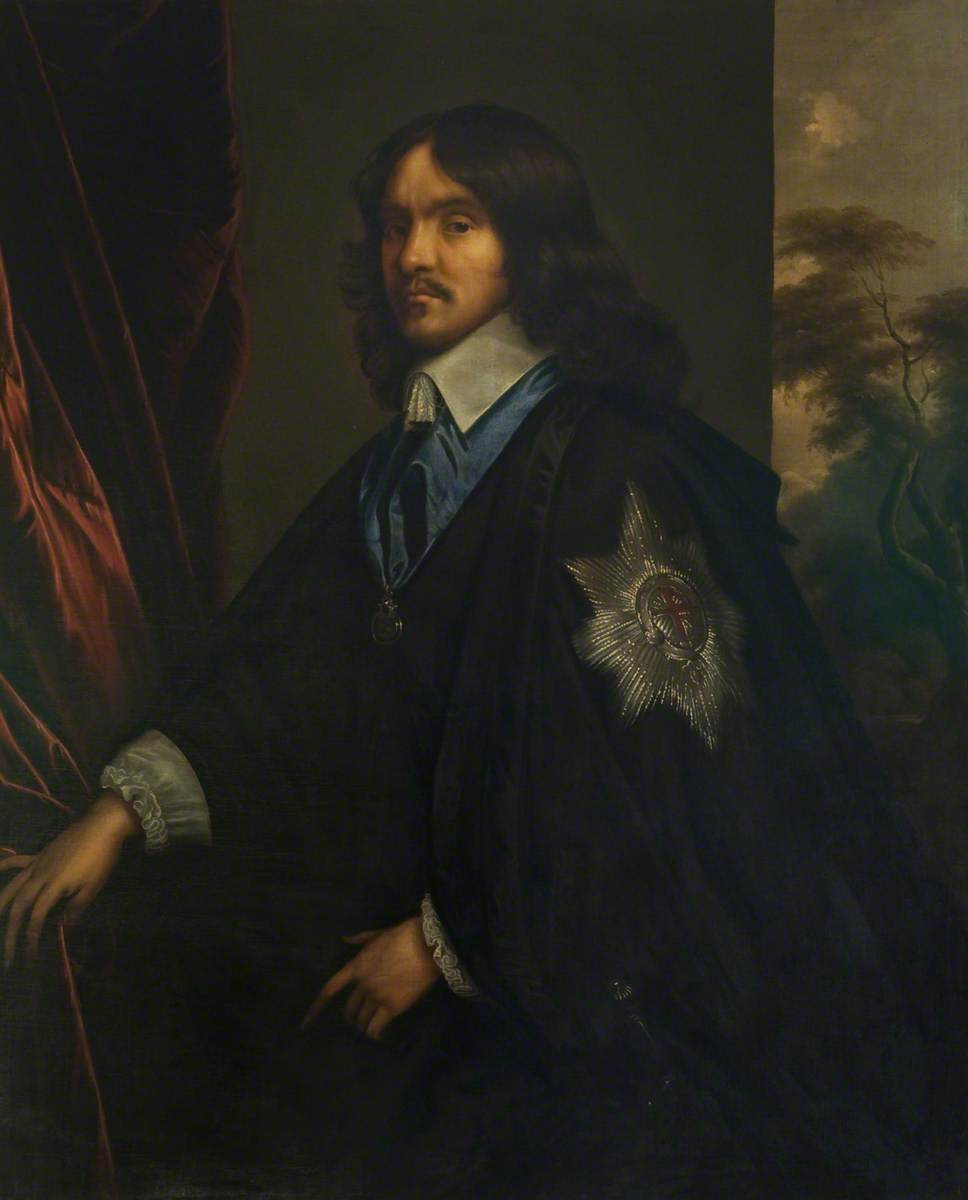
William Hamilton, Second Duke Hamilton, National Portrait Gallery, London

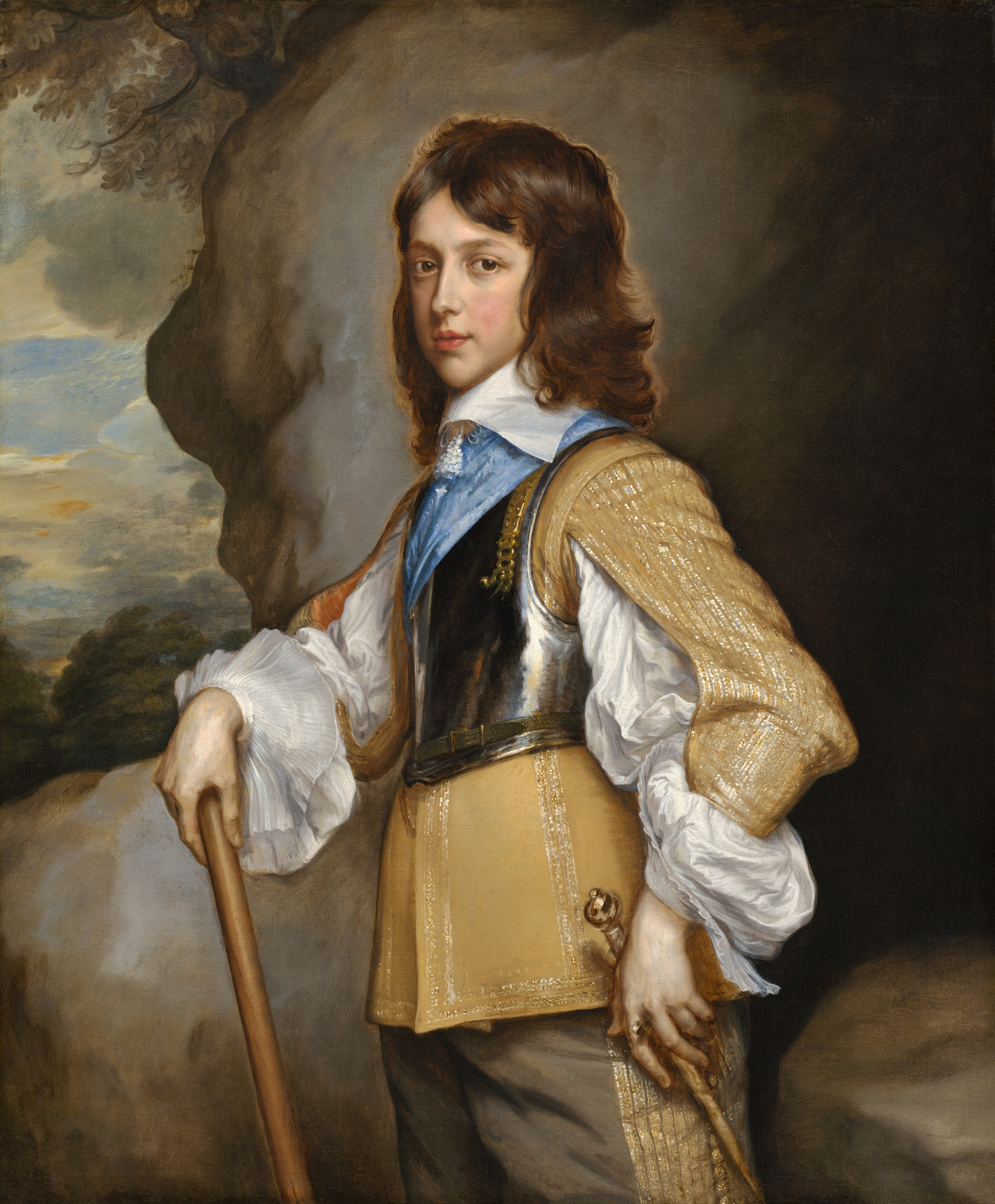
Henry, Duke of Gloucester, National Gallery of Art, Washington

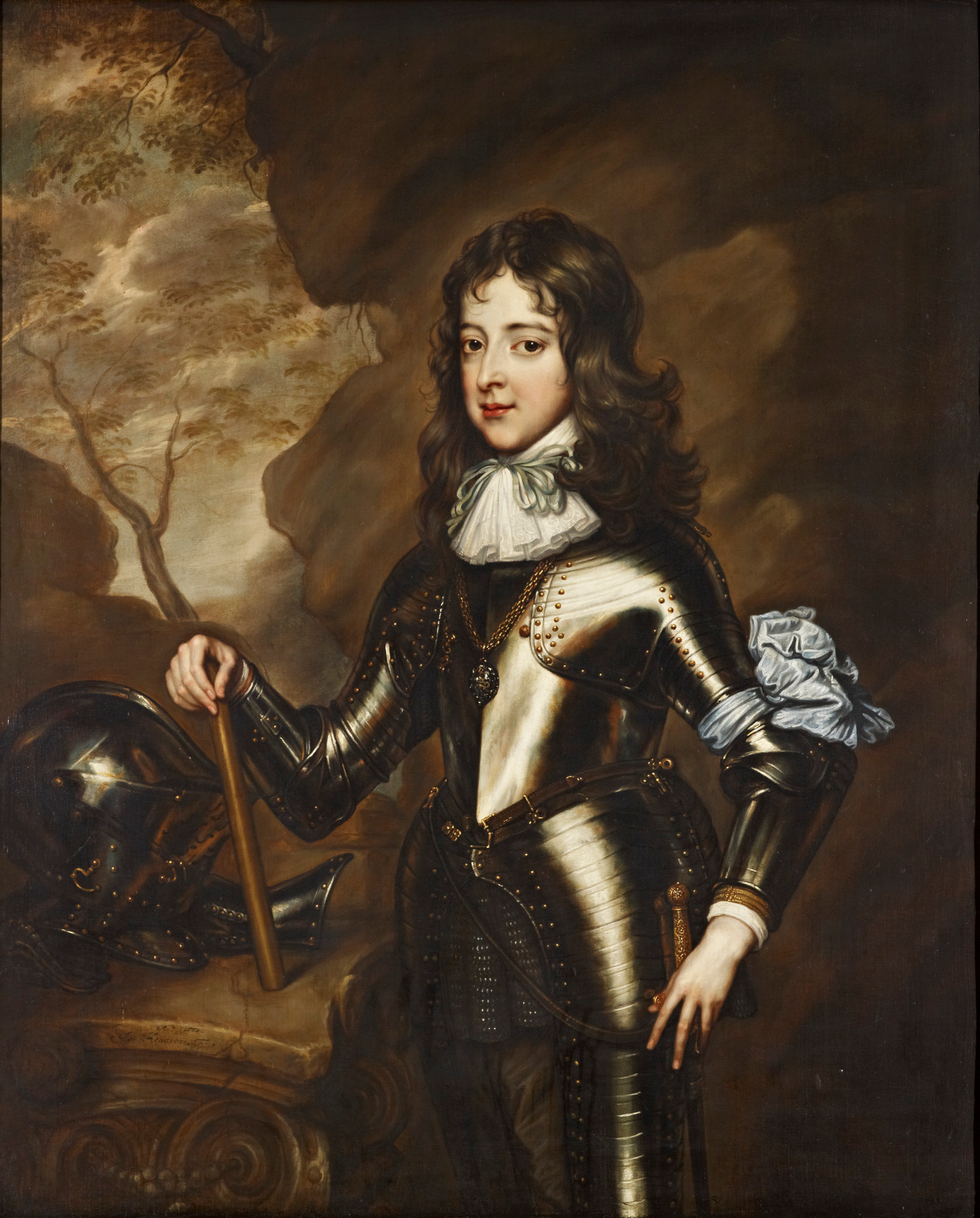
William III when Prince of Orange

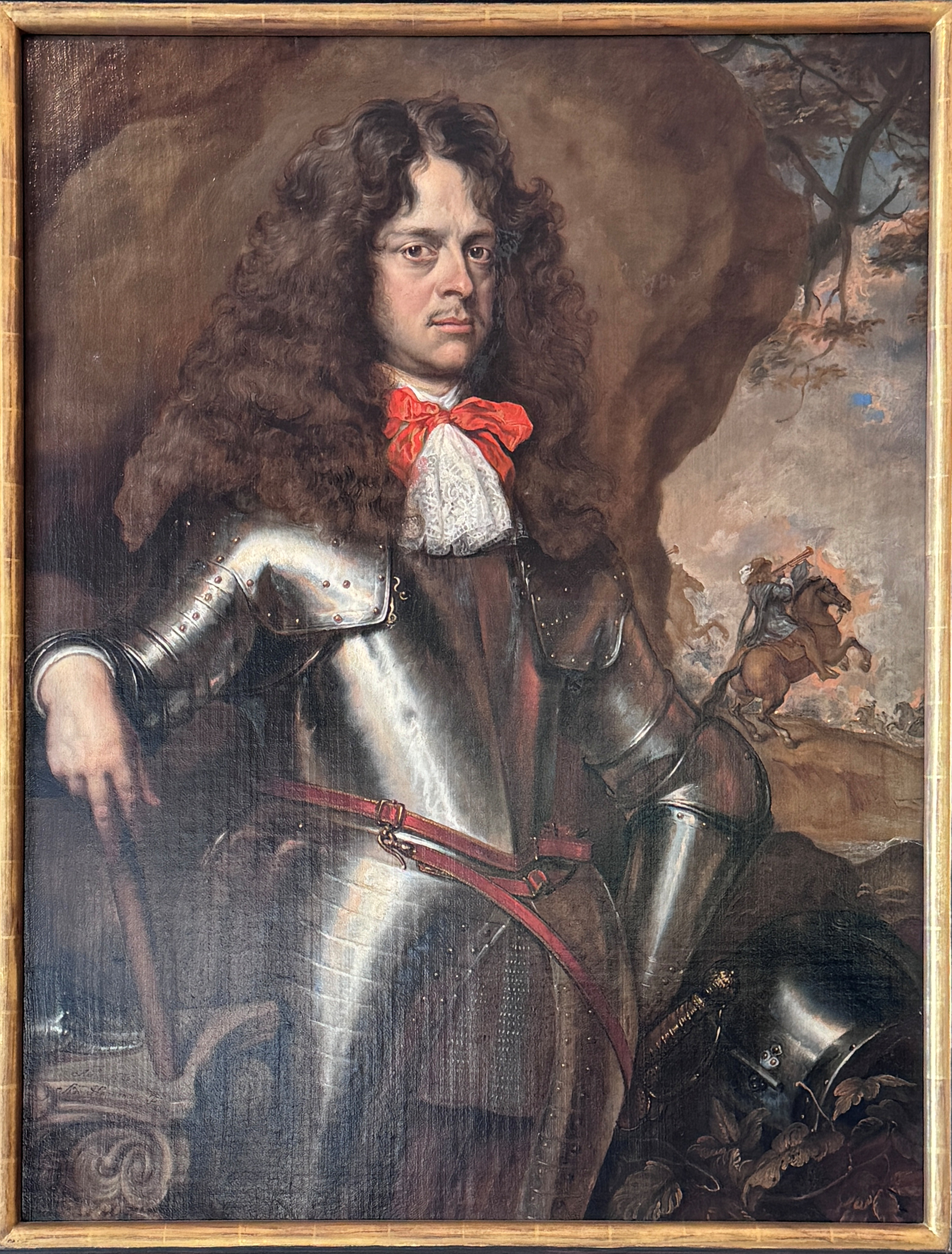
Johann Georg II of Anhalt-Dessau, 1666, Anhaltische Gemäldegalerie Dessau

In about 1639, soon after returning from England, he painted a portrait of the Dutch scientist Christiaan Huygens (1629–1695), a contemporary of Isaac Newton, who discovered the wave theory of light, Saturn's rings and the pendulum clock.

In about 1648, he painted Charles, the Prince of Wales, later Charles II of England, when he was in The Hague staying with his sister. The original painting is lost, but about thirty copies were made, and are found in different museums, including the Ashmolean Museum at Oxford.

In about 1654, he painted the four-year-old William III, Prince of Orange, wearing the sash of the Order of the Garter. (now in the Rijksmuseum in Amsterdam.)

In about 1664 he painted Maria I Stuart (1631–1660), the wife of Prince William II. The painting (now in the Mauritshuis in the Netherlands) was made several years after her death, at the request of her son, Willem III. Mary is painted wearing a South American cloak of colored feathers, and a headdress of pearls and ostrich feathers. Such cloaks had been brought to the Netherlands from Brazil as early as 1644.

== Paintings by Hanneman in public museums ==
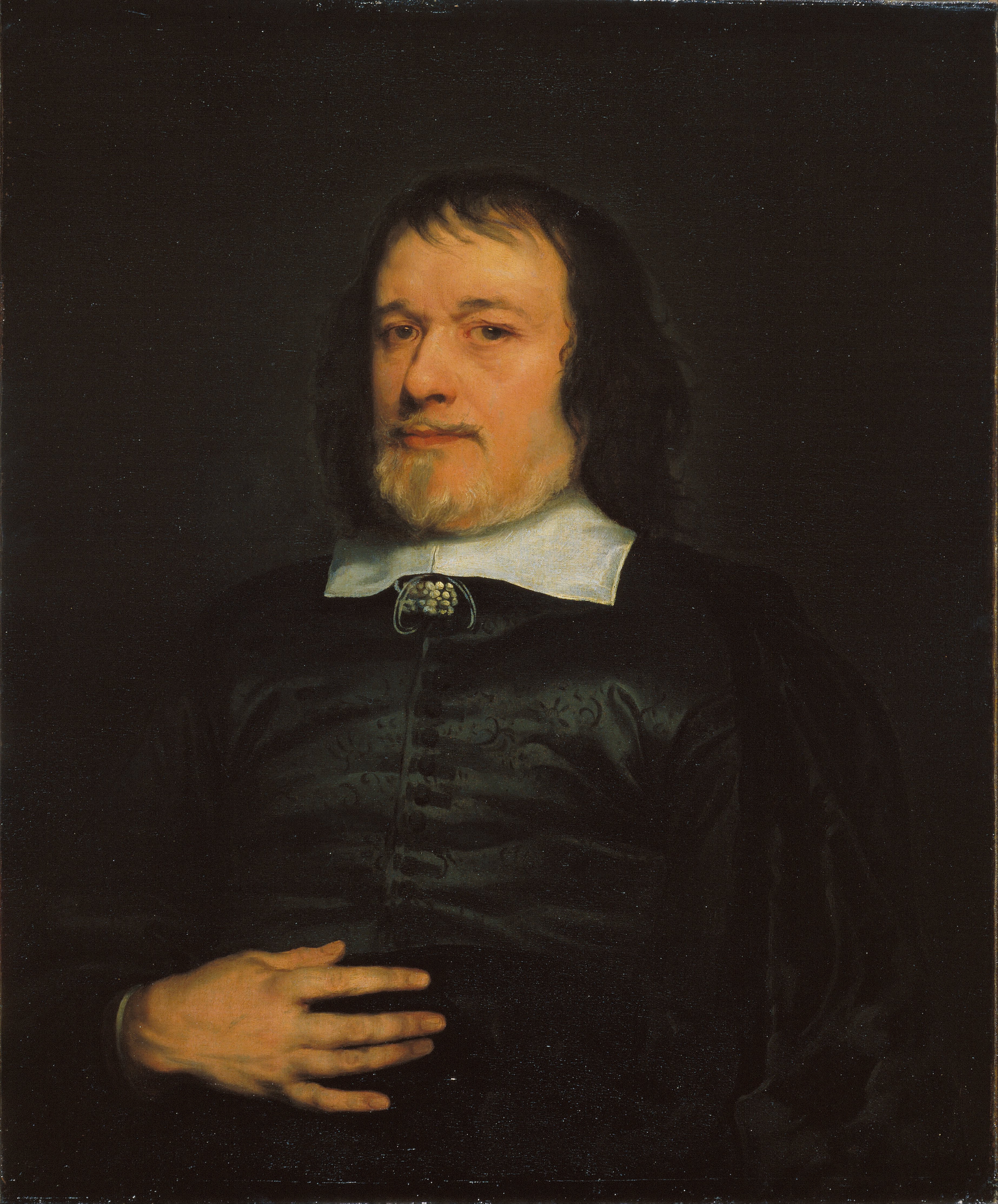
Portrait of a Gentleman (circa 1655), Museu Nacional d'Art de Catalunya

- Portrait of a Woman, Metropolitan Museum of Art, New York.
- Portrait of a Woman, (1653), Pushkin Museum of Fine Arts, Moscow
- Henry, Duke of Gloucester (c. 1653), National Gallery of Art, Washington D.C.
- Prince William III (1654), Rijksmuseum, Amsterdam.
- Posthumous Portrait of Mary I Stuart with a Servant, Mauritshuis Museum.
- Johann Georg II of Anhalt-Dessau (1666), Anhaltische Gemäldegalerie Dessau.
- Portrait of Lady Lucy Percy, Minneapolis Institute of Art.
- William Hamilton, Second Duke of Hamilton, National Portrait Gallery, London.
- Charles II as Prince of Wales (copies of lost original), Ashmolean Museum, Oxford and National Portrait Gallery, London.
- Two Boys and a Bubble, The Norton Museum of Art in West Palm Beach Florida
- Mary Lucas (1636), National Gallery of Victoria, Melbourne, Victoria

== Sources ==
- Wheelock Jr., Arthur K. "Dutch Paintings of the Seventeenth Century - The Collections of the National Gallery of Art" Systematic Catalog. Washington DC, 1995, pgs. 91–92.
- Cust, Lionel Henry (1891). "Hanneman, Adriaen" . In Stephen, Leslie; Lee, Sidney (eds.). Dictionary of National Biography. Vol. 25. London: Smith, Elder & Co.
