= Jan Victors =

Dutch Golden Age painter (1619–1676)

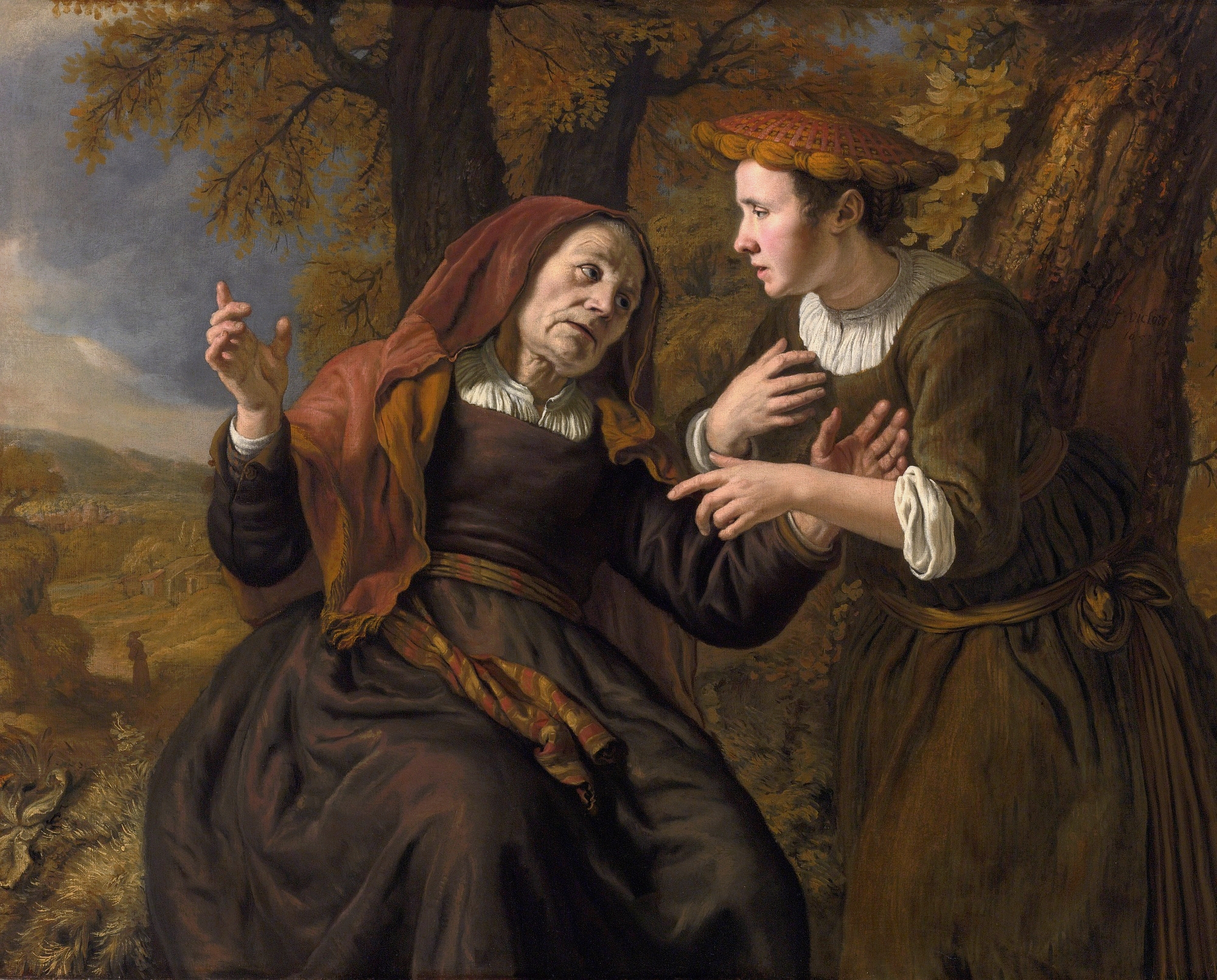
Ruth swearing to Naomi, 1653

Jan Victors (or Fictor; 1619 – 1676) was a Dutch Golden Age painter mainly of history paintings of Biblical scenes, with some genre scenes. He may have been a pupil of Rembrandt. He probably died in the Dutch East Indies.

He was a conscientious member of the Calvinist Dutch Reformed Church, and for this reason he avoided creating art which depicts Christ, angels, or nudity.

== Biography ==
Victors was born in Amsterdam. He was described in a Haarlem tax listing in 1622 as a student of Rembrandt van Rijn. Though it is not certain that he worked for Rembrandt, it is clear from his Young girl at a window that he had looked carefully at Rembrandt's paintings. He was only twenty when he painted this scene, and the look of expectation on the girl's face shows a remarkable study of character. He seems to have abandoned painting well before the rampjaar of 1672, when, like many painters in Amsterdam, he fell onto bad times and took a position as ziekentrooster (lit. 'comforter of the sick'), a role as professional nurse and cleric, with the Dutch East India Company in 1676. He probably died soon after arrival in Indonesia, then the Dutch East Indies.

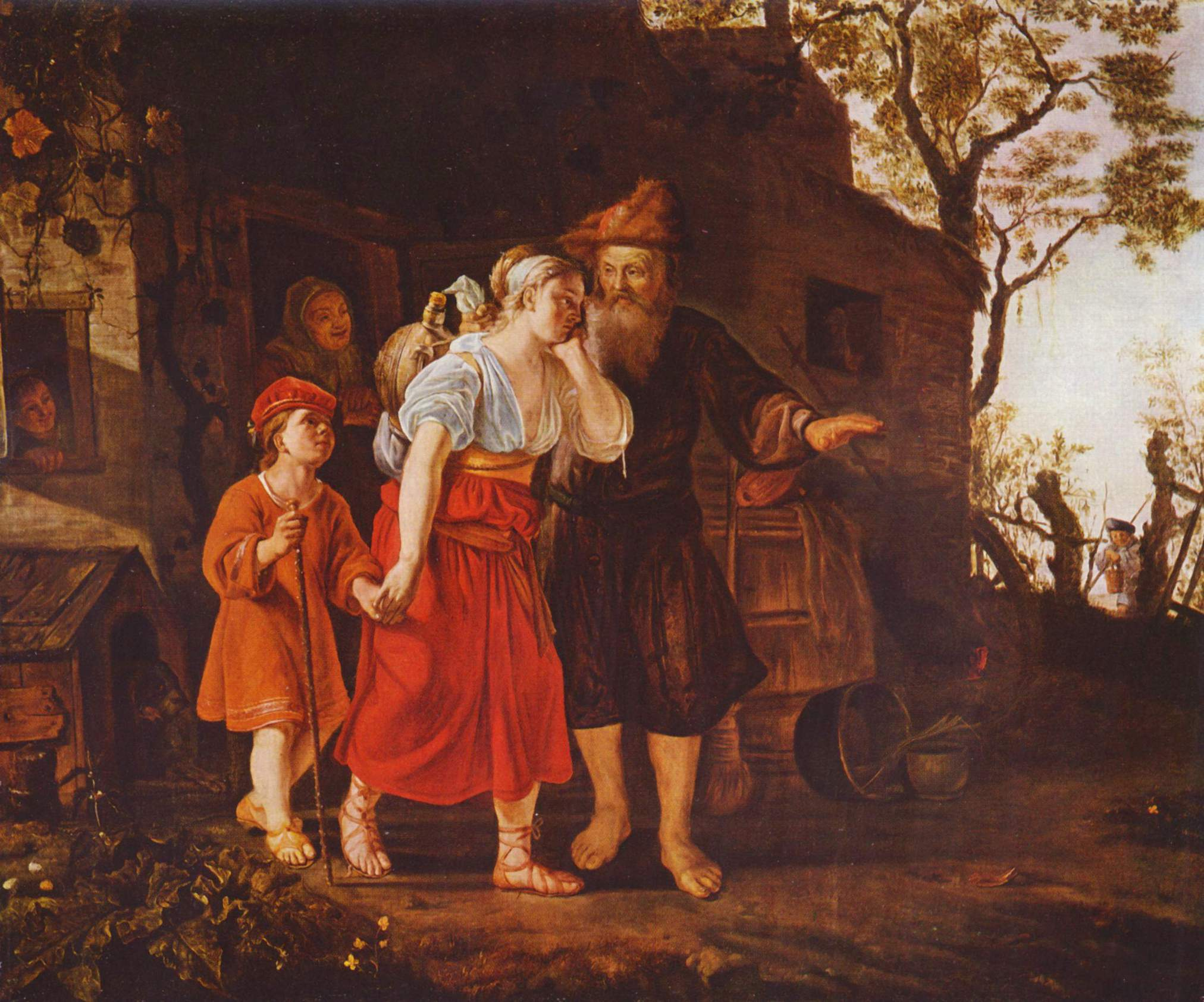
The Banishment of Hagar and Ishmael, 1635 Budapest.

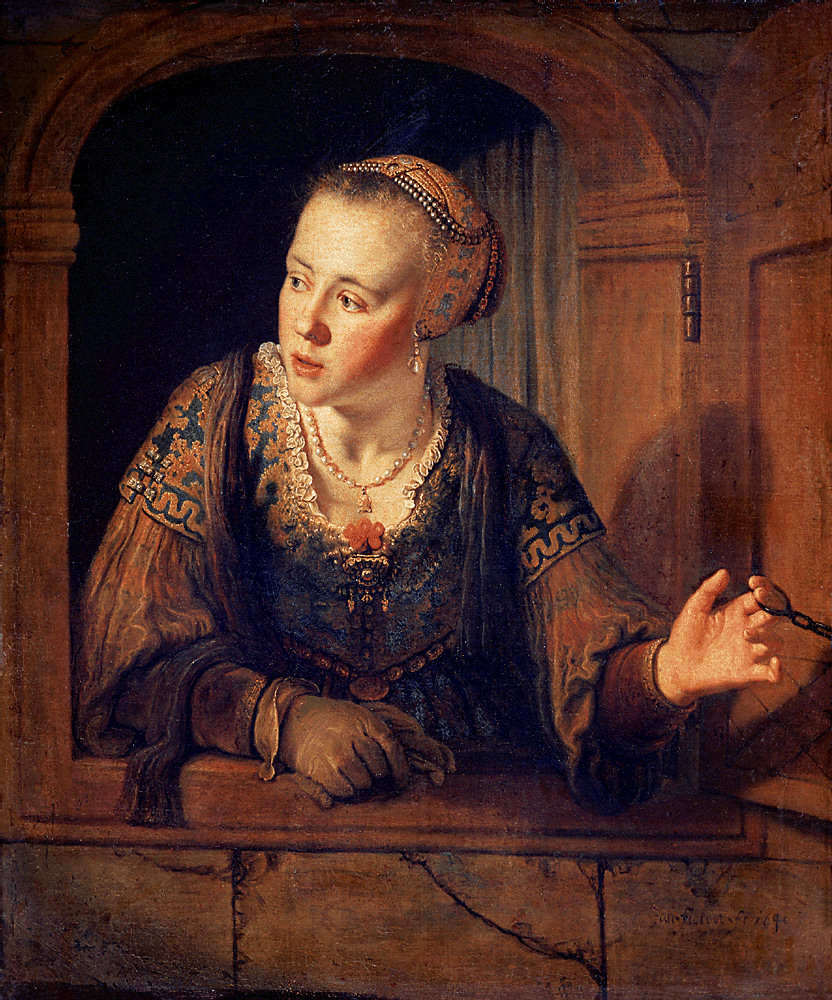
Young girl at a window, 1640, Louvre.

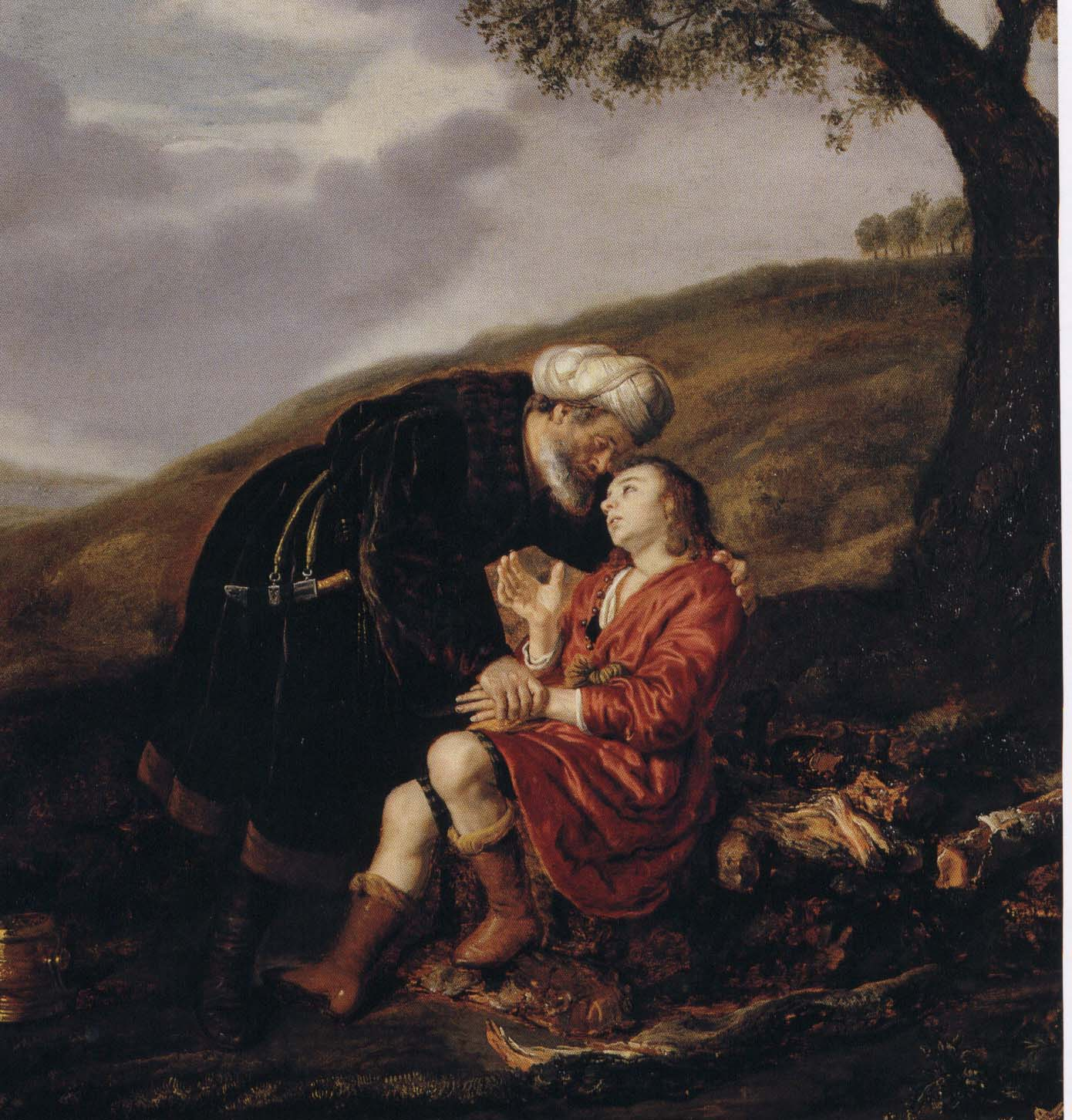
Abraham and Isaac before the Sacrifice, Tel Aviv Museum of Art, 1642.

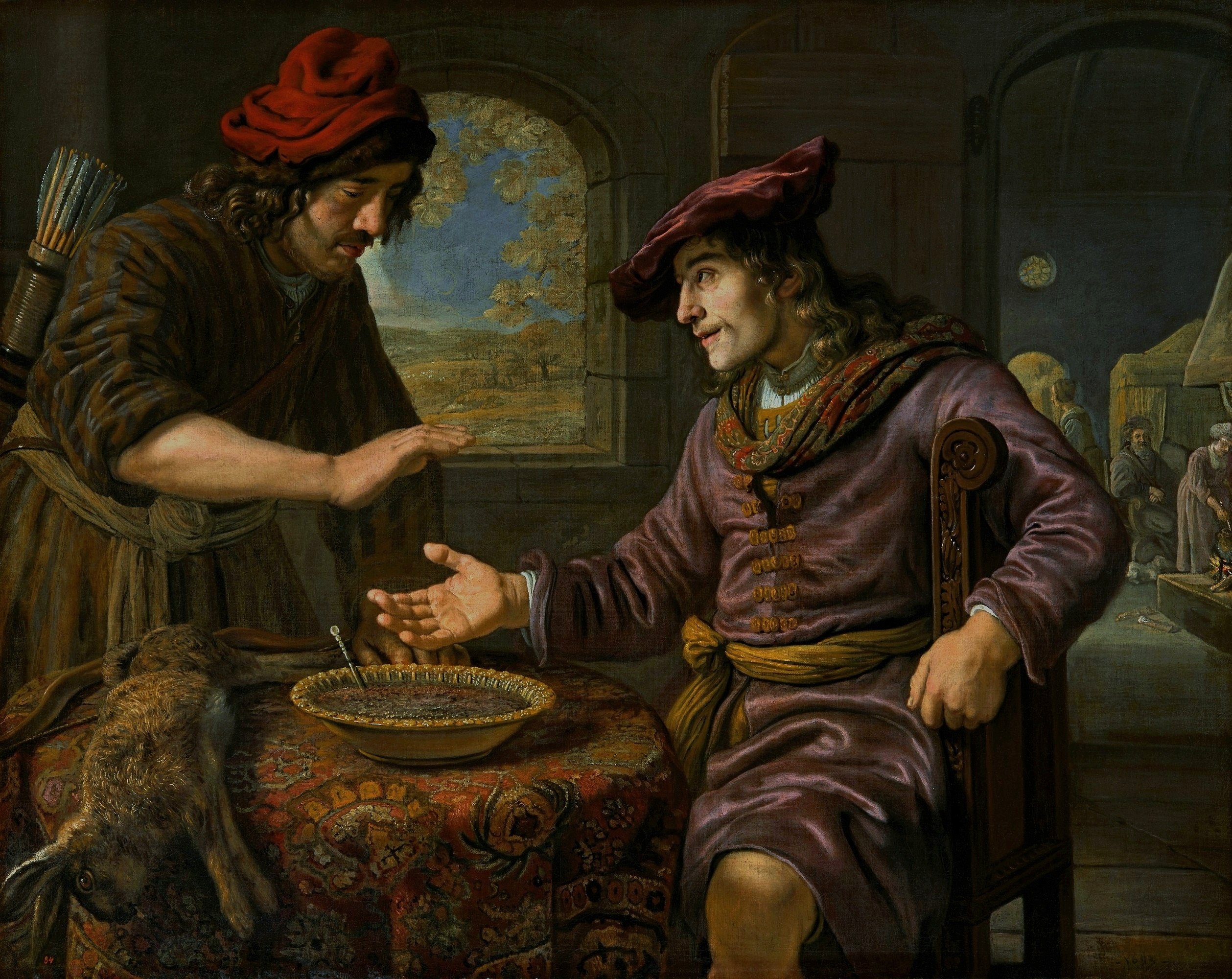
Esau and the Mess of Pottage, 1653.

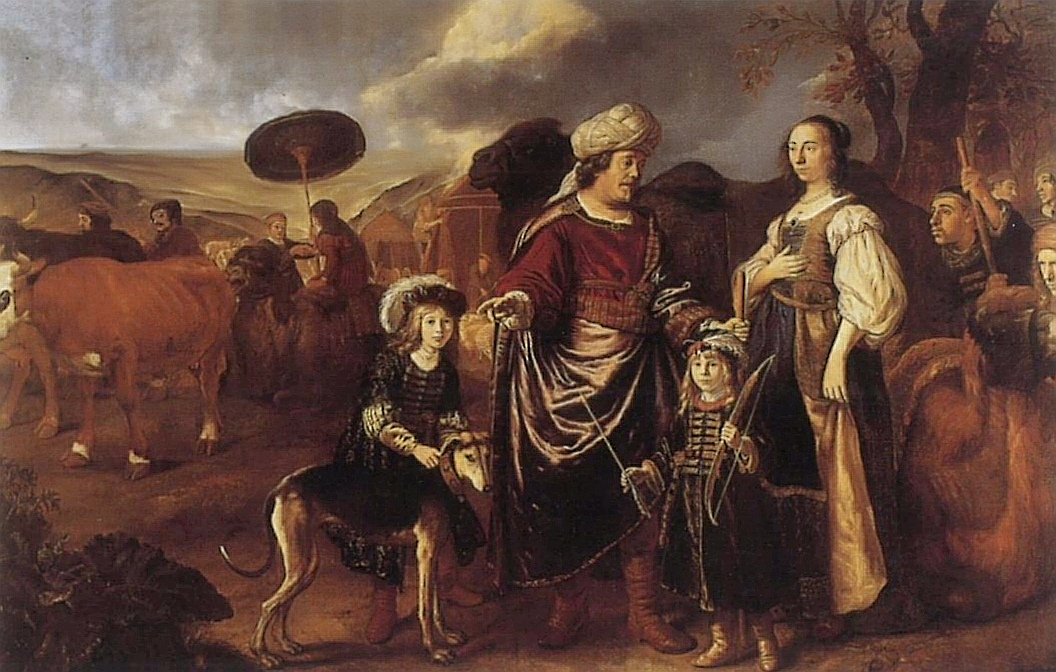
Allegory of Cornelis de Graeff as leader of his people: Cornelis de Graeff as Isaac with his wife Catharina Hooft as Rebecca with their sons Pieter and Jacob de Graeff as Jacob and Esau (1652)
