= Pieter de Graeff =

Dutch politician and noble (1638–1707)

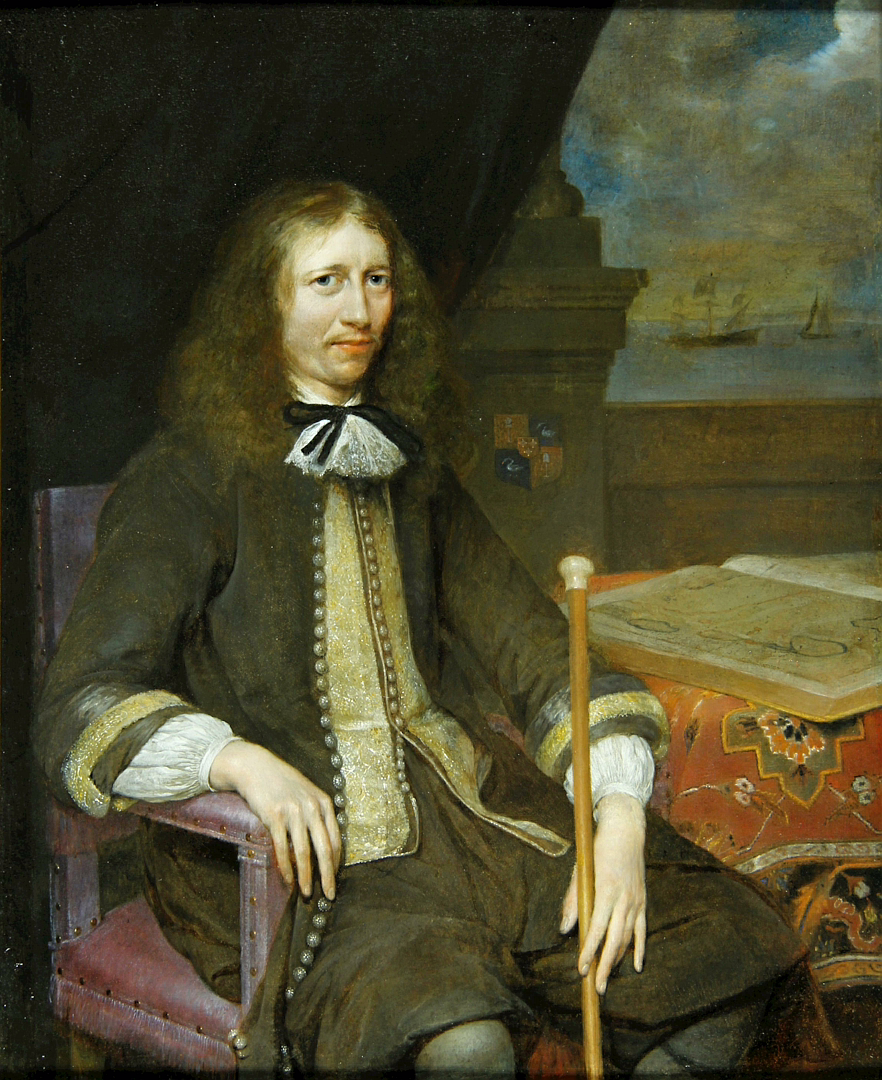

President-bewindhebber of the Dutch East Indies Company
- In office 1664–1707
- Preceded by: Cornelis de Graeff

Personal details
- Born: 1638 Amsterdam
- Died: 1707 (aged 68–69) Amsterdam
- Party: Dutch States Party
- Spouse: Jacoba Bicker van Swieten
- Relations: Cornelis de Graeff (father); Catharina Hooft (mother); Andries de Graeff (uncle); Johan de Witt (cousin)
- Children: Johan and Cornelis
- Occupation: Regent, Landlord
- Profession: Jurist

Pieter de Graeff (15 August 1638 – 3 June 1707) was a Dutch aristocrat of the Dutch Golden Age and one of the most influential pro-state, republican Amsterdam Regents during the late 1660s and the early 1670s before the Rampjaar 1672. As president-bewindhebber of the Dutch East India Company, he was one of the most important representatives and leaders of the same after the Rampjaar.

De Graeff's political stance was characteristic of his family, on the one hand libertine and 'state oriented', republican on the other hand, if only partially, loyal to the House of Orange, the royalists. He held the titles as Free Lord of Zuid-Polsbroek and 19.th Free Lord of Ilpendam and Purmerland. De Graeff was in intimate contact with the statesmen Johan de Witt and Willem III of Orange, the painter Jan Lievens and the poet Joost van den Vondel.

== Biography ==
=== Family De Graeff ===
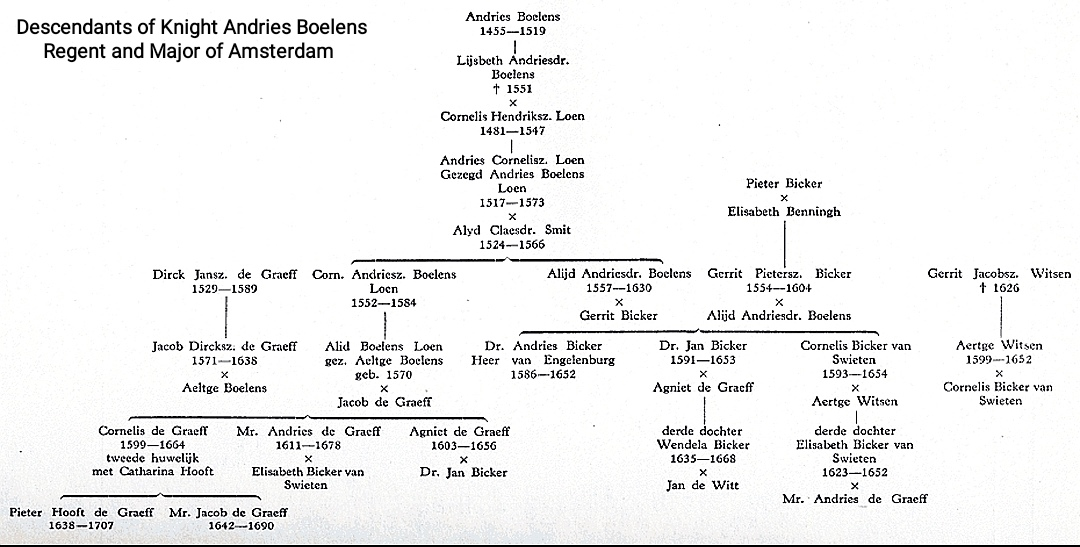
Overview of the personal family relationships of the Amsterdam oligarchy between the regent-dynasties Boelens Loen, De Graeff, Bicker (van Swieten), Witsen and Johan de Witt in the Dutch Golden Age

Pieter de Graeff was a son of the Amsterdam regent and statesman Cornelis de Graeff and Catharina Hooft and older brother of Jacob de Graeff. The De Graeff family belonged to the ruling states oriented patriciate of the province of Holland. Both Pieter's father and his uncle Andries de Graeff were critical of the Orange family's influence. Together with the Republican political leader Grand Pensionary Johan de Witt, the De Graeff family strived for the abolition of stadtholderships, but also try to keep a good relationship with them and their sympathizers. They desired the full sovereignty of the individual regions in a form in which the Republic of the Seven United Netherlands was not ruled by a single person. Instead of a sovereign (or stadtholder) the political and military power was lodged with the States General and with the regents of the cities in Holland.

During the two decades the De Graeff family had a leading role in the Amsterdam administration, the city was at the peak of its political power. This period was also referred to by Republicans as the ‘Ware Vrijheid’ (True Freedom). It was the First Stadtholderless Period which lasted from 1650 to 1672. During these twenty years, the regents from Holland and in particular those of Amsterdam, controlled the republic. The city was flush with self-confidence and liked to compare itself to the famous Republic of Rome. Even without a stadtholder, things seemed to be going well for the Republic and its regents both politically and economically.

=== Coat of arms ===
Coat of arms

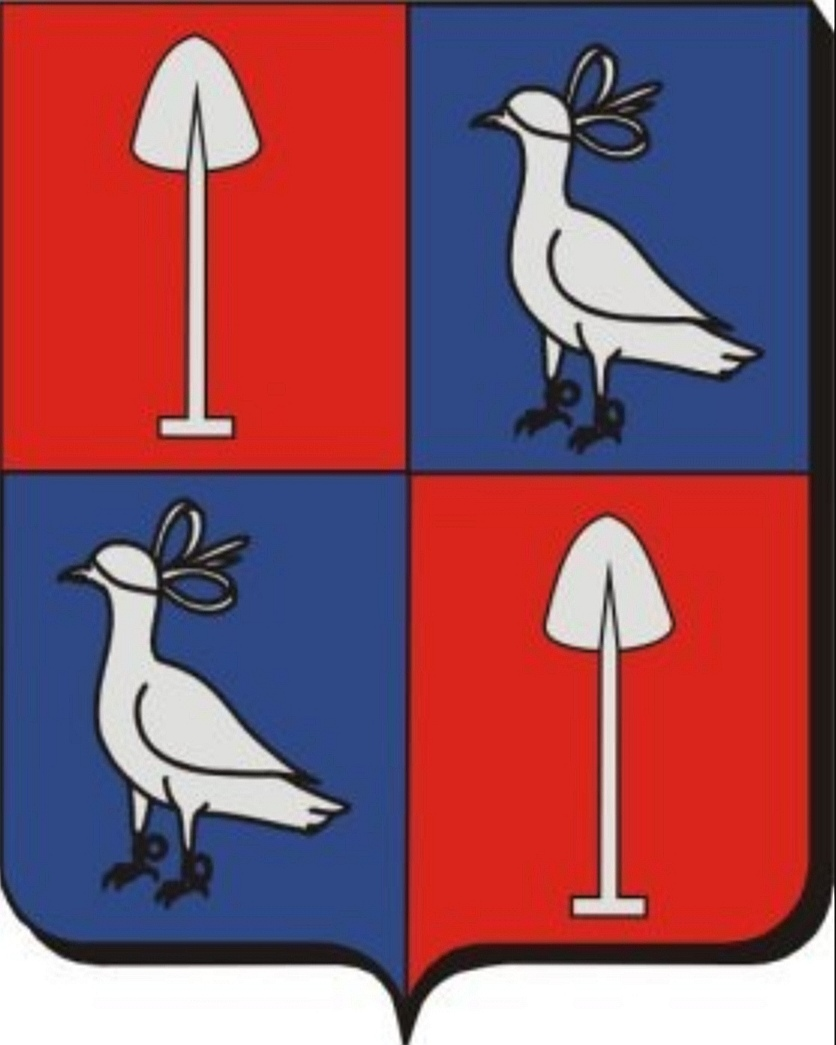
Ancient coat of arms

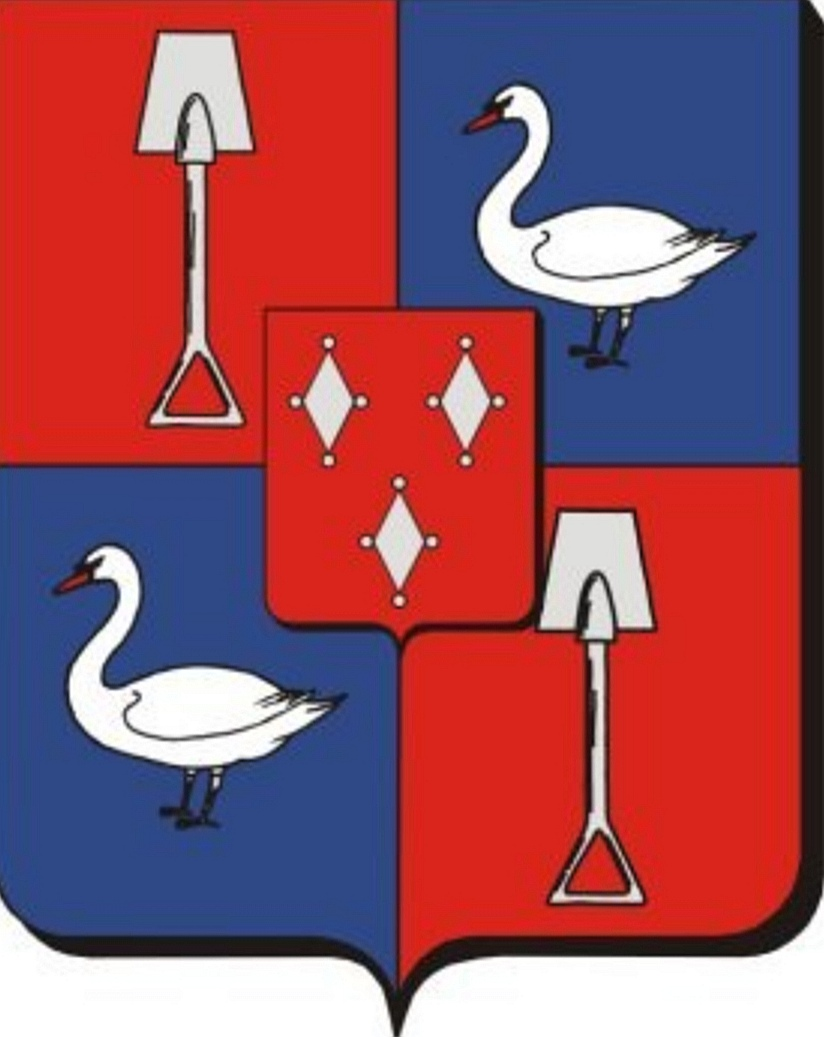
Personal coat of arms as Free Lord of Zuid-Polsbroek (1664 creation)

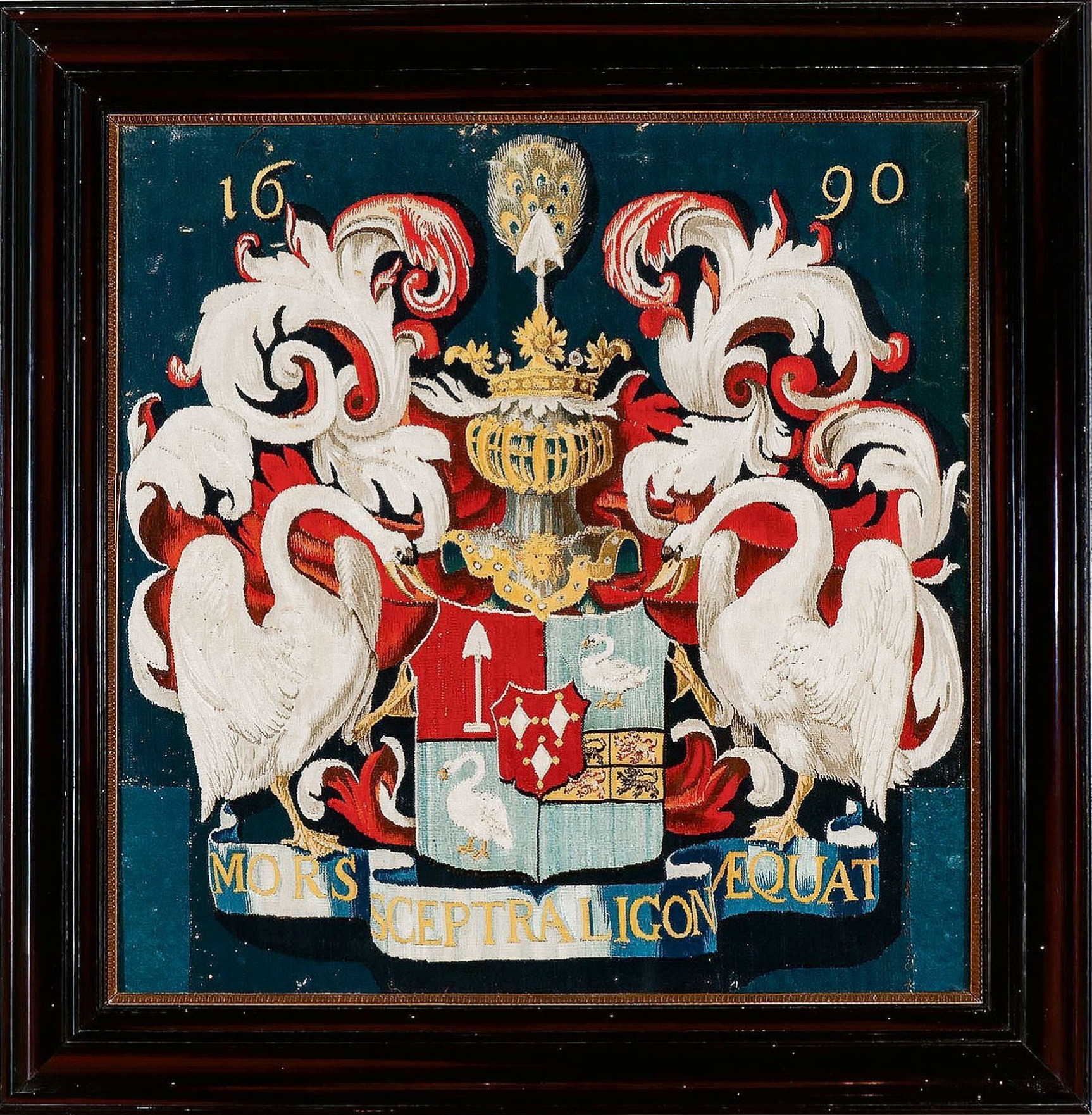
Personal coat of arms as Free Lord of Zuid-Polsbroek, Purmerland and Ilpendam (1690 creation)

==== Ancient coat of arms ====
Pieter de Graeff's coat of arms of origin was quartered and showed the following symbols:

- field 1 (left above) the silver shovel on a red background of their paternal ancestors, the Herren von Graben
- field 2 (right above) it shows a silver falcon on a blue background. The origin of the falcon lies in the possession of the Valckeveen estate (later the Valckenburg estate) in Gooiland
- field 3 (left below), same as field 2
- field 4 (right below), same as field 1
- helmet covers in red and silver
- helm adornment shows an upright silver spade with ostrich feathers (Herren von Graben)
- motto: MORS SCEPTRA LIGONIBUS AEQUAT (DEATH MAKES SEPTRES AND HOES EQUAL)

==== 1664 creation ====
The personal coat of arms of Pieter de Graeff of 1664 is quarterd with a heart shield and shows the following symbols:

- heart shield shows the three silver rhombuses on red (originally from the family Van Woerdern van Vliet) of the High Lordship Zuid-Polsbroek
- field 1 (left above) shows the silver shovel on red of their paternal ancestors, the Herren von Graben
- field 2 (right above) shows the silver swan on blue of the Fief Vredenhof [or that one (Waterland) of their maternal ancestors, the De Grebber family
- field 3 (left below), same as field 2
- field 4 (right below), same as field 1
- helmet covers in red and silver
- helm adornment shows an upright silver spade with ostrich feathers (Herren von Graben)
- motto: MORS SCEPTRA LIGONIBUS AEQUAT (DEATH MAKES SEPTRES AND HOES EQUAL)

==== 1690 creation ====
The personal coat of arms of Pieter de Graeff is quartered with a heart shield and since 1690 it shows the following symbols:

- heart shield shows the three silver rhombuses on red (originally from the family Van Woerdern van Vliet) of the High Lordship Zuid-Polsbroek
- field 1 (left above) shows the silver shovel on red of their paternal ancestors, the Herren von Graben
- field 2 (right above) shows the silver swan on blue of the Fief Vredenhof [or that one (Waterland) of their maternal ancestors, the De Grebber family
- field 3 (left below) shows the silver goose in blue of Purmerland (High Lordship Purmerland and Ilpendam)
- field 4 (right below) shows the red and black lions on gold (the arms of the County of Holland) for Ilpendam (High Lordship Purmerland and Ilpendam) above a blue area
- shield holders are two silver swans
- helmet covers in red and silver
- helm adornment shows an upright silver spade with ostrich feathers (Herren von Graben)
- motto: MORS SCEPTRA LIGONIBUS AEQUAT (DEATH MAKES SEPTRES AND HOES EQUAL)

=== Early years, marriage and offspring ===
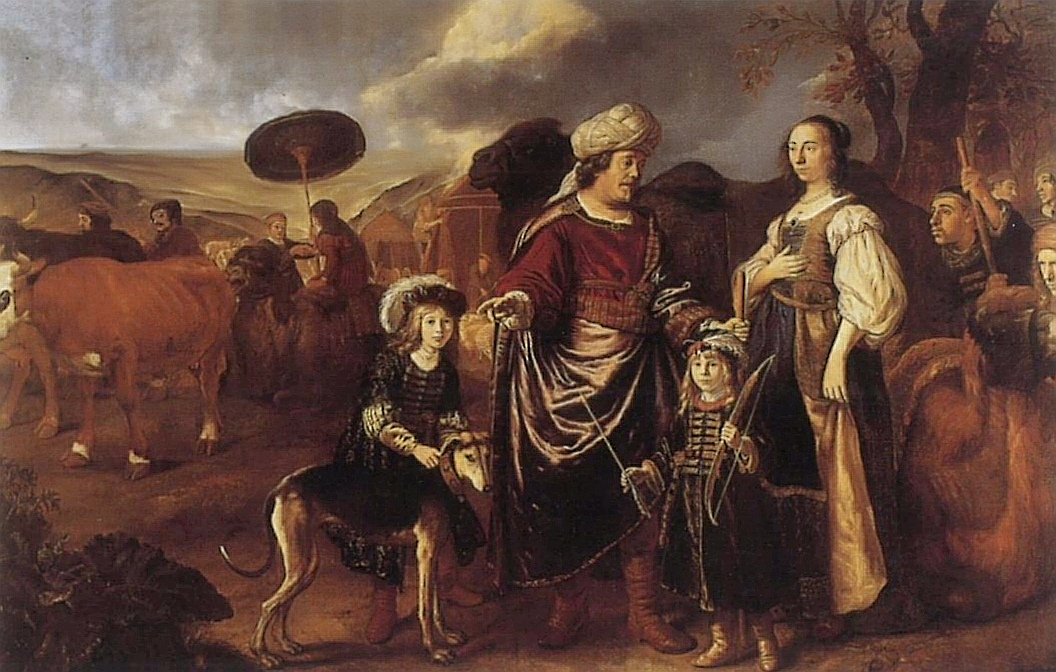
Allegory of Cornelis de Graeff as leader of his people: Cornelis de Graeff as Isaac with his wife Catharina Hooft as Rebecca with their sons Pieter and Jakob as Jacob and Esau, painted by Jan Victors (1652)

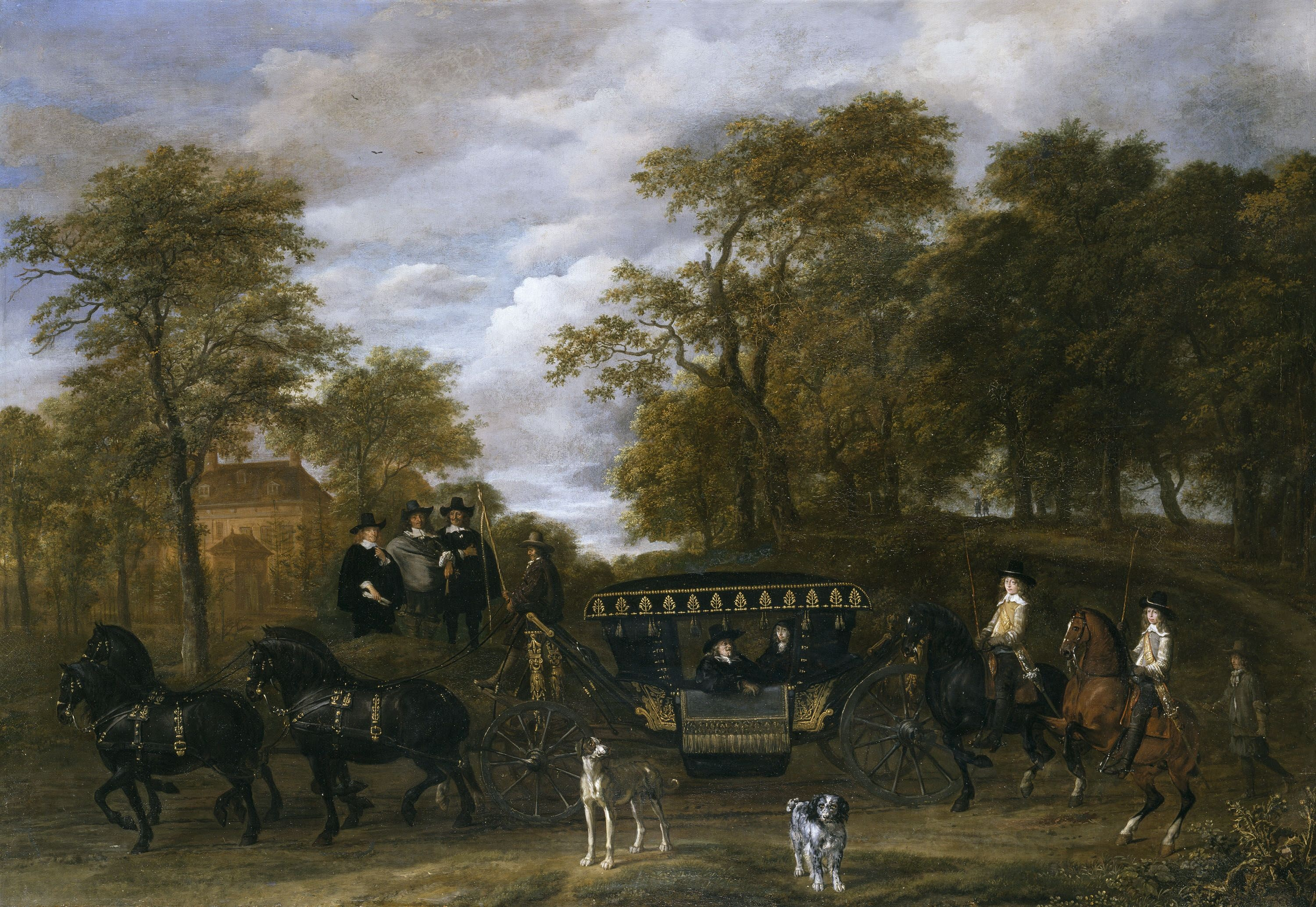
The 9 of Cornelis de Graeff and Members of His Family at Soestdijk, His Country Estate, by Jacob van Ruisdael and Thomas de Keyser, (1656/1660), National Gallery of Ireland

In his youth, Pieter enjoyed education and private tuition from Johann Amos who, who provided him with an important educational basis. In 1652 his father Cornelis de Graeff had his wife Catharina and their two sons Pieter and Jacob portrayed by Jan Victors as Isaac and Rebecca with their sons Jacob and Esau. This allegorical work and De Graeff's portrayal as one of the patriarchs of a people and his wife and children should underscore its importance. In 1655, De Graeff went together with Joan Huydecoper van Maarsseveen and his eldest son Joan on a diplomatic mission to Prince-elector Frederick William of Brandenburg, to look for support against the war with Sweden.

During the summers the family spent a lot of their time at the Palace Soestdijk, and in 1660 the brothers Pieter and Jacob played with the young William III of Orange, later King of England, Scotland and Ireland and stadtholder of the United Provinces of the Netherlands, at the lake and woods at Soestdijk.

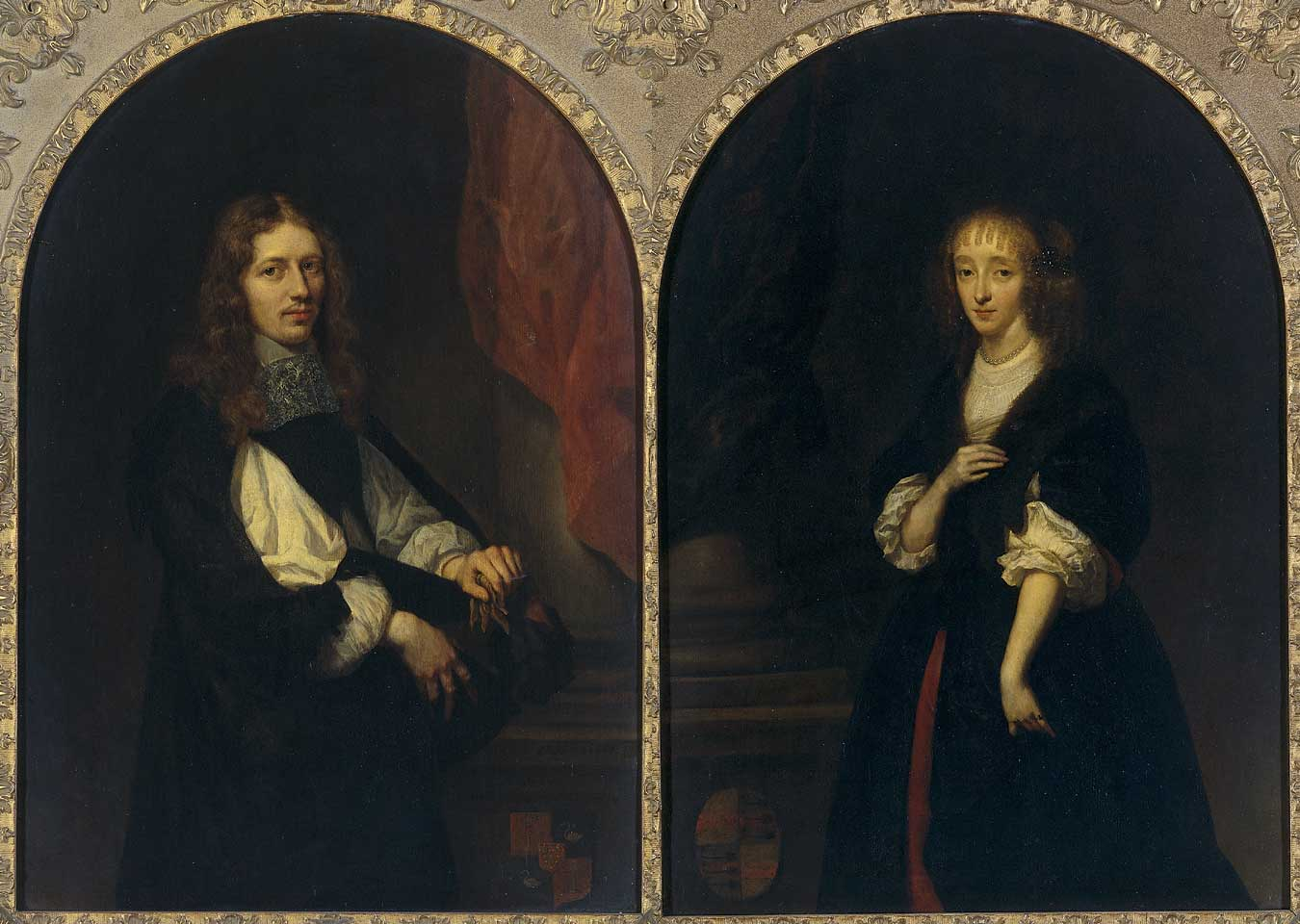
Portraits of Pieter de Graeff and Jacoba Bicker, painted in 1663 by Caspar Netscher, Rijksmuseum Amsterdam

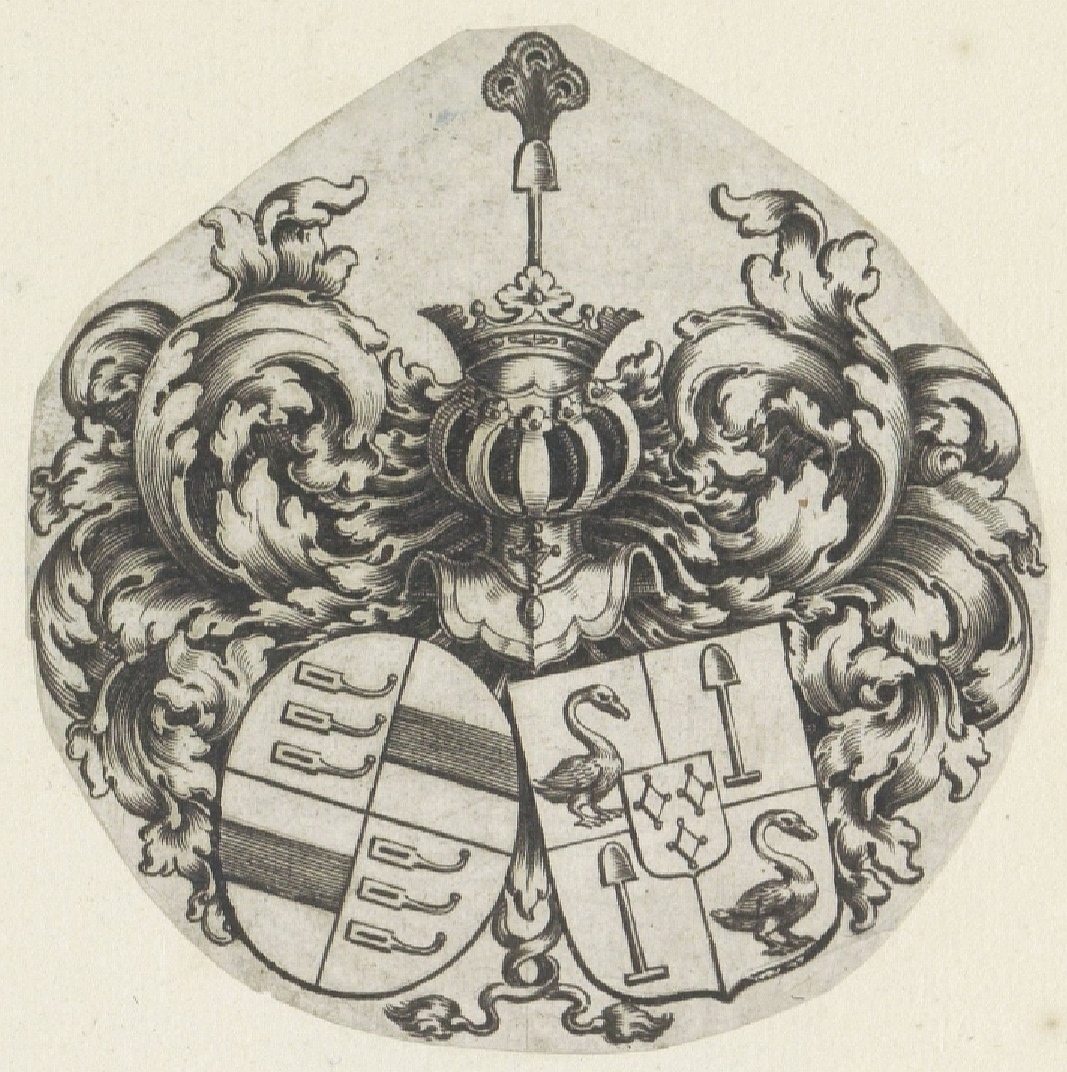
Marriage crest of Pieter de Graeff and Jacoba Bicker

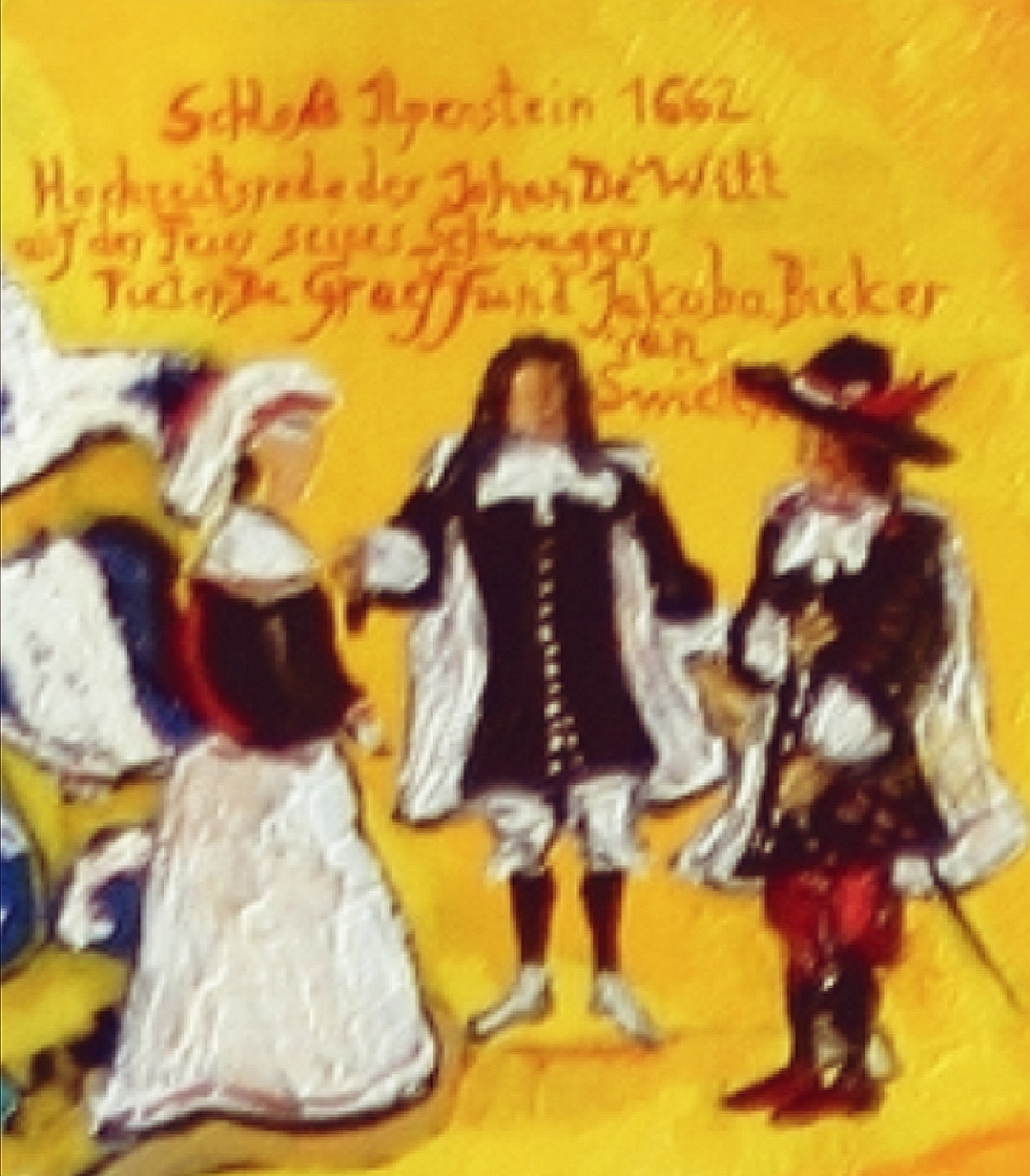
Wedding scene with the speech of Johan de Witt (detail of a historical painting by Matthias Laurenz Gräff, 2007)

After De Graeff did a Grand Tour through France and England, he married his niece Jacoba Bicker, sister of Wendela Bicker, who married Grand pensionary Johan de Witt. The protagonists of the patriciate were closely related, and the couple Pieter and Jacoba were also cousins of the brothers Johan and Cornelis de Witt. Pieter's brothers-in-law also included high official Gerard Bicker (I) van Swieten, arms dealer Jacob Trip and banker and financier Jean Deutz, all important and loyal political allies of Grand pensionary De Witt. At their wedding at Ilpenstein Castle, De Witt gave the wedding speech. The poets Gerard Brandt, Jan Vos and Joost van den Vondel, who were present "sang about" this wedding. The couple had three children:

- Agneta de Graeff (1663–1725), married Jan Baptiste de Hochepied II (1669–1709), deputy to the General Accounting Chamberlain. She owned the cityhouse "Korte Vijverberg 3" in The Hague, the current cabinet of the king and at her death she had a fortune of 867,000 guilders, of which she left 525,000 guilders to her cousin Gerard Bicker (II) van Swieten. Jan Baptiste was an uncle of Elbert de Hochepied, 2nd Baron de Hochepied, Dutch politician and diplomat
- Cornelis de Graeff (1671–1719), Free Lord of Purmerland and Ilpendam, canon in the cathedral chapter of St. Pieter in Utrecht
- Johan de Graeff (1673–1714), Free Lord of Zuid-Polsbroek, Amsterdam regent

=== Career ===
==== Before the Rampjaar ====
In 1662, Pieter de Graeff became a member of the vroedschap of the City of Amsterdam. In 1664, after the death of his father Cornelis, he succeeded him as free lord of Zuid-Polsbroek and became a chief administrator of the Dutch East Indies Company (VOC). He was very interested in agriculture, which he was able to follow eagerly as wind lifter of the VOC and as landlord. During the 1660s De Graeff became one of the guardians of prince William III of Orange.

De Graeff was also an advisor and a close friend to his brother-in-law Grand Pensionary Johan de Witt. The relationship between the two is described as very good and intimate. The two shared an intensive correspondence. Some letters between the two deal with the upbringing of the young William of Orange, the child of state. When De Graeff's sister-in-law and cousin Wendela Bicker died in 1668, he and his brother-in-law Jean Deutz were appointed guardians of their nephews and nieces and were responsible for handling the estate. In the early 1670s, under the influence of the orangist burgomasters Gillis Valckenier and Coenraad van Beuningen, an anti-De Witt faction crystallized in the Amsterdam city government. During the course of 1671, the Republican State Party, led by Pieter de Graeff, regained the upper hand in the Amsterdam city government. For a brief time it looked as if De Witt's republican system might be consolidated.

==== Rampjaar and afterwards ====
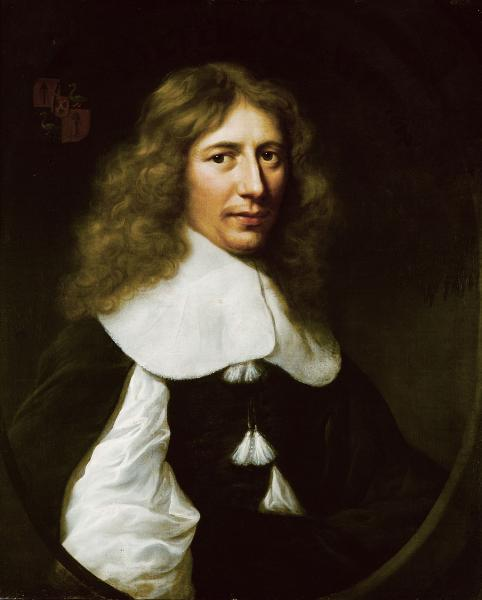
Pieter de Graeff, painted by Wallerant Vaillant (1674)

In the Rampjaar 1672, Louis XIV of France conquered large areas of the Dutch Republic. In order to protect the province of Holland, the States General had the dikes pierced and the sluices opened, flooding parts of the country. Although this stopped the advance of France, large areas of the country were devastated, which the population generally blamed on Johan de Witt. After the unsuccessful assassination attempt on De Witt on June 21 by Jacob van der Graeff, he was convalescent for a long time. During this time, Pieter de Graeff had two of his children with him. In a letter to De Witt, he emphasizes that there is no hurry, as he finds the children's company very pleasant. Since De Witt no longer saw any political prospects for himself after William of Orange was appointed stadholder of Holland, he resigned on August 4 as Grand Pensionary of Holland and West Friesland. At the beginning of September, the republican and Wittian (Johan de Witt) faction De Graeff, including Pieter, his brother Jacob, their uncles old-burgomaster Andries de Graeff and burgomaster Lambert Reynst, was expelled from the Amsterdam government. With the raise of the House of Orange and Gillis Valckenier at Amsterdam, the De Graeff family had no longer the chance to keep their power through Amsterdam and Holland. On August 20, the brothers Johan and Cornelis de Witt were murdered in the most horrible manner in The Hague by a crowd of Orange-minded people. After De Witts death he became the guardian over his five children, including Johan de Witt Jr. Here De Graeff benefited from his upbringing and pedagogical knowledge, which he received from Comenius in his youth. His diary entries show that they were well taken care of.

De Graeff remained only the function of a president-bewindhebber of the VOC, which he held until his death. Between the years 1671 and 1678 De Graeff, who increasingly emerged as one of the leaders of the VOC, worked closely with Joan Maetsuycker, the governor-general of the Dutch East Indies. Especially in the years 1673/74 the brothers Pieter and Jacob tried unsuccessfully with stadholder Willem III to come into favor. The brothers no longer enjoyed the favor of Willem, and both remained without office for the rest of their lives.

In 1674, De Graeff had active cash assets of 130,000 guilders, making him one of the 250 richest people of the Dutch Golden Age. In 1678 he inherited his aunt Maria Overlander van Purmerland, widow of Amsterdam burgomaster Frans Banning Cocq, who had a fortune of 200,000 guilders in 1674. This inheritance came from members of the Overlander, Hooft and Banninck Cocq families, from whom he also inherited the other assets. After the death of his brother and mother in 1691 he became lord of the high Lordship of Purmerland and Ilpendam. The historian Kees Zandvliet estimates De Graeff's fortune based on this and other inheritances at the end of the 17th century at at least 1 million guilders.

Pieter de Graeff died in 1707 as a widower, after his wife Jacoba Bicker has died in 1695. He was buried in the family vault in the Oude Kerk at Amsterdam.

=== Art and lifestyle ===
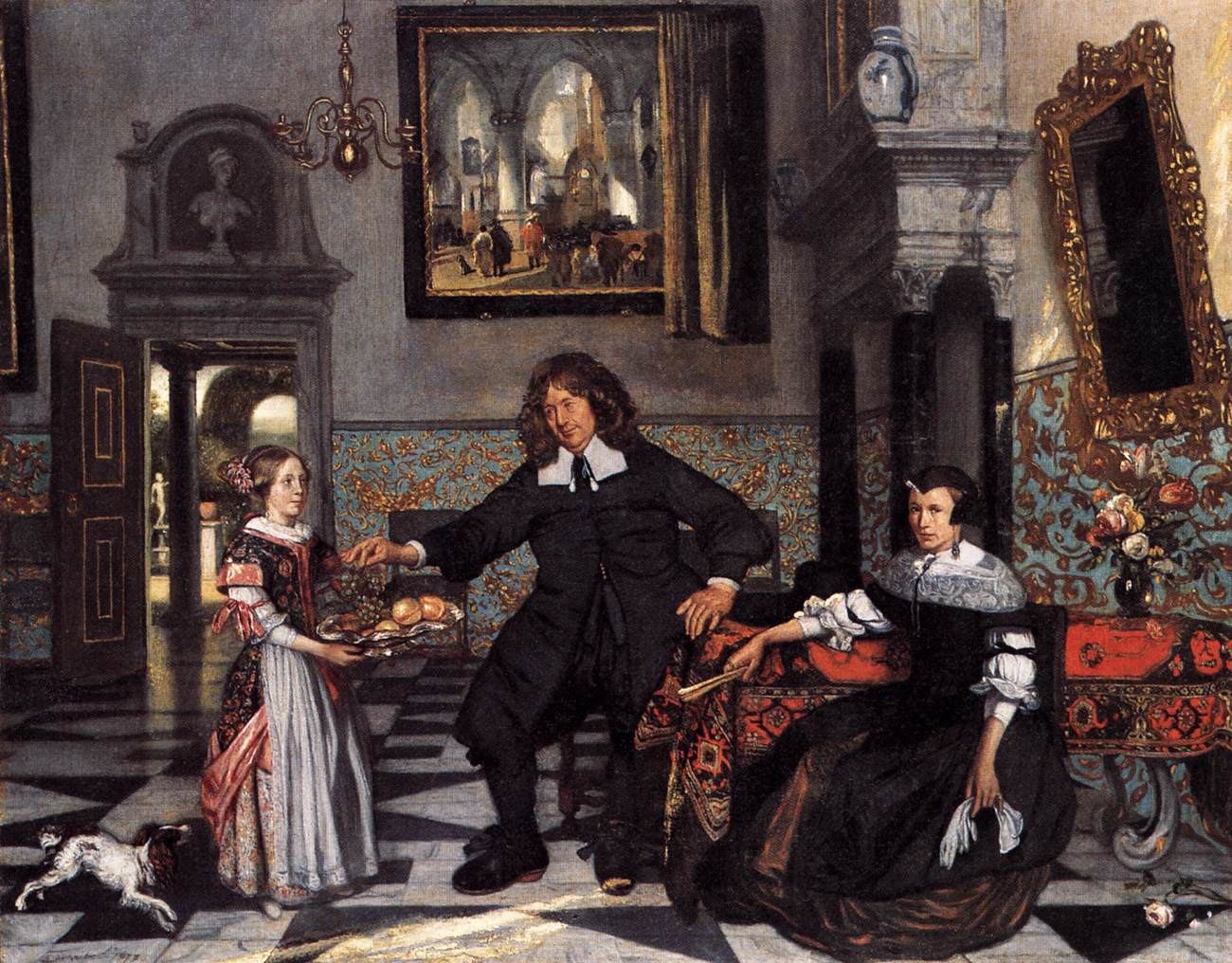
Portrait of the family of Pieter de Graeff (the other persons are his wife Jacoba and his daughter Agneta) by Emanuel de Witte, 1678

Like his father Cornelis and his uncle Andries, Pieter de Graeff was also a man who surrounded himself with art and beauty. His estate contains several paintings depicting him at different stages of his life. He was painted by Gerard ter Borch, Jan Lievens Caspar Netscher and Wallerant Vaillant, Govert Flinck and like his brother Jacob by Karel Dujardin There are also three group portraits with his parents and close relatives. The first dates from 1652 and was painted by Jan Victors. It shows them as the biblical characters Archfather Isaac and Rebecca and their children Esau and Jacob. The second one, The Arrival of Cornelis de Graeff and Members of His Family at Soestdijk, His Country Estate by Jacob van Ruisdael and Thomas de Keyser shows him and his brother Jacob on their horses driving up with his parents and his uncles Willem Schrijver, Pieter Trip and Andries de Graeff in front of his father's country estate Soestdijk. In 1678, De Graeff was immortalized with his wife Jacoba Bicker and their daughter Agneta de Graeff by Emanuel de Witte in the painting Portrait of a Family in an Interior. C. W. Fock of the University of Leiden describes in her work – Het stempel van de bewoner – Pieter de Graeffs patronage, art-collection and lifestyle. In 2007, Austrian artist Matthias Laurenz Gräff, a distant descendant of De Graeff, used Netscher's painting of Pieter in his painting "Ahnenfolge" (Ancestral Succession/Ancestry) as part of his diploma series.

He stand also in close correspondence to his brother-in-law Grand Pensionary Johan de Witt, ambassador Jacob Boreel, poet Joost van den Vondel, painter Jan Lievens, mathematician, astronomer and physicist Christiaan Huygens as well as to polymath Gottfried Wilhelm Leibniz

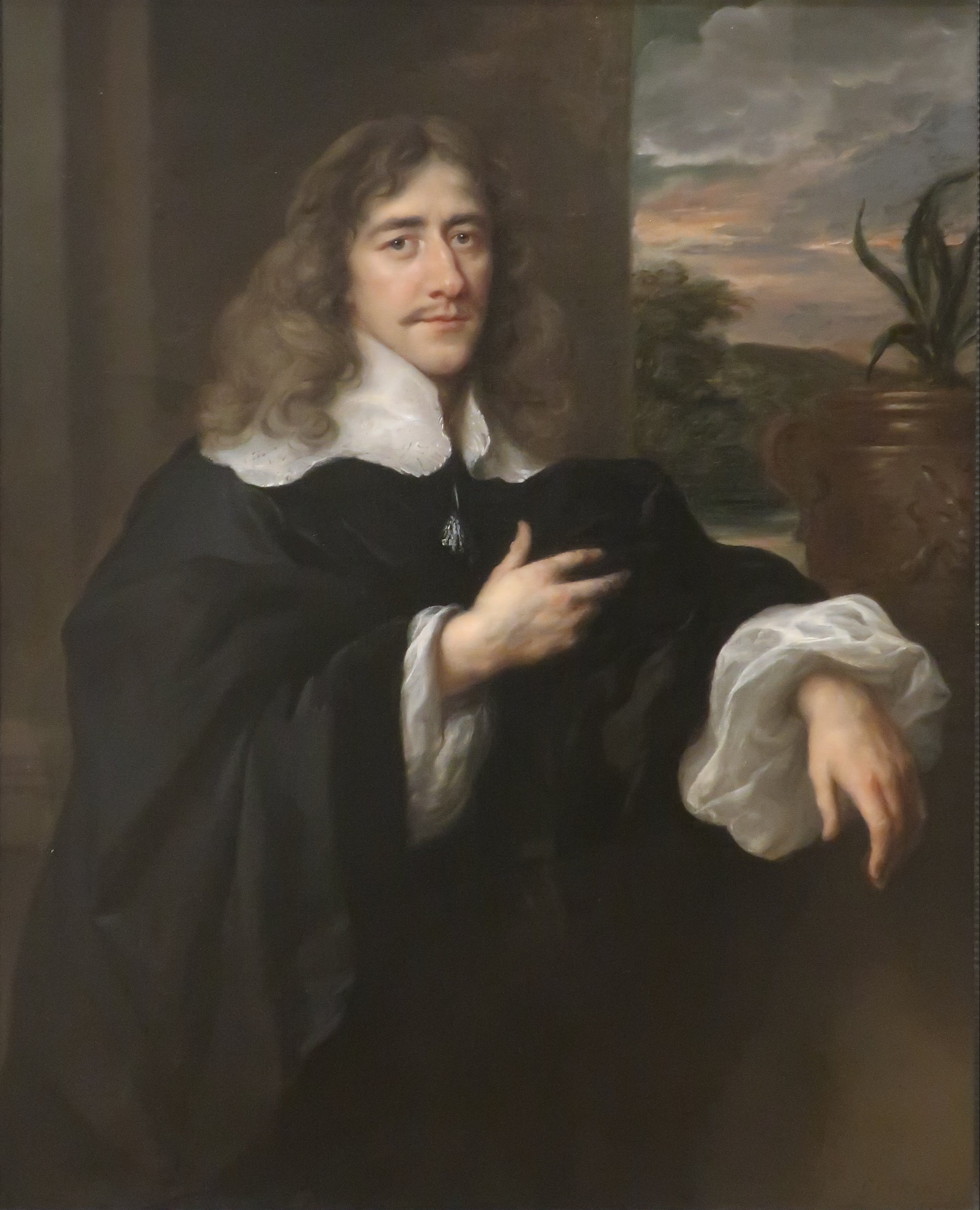
Pieter de Graeff painted by Govert Flinck

Pieter de Graeff lived in the cityhouse at Amsterdam's Herengracht No. 573, today's Tassenmuseum Hendrikje, the country estates Valkenburg, Vogelsang and Bronstee, and Ilpenstein Castle. Valkenburg (the former estate Valckeveen of his grandfather Dirck Jansz Graeff) near Heemstede, acquired Pieter, his uncle Andries de Graeff and his cousin and brother-in-law Gerard Bicker (I) van Swieten in 1675 in equal shares from his aunt Christina de Graeff (1609–1679). From 1685 Pieter was the sole owner. In his diaries he made several notes on negotiations and payments from his possessions. He encountered some problems with the famous graphical artist Romeyn de Hooghe, who was going to draw an artistic map of Valkenburg. Besides he had some maps coloured by the artist David Reerigh, who also coloured several maps of the Hoogheemraadschap of Rijnland of 1687.

==== Library ====
Pieter de Graeff's library in his Amsterdam town house at 573 Herengracht, later the Tassenmuseum Hendrikje, comprised more than 2,300 books in various languages and on a wide variety of subjects, forming a microcosm of 17th-century knowledge. He owned works in the legal and theological fields, but he was also interested in historical events and geopolitical subjects. Also, there are various descriptions of distant places, travel guides, manuals for learning foreign languages, and dictionaries. He owned medical books and manuscripts, including a handwritten prescription by Danish astronomer Tycho Brahe. He had writings on chemistry, mathematics, politics, personal notes by his uncle burgomaster Andries Bicker and basic papers, particularly on the De Dolphijn house, formerly owned by his great-uncle burgomaster Volkert Overlander and later by his son-in-law, and De Graeff's uncle, burgomaster Frans Banninck Cocq. De Graeff also collected medals and coins and also owned books about coins and medals. But that was only a fraction of his entire book collection. Thanks to a list of estates drawn up after his death in 1707, it is possible to get an idea of his possessions and collections. An auction catalog that appeared after the turn of the millennium also ensures that his library can be reconstructed in Detail.

==== Diaries ====
Pieter de Graeff kept an intense diary for most of his life. Between the years 1664 and 1706 he had written diaries of approximately 1600 pages.

==== Genealogical activity ====
Pieter de Graeff was an excessive genealogist, collector of family papers and chronicler of writings and documents of his family throughout his life. Through him, many genealogical facts and information about his gender are still archived today. The De Graeff family archive in Amsterdam contained many of these pieces as late as 1912. He archived his uncle Amsterdam burgomaster and statesman Andries Bicker's personal notes and basic papers, as well as particularly notes about the De Dolphijn house, formerly owned by his great-uncle burgomaster Volkert Overlander and later by his son-in-law and De Graeff's uncle burgomaster Frans Banninck Cocq. He also compiled the (older) genealogy of the imperial barons De Petersen, to whom he was related as a grand cousin of Count Palatine Jacob de Petersen.

===== The family album of Frans Banninck Cocq =====
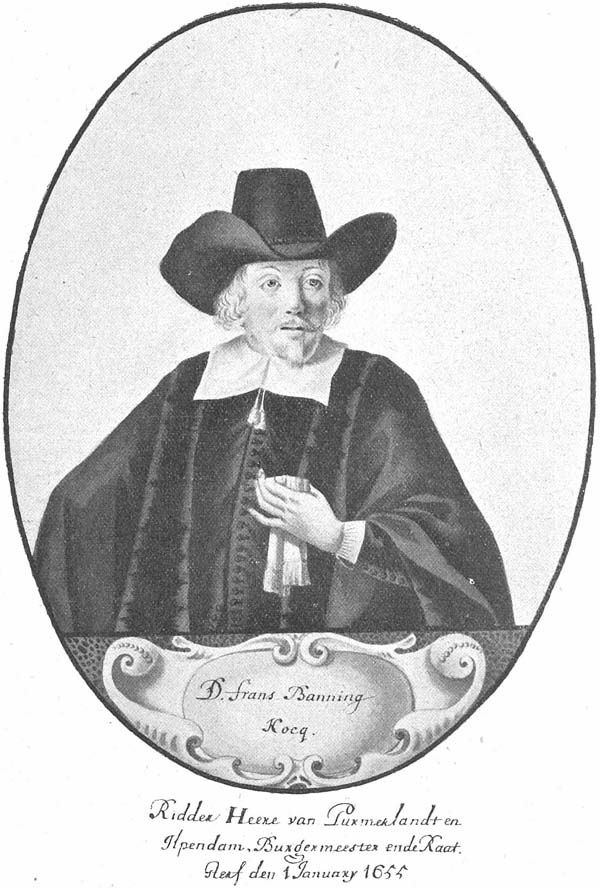
Portrait of Frans Banninck Cocq, captioned Dr. Frans Banning Cocq probably comes from Pieter de Graeff

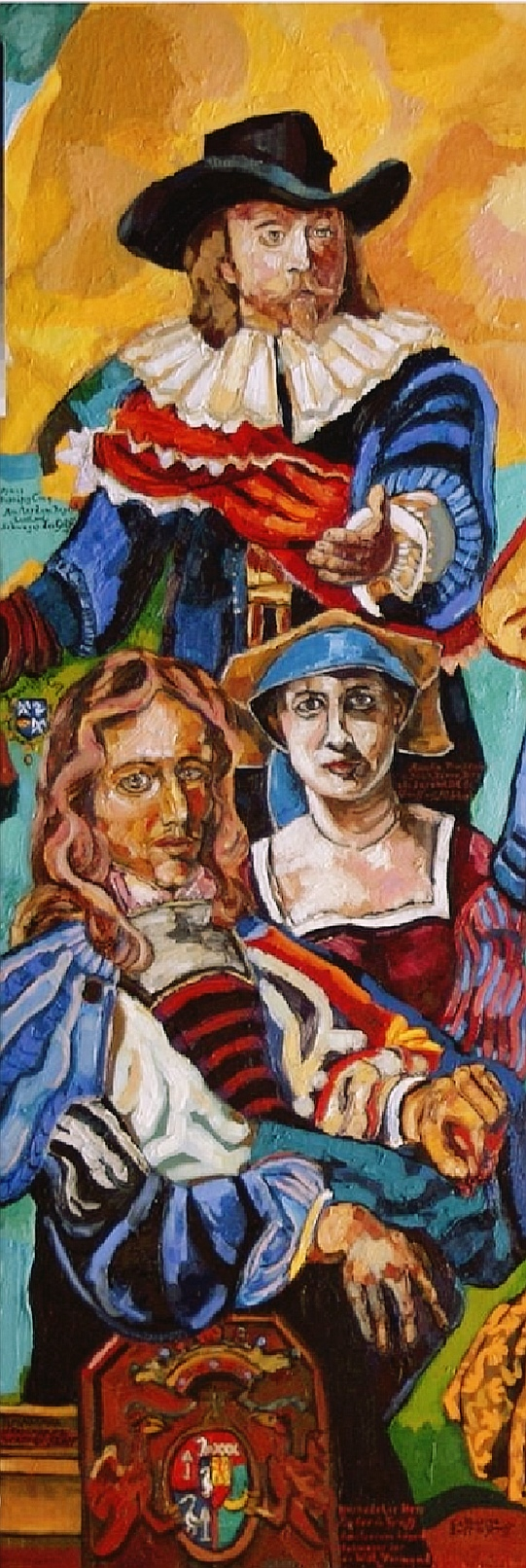
Frans Banning Cocq (back) with his nephew and heir Pieter de Graeff (front). Detail from the painting "Ahnenfolge" (Ancestral Succession/Ancestry) by Matthias Laurenz Gräff (diploma thesis "Weltaußenschau-Weltinnenschau", 2007)

In the Amsterdam patriciate of the 16th and 17th centuries, there were two families with very similar names, the Banning(h) family, also known as Benning(h), and the Banninck family, which were not closely related to each other. The first-named family was of greater importance, since they were members of the city government for a longer period of time. Frans Banninck Cocq, the captain in Rembrandt's famous painting The Night Watch and Pieter de Graeff's uncle and testator, belonged to the less important Banninck family via his mother's side. Due to the similar names, there were already misspellings among contemporaries. A two-part family album created by Banninck Cocq contains numerous colored drawings and watercolors in addition to a copy of The Night Watch. It shows the genealogy of his family, with illustrations of a number of coats of arms. Numerous buildings are also shown to which Banninck Cocq had a relationship. Many of the illustrations were probably painted by himself, and the book was completed by himself around 1654. The Night Watch was probably painted by Jacob Colijns on behalf of Banninck Cocq. A number of handwritten additions were made by De Graeff after Banninck Cocq's death in 1655. It is possible that other drawings and watercolors in the family book were also added by Colijns after Banninck Cocq's death, who also forged or falsified documents on other families related to him in De Graeff's favor.

For a long time it was assumed that Banninck Cocq himself had manipulated the family albums in such a way that they proved his origin from the older patrician family. In fact, the forgeries were made in the handwriting of De Graeff, who had lost all municipal offices after the Rampjaar in 1672 and therefore also had reason and opportunity to improve his family history. The painter Colijns, who may have also painted the copy of the Night Watch in the family album, and the poet Joost van den Vondel also assisted him in manipulating this family history. The Dutch historian Johan Engelbert Elias published his two-volume history of the Amsterdam city government De vroedschap van Amsterdam, 1578–1795 between 1903 and 1905. Elias did not see through De Graeff's forgeries and combined both families into one, but this could be refuted in the 21st century by new research and the completely different family crests. The family book is still owned by the De Graeff family and is on permanent loan in the Rijksprentenkabinet of the Rijksmuseum Amsterdam.

== Titles ==
Pieter de Graeff House De Graeff Born: 15 August 1638 Died: 3 June 1707
Regnal titles
Preceded by Cornelis de Graeff	Free Lord of Zuid-Polsbroek; 1664–1707	Succeeded by Johan de Graeff
Preceded by Catharina Hooft and Jacob de Graeff	19.th Free Lord of Purmerland and Ilpendam; 1691–1707	Succeeded by Cornelis de Graeff II.

== Literature ==
- Zandvliet, Kees (2006) De 250 rijksten van de Gouden Eeuw: kapitaal, macht, familie en levensstijl blz. 93 t/m 94, uitg. Nieuw Amsterdam, Amsterdam, ISBN 90-8689-006-7
- Burke, P. (1994) Venice and Amsterdam. A study of seventeenth-century élites.
- Graeff, P. De (P. de Graeff Gerritsz en Dirk de Graeff van Polsbroek) Genealogie van de familie De Graeff van Polsbroek Amsterdam 1882, Antiquariaat A.G. van der Steur
- Bruijn, J. H. De Genealogie van het geslacht De Graeff van Polsbroek 1529/1827 Antiquariaat A.G. van der Steur
- Moelker, H.P. De heerlijkheid Purmerland en Ilpendam (1978 Purmerend)
