= De Graeff family tree =

Genealogy of the De Graeff family

This is family tree of the Dutch De Graeff family (Dutch pronunciation: [də ˈɣraːf]), an alleged cadet branch of the House Von Graben that descended from the Austrian noble Wolfgang von Graben († 1521).

== Dutch family tree ==
- Wolfgang von Graben († 1521)
  - Peter von Graben aka Pieter Graeff (born around 1450/1460)
    - Jan Pietersz Graeff (before 1500–1553)
      - Pieter Jansz Graeff (died around 1547)
        - Cornelis Pietersz Graeff
      - Lenaert Jansz de Graeff (around 1525/30–before 1578)
        - Steyntje Leonardsdr de Graeff
        - Pieter Leonardsz de Graeff (named 1590) → Descendants
        - Jannetje Leonardsdr de Graeff (1554–1619)
        - Jan Leonhardsz de Graeff
        - Dirk Reynier de Graeff (named 1596) (?)
          - Reynier de Graaff (named 1641)
            - Reynardus de Graaff (named 1670)
              - Reynier de Graaff (named 1710)
                - Reynardus de Graaff (named 1745)
                  - Reynbert Gerhard de Graaff (named 1782)
                    - Reinardus Joostinus Marinus de Graaff (* 1829)
                      - Gérard Hendrik Reinardus de Graaff (1853–1917) → Descendants (?)
                      - Henri (Heinrich) de Graaff (1857–1924) → Descendants (?)
                      - Emile de Graaff
      - Weyntje Dircksz (de) Graeff
      - Diederik Jansz. Graeff (1532–1589)
        - Jan Dircksz Graeff (died 1627)
        - Jacob Dircksz de Graeff (1571–1638)
          - Cornelis de Graeff (1599–1664)
            - Pieter de Graeff (1638–1707)
              - Agneta de Graeff (1663–1725)
              - Cornelis de Graeff (1671–1719)
              - Johan de Graeff (1673–1714)
                - Jacoba Adriana de Graeff (1710–1745)
                - Gerrit de Graeff (1711–1752)
                  - Joan de Graeff (1735-1754)
                  - Geertruid Joanna de Graeff (1740–1801)
                  - Gerrit de Graeff (II) van Zuid-Polsbroek (1741–1811)
                    - Gerrit de Graeff (III) van Zuid-Polsbroek (1766–1814)
                      - Christina Elisabeth de Graeff (born 1795)
                      - Gerrit de Graeff (IV) van Zuid-Polsbroek (1797–1870)
                        - Gerrit Arnold Theodoor de Graeff (1831–1889)
                          - Carolina Agnes Maria de Graeff van Polsbroek (born 1855)
                          - Gerrit de Graeff (V) van Polsbroek (born 1856)
                          - Henry George de Graeff van Polsbroek (1858–1941)
                            - Augusta Eustace de Graeff van Polsbroek
                            - Geraldine de Graeff van Polsbroek
                            - Theodore Lawrence Henry de Graeff van Polsbroek → Descendants
                          - Agnes Margaretha de Gaeff van Polsbroek (1859–1935)
                          - Joseph de Graeff van Polsbroek (born 1862) → Descendants
                        - Carolina Frederica Christina de Graeff (1832–1885)
                        - Dirk de Graeff van Polsbroek (1833–1916)
                          - Pieter de Graeff (1861–1909) → Descendants
                          - Anna Carolina de Graeff (born 1871)
                          - Andries Cornelis Dirk de Graeff (1872–1957)
                            - Bonne Elisabeth Constance Wilhelmine de Graeff (1898–1987)
                            - Anne Maria de Graeff (born 1904)
                            - Jacob de Graeff (born 1921)
                              - Jan Jaap de Graeff (born 1949) → Descendants
                          - Géorg de Graeff (1873–1954)
                            - Dirk Georg de Graeff (1905–1986) → Descendants
                            - Herman Jacob de Graeff (1907–1978)
                              - Pieter Georg de Graeff (born 1934)
                              - Egbert Cornelis Christian de Graeff (1936–2017) → Descendants
                              - Martha Kinnema Wilhelmina de Graeff (born 1938)
                              - Christine Henriette de Graeff (born 1942)
                            - Andries Cornelis Dirk de Graeff (1909–1981) → Descendants
                          - Jacob de Graeff (1875–1963) → Descendants
                          - Carolina Frederika Christina de Graeff (born 1877)
                          - Cornelis de Graeff (1881–1956) → Descendants
                        - Christina Jacoba de Graeff (1836-1842)
                        - Frederik Lodewijk de Graeff (1837-1918)
                          - Johanna Carolina Frederika de Graeff (born 1868)
                          - Emilie Maria Henriette de Graeff (born 1872)
                        - Gijsbert Carel Rutger Reinier de Graeff (1838-1923)
                          - Willem Carel Dirk de Graeff (1868–1886) → Descendants
                          - Frederika Maria Cornelia de Graeff (born 1870)
                          - Carolina Albertina Azora Cosmopolita de Graeff (born 1872)
                          - Gijsbert Carel Rutger Reinier van Brienen van Ramerus de Graeff (born 1876) → Descendants
                      - Anna Margaretha de Graeff (1798–1824)
                      - Cornelia Maria de Graeff (1800–1876)
                    - Geertruid Elisabeth de Graeff (1776–1857)
                  - Elisabeth Jacoba de Graeff (1751–1802)
                - Alida Johanna de Graeff (1713–1757)
              - Agneta de Graeff
            - Jacob de Graeff (1642–1690)
          - Dirk de Graeff (1601–1637)
          - Agneta de Graeff van Polsbroek (1603–1656)
          - Hendrik de Graeff (born 1605)
          - Wendela de Graeff (1607–1652)
          - Christina de Graeff (1609–1679)
          - Andries de Graeff (1611–1678)
            - Cornelis de Graeff (1650–1678)
            - Alida de Graeff (1651–1738)
            - Arnoldina de Graeff (1652–1703)
        - Pieter Dircksz Graeff (1573–1645)
        - Cornelis Dircksz Graeff, alias van Rijn
          - Jan Cornelisz (de) Graef(f)
            - Neeltgen Jans Vercroft (not Graeff)
      - Cornelis Pieter Jansz Graeff
    - Jacob Jansz Graeff (died around 1580)
      - Styntje Jacobsdr Graeff
      - Jan Jacobsz Graeff (born around 1570/75)
        - Claes Jansz Graeff
          - Albert Claesz de Graeff (born around 1620)
        - Adriana Jansdr Graeff (died after 1640)
        - Maria Jansdr Graeff
        - Cornelis Jansz Graeff
          - Catharina Cornelisdr Graeff
          - Pieter Cornelisz Graeff (died 1679) → Descendants
          - Jan Cornelisz (de) Graeff
            - Cornelis Jansz de Graeff
              - Catharina Cornelisdr de Graeff
              - Pieter Cornelisz de Graeff (died 1693) → Descendants
              - Jan Cornelisz de Graeff
                - Cornelis Jansz de Graeff
                - Jacob Jansz de Graeff → Descendants
                - Cornelis Jansz de Graeff
                - Jan Jansz de Graeff
                - Cornelis Jansz de Graeff
                - Maria Jansdr de Graeff
                - Alida Jansdr de Graeff
                - Cornelis Jansz de Graeff
                - Alida Jansdr de Graeff
                - Hendrica Jansdr de Graeff
                - Pieter Jansz de Graeff
                  - Jan de Graeff (died 1751) (alleged) → unknown Descendants
                  - Pieter de Graeff (died 1760) (alleged) → unknown Descendants
                - Jan Jansz de Graeff
              - Apollonia Cornelisdr de Graeff
            - Jacob Jansz de Graeff
            - Cornelis Jansz de Graeff
            - Pieter Jansz de Graeff
              - Pieter de Graeff
                - Joannis de Graeff
            - Jan Jansz de Graeff
      - Claes Jacobsz Graeff
      - Adriaan Jacobsz Graeff (extramarital) → Descendants [includes Helmuth Gräff (* 1958), Austrian artist and Matthias Laurenz Gräff (* 1984), Austrian artist and politician]

== See also ==
- De Graeff
- Free and high fief of Zuid-Polsbroek
- Free and high fief of Purmerland and Ilpendam
