= Invasion of the Netherlands =

There have been multiple military invasions of the Netherlands or its predecessor states, including:

- The Capture of Brielle by the Watergeuzen (1572), during the Dutch Revolt
- The Franco-Dutch War (1672–78), during which France and Munster occupied much of the Netherlands
- Prussian invasion of Holland (1787), during the Batavian Revolution
- The culmination of the Flanders Campaign (1792–95), invasion by France during the War of the First Coalition
- Anglo-Russian invasion of Holland (1799), during the War of the Second Coalition
- Walcheren Campaign (1809), during the War of the Fifth Coalition
- German invasion of the Netherlands (1940), during the Second World War
