= De Graeff =

Dutch patrician and noble family

De Graeff Graef, Graeff, De Graaff, De Graaf, De Graeff van Polsbroek
- Noble family
- Coat of arms of De Graeff family
- Parent house: Herren von Graben
- Country: Netherlands, Germany, South Africa
- Founded: ~1484
- Founder: Pieter Graeff
- Titles: knights, jonkheers
- Styles: vrijheer (Free Lord) of Zuid-Polsbroek, Purmerland and Ilpendam
- Estates: Ilpenstein castle, Soestdijk Palace

De Graeff (Dutch pronunciation: [də ˈɣraːf]; also: De Graef, Graef, Graeff, Graaff, Graaf and De Graeff van Polsbroek) is a Dutch noble family.

The family divided into different lines, in Holland, Prussia (Germany) and South Africa including the patrician-aristocratic line of regents at Amsterdam. This line played a role during the Dutch Golden Age and were part of the Amsterdam and Holland public life and oligarchy from 1578 until 1672. They were a part of the Dutch States Party and therefore opponents of monarchist ambitions of the House of Orange. During that time, members of the De Graeff family were also patrons of art and artists, such as Rembrandt, Govaert Flinck, Gerard ter Borch, Jacob van Ruisdael, Caspar Netscher, Gerard de Lairesse, Artus Quellinus and Joost van den Vondel.

In 1677 members of the Amsterdam line were made knights of the Holy Roman Empire. Since 1885 the new founded Den Haag-line has been part of the Dutch nobility with the honorific of jonkheer.

== Origin ==
According to a family tradition, the family descends from the Austrian Lords Von Graben. Allegedly one Wolfgang von Graben came 1476 to Holland [also named in 1483]. It is said that the family was founded by Wolfgang's son Pieter Graeff (born in Austria as Peter von Graben around 1450/1460) who may lived at the Amsterdam area. It was affirmed that the family De Graeff was formerly called Von Graben, which was the Dutch spelling during the 14th and 15th century. This family today shows the same coat of arms as the De Graeff family. That was also mentioned in the imperial Diploma of Nobility which was loaned to Andries de Graeff on 19 July 1677. Pieter Graeff was married to Griet Pietersdr Berents, a descendant from Wouter Berensz and his wife Dieuwer Willemsz de Grebber, called Berents, of the De Grebber family, baljuws of the Waterland, and Willem Eggert, stadtholder of Holland. The Berents family belonged to the Amsterdam patriciate and low nobility and inherited the fief Randenbroek (Amersfoort) from the De Grebber.

=== Historical and political legacy ===
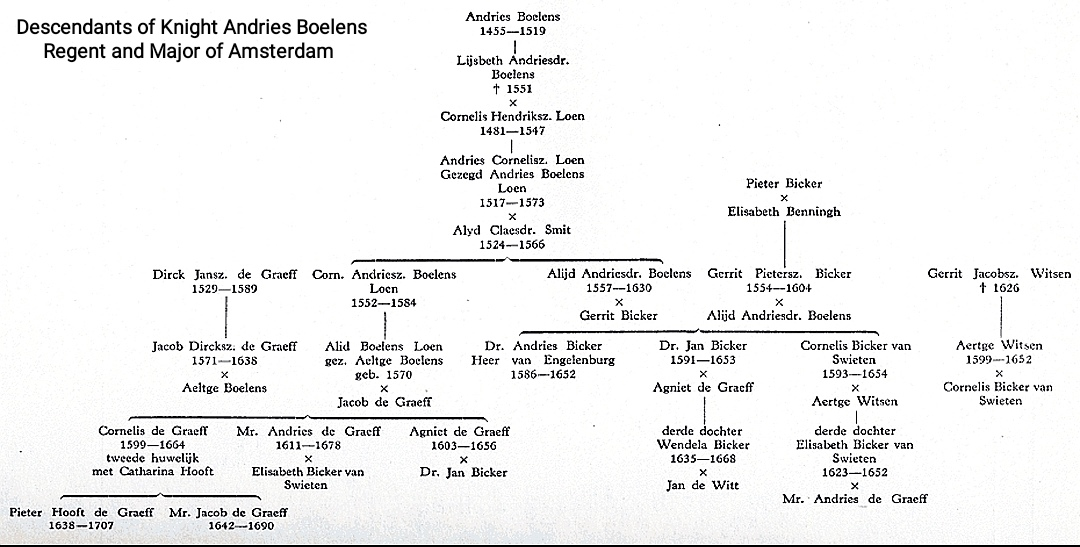
Descendants of Andries Boelens. Overview of the personal family relationships of the Amsterdam oligarchy between the regent-dynasties Boelens Loen, De Graeff, Bicker (van Swieten), Witsen and Johan de Witt in the Dutch Golden Age

Cornelis de Graeff (1599-1664) said that the ancient Amsterdammers had no habit of keeping genealogical records of their families, and knew no more of their generation than what they have learned from their fathers and grandfathers. The dates of his own family in Amsterdam do not go back very far:

And first I'll start with the family de Graven from which I descended on my father's side. This is a family from Amsterdam, coming from the house 'de Keijser', that was located at the Waeter (= now Damrak No. 91). This house shows the impression of its vaulted appearance, owned by Jan Pieters de Graeff, and then by Dirck Jans de Graeff, who also sold this house. My father Jacob de Graeff and his brothers were also born here.

Cornelis and his brother Andries de Graeff (1611-1678), together with their cousins Andries and Cornelis Bicker, saw themselves as the political heirs of the old regent family Boelens, whose main lineage, which had remained Catholic, had died out in the male line in 1647. They had received the first names Andries and Cornelis from their Boelens ancestors. As in a real dynasty, members of the two families frequently intermarried in the 17th century in order to keep their political and commercial capital together. Its historical ancestor was Andries Boelens (1455-1519), mayor of Amsterdam fifteen times from 1496 to 1517. Both the Bicker and De Graeff families descend in the female line from Boelens.

== Family lines ==
1. Amsterdam line (so called main line, includes the Free Lords of Zuid-Polsbroek, Purmerland and Ilpendam)
  1. Dutch-Prussian line 'De Graaff'
  2. Alblasserdam line
    1. Lines at Alkmaar, Leiden and Delft
      1. Illegitimate line 'Graeff'
  3. South African line (founded in 1850)
  4. The Hague line (since 19th century)

=== Amsterdam line ===
==== Beginning ====
Pieter's line was continued by his only known son, Jan Pietersz Graeff (before 1512–1553). It is known that he lived in Amsterdam in the "Huis De Keyser" (named after the "Keizerskroon" attached outside the building) on the Damrak. There he ran a flourishing cloth trade. In 1542 he became a councilor and in 1543 he was appointed alderman (Schepen) of Amsterdam. Due to its political activities, the De Graeff family is one of the few patrician families to sit in government before and after the Amsterdam Alteratie of 1578. Jan Pietersz Graeff had five sons. The second-born Lenaert Jansz de Graeff was a leading member of the Amsterdam Reformed Church, and involved in the religious liberation struggle of the Netherlands in the 1560s and 1570s; on the one hand he was one of the military and religious leaders of Amsterdam under his friend Hendrick von Brederode and probably as "Monseigneur de Graeff" privateer and captain of the watergeus (Sea Beggars) who were involved in the Capture of Brielle in 1572. In recent historical books, De Graeff is treated as one of the leaders of the Sea beggars. His character was also used in a historical novel about De Grote Geus. His third son Dirck Jansz Graeff (1532-1589) continued the main line of the family in Amsterdam. As governing mayor of Amsterdam and friend of William I of Orange (William the Silent), he was able to lay the foundation for the family's political and social influence in Amsterdam. Dirk Jansz was one of the emigrants who fled to Emden from the Spanish army under the Duke of Alba. After his return, Dirck Jansz had shares in over 100 merchant ships. In the years 1584/1585 he was the richest resident of Amsterdam with a fortune of 140,000 guilders.

==== Dutch Golden Age ====
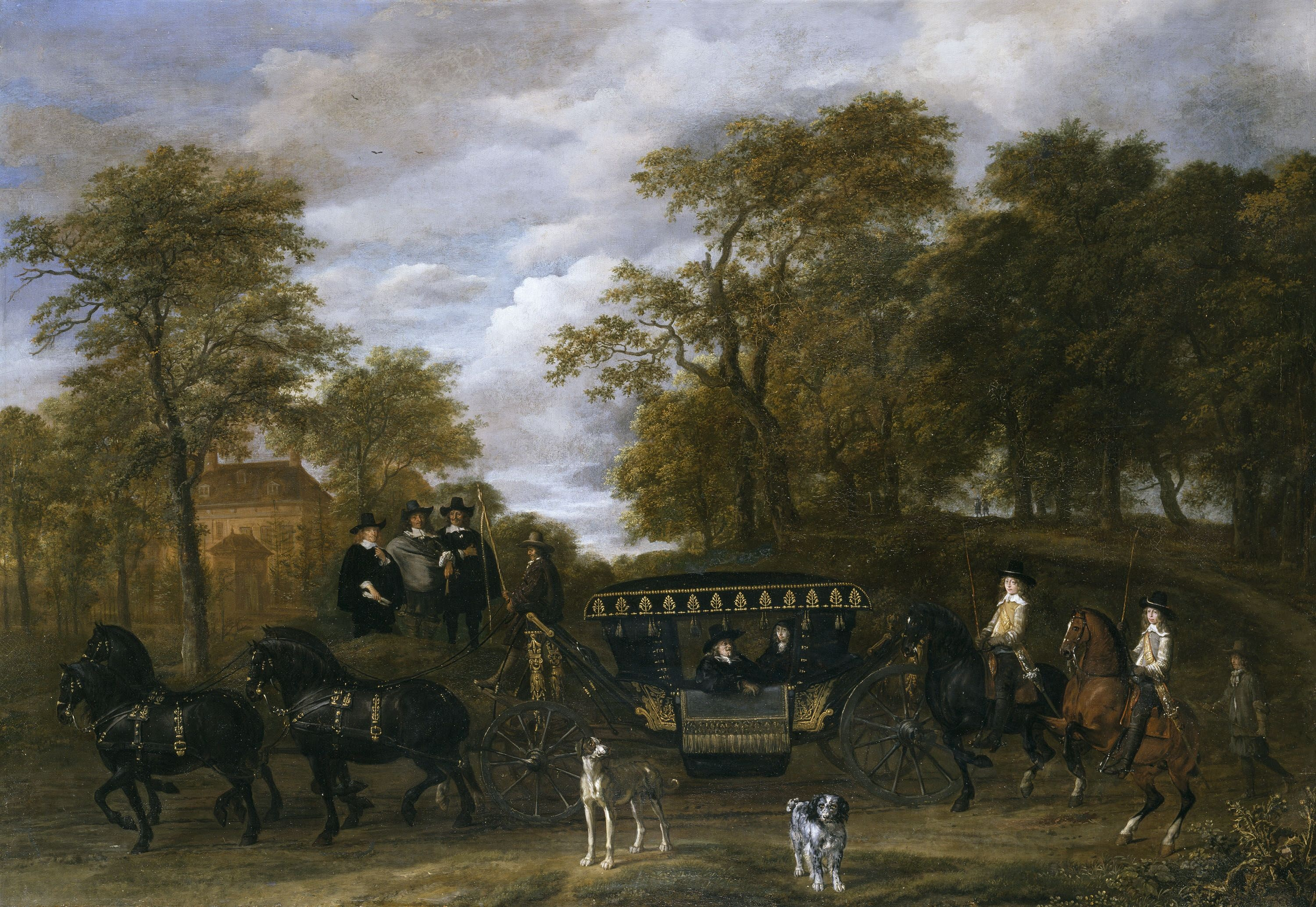
Cornelis de Graeff at Soestdijk, painted by Thomas de Keyser and Jacob van Ruisdael (1656-1660).

During the Dutch Golden Age, the De Graeff family was critical of the influence of the House of Orange. the De Graeffs belonged to the republican political movement of the Regenten, also referred to as the ‘state oriented’, as opposed to the Royalists. Together with the Republican political leaders, the Bicker family and Grand Pensionary Johan de Witt, the republican-minded Jacob Dircksz de Graeff (son of Dirck Jansz Graeff) and his sons Cornelis and Andries de Graeff strived for the abolition of stadtholdership. They desired the full sovereignty of the individual regions in a form in which the Republic of the United Seven Netherlands was not ruled by a single person. Instead of a sovereign (or stadtholder) the political and military power was lodged with the States General and with the regents of the cities in Holland. The De Graeff and Bicker families, for example, tried to imitate the centralistic, autocratic style of government of the Florentine Medici. The Dutch historian and archivist Bas Dudok van Heel said about the power of families like that of de Graeff and Bicker: In Florence, families like Bicker and De Graeff would have been uncrowned princes.

During the two decades from the 1650 to the 1670s the De Graeff family had a leading role in the Amsterdam administration, the city was at the peak of its political power. This period was also referred to by Republicans as the ‘Ware Vrijheid’ (True Freedom). It was the First Stadtholderless Period which lasted from 1650 to 1672 during these twenty years, the regents from Holland and in particular those of Amsterdam, controlled the republic. Even without a stadtholder, things seemed to be going well for the Republic and its regents both politically and economically.

In early 1671, Andries de Graeff was once again put forward as chief-mayor (regent) and managed to gain control with his Republican faction. During the winter of that year it seemed as if – at least in Amsterdam – the Republicans were winning. It was an exceptionally opportune moment to commission a monumental ceiling painting on Amsterdam's independent position for the ‘Sael’ of his mayor's residence. De Graeff had a clear message in mind for the ceiling painting: the ‘Ware Vrijheid’ of the Republic was only protected by the Republican regents of Amsterdam. The paintings by Gerard de Lairesse glorify the de Graeff family's role as the protector of the Republican state, defender of ‘Freedom’. The work of art can be viewed as a visual statement opposing the return of House of Orange as Stadtholders of the republic. In Rampjaar 1672, when the Orangists took power again, the De Graeffs lost their position as one of the key States party families.

===== Patrons of the arts =====
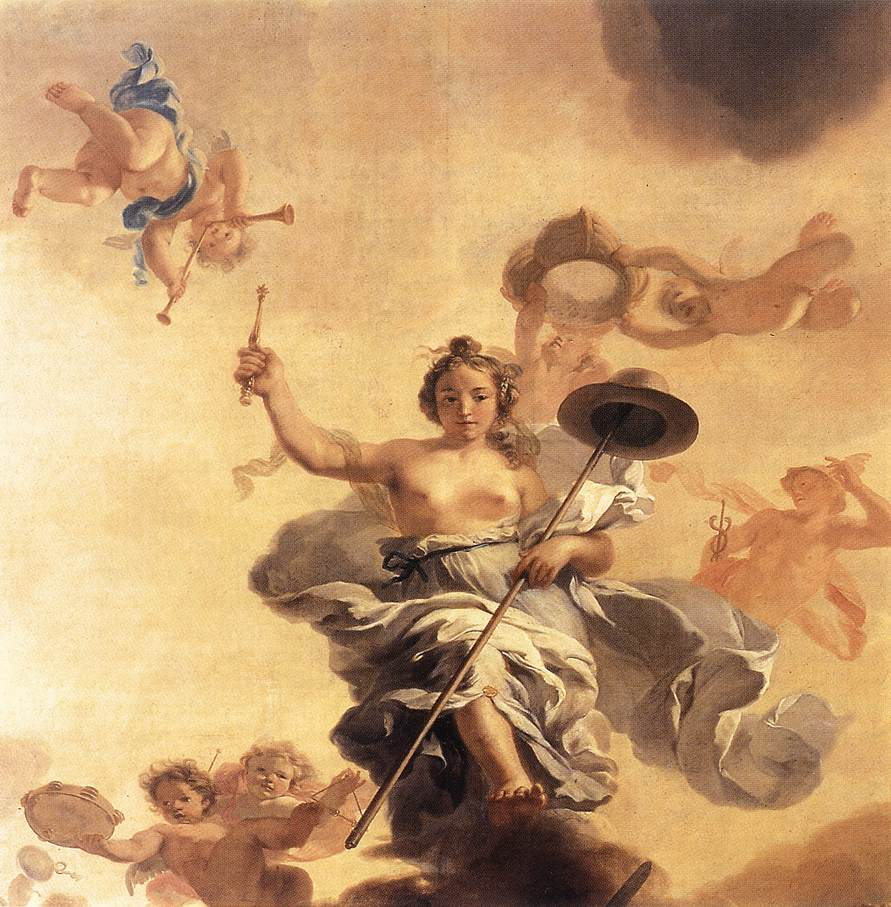
Gérard de Lairesses "Allegory of the Freedom of Trade", glorify the De Graeff family’ as the protector of the Republican state

Throughout the Dutch Golden Age, the family sponsored art and architecture, and were responsible for the majority of Amsterdam art. Andries de Graeff, the first patron of the arts in the family, aided Rembrandt and, together with his brother Cornelis de Graeff, commissioned Govert Flinck, Artus Quellinus and Jacob Jordaens for the construction of the city hall on the Dam in 1655. Andries de Graeff's other notable artistic associates included Gerard ter Borch, Flinck, and Jan Lievens. Andries' brother Cornelis continued in the family tradition of patronizing artists, commissioning works from Jacob van Ruisdael, Nicolaes Eliaszoon Pickenoy, Quellinus, Flinck and Caspar Netscher. The family were also patrons of the poets Joost van den Vondel, Jan Vos, Caspar Barlaeus und Gerard Brandt.

In 1660 Andries and his brother Cornelis de Graeff organized the Dutch Gift, a collection of 28 mostly Italian Renaissance paintings and 12 classical sculptures, which was presented to King Charles II of England by the States-General of the Netherlands in 1660. The gift was made to mark his return to power in the English Restoration. The De Graeffs intended to strengthen diplomatic relations between England and the Republic, but only a few years after the gift the two nations would be at war again in the Second Anglo-Dutch War of 1665–67.

Cornelis' son Pieter de Graeff was also a man who surrounded himself with art and beauty. He was an art collector and patron to the artists Ter Borch, Lievens, Karel Dujardin, Romeyn de Hooghe, Netscher and the poet Van den Vondel. Prof. C.W. Fock of the University of Leiden describes his art collection and lifestyle in her work Het stempel van de bewoner.

==== After the Golden Age ====
After the Amsterdam family De Graeff had lost their political importance in Rampjaar 1672, they were only able to establish themselves to a limited extent in Amsterdam and Dutch politics. During the 18th century, three more family members where part of the City administration, namely Johan de Graeff (1673-1714), Gerrit de Graeff (1711-1752) and Gerrit II de Graeff van Zuid-Polsbroek (1741-1811). During the 19th century the last one and his grandson, the manufacturer Gerrit IV de Graeff (1797–1870), where part of the Amsterdam government. In the 20th century, the family had completely disappeared from city politics, and the Hague Line had taken over the family's political and social leadership.

==== Nobility ====
In 1677, Andries de Graeff and his only son, Cornelis, became a knight of the Holy Roman Empire. They traced their descent from Wolfgang von Graben, member of the Austrian noble House of Graben von Stein, which was an apparent (or illegitimate) branch of the House of Meinhardin. Diplom loaned to Mr. Andries de Graeff, Vienna, July 19, 1677:

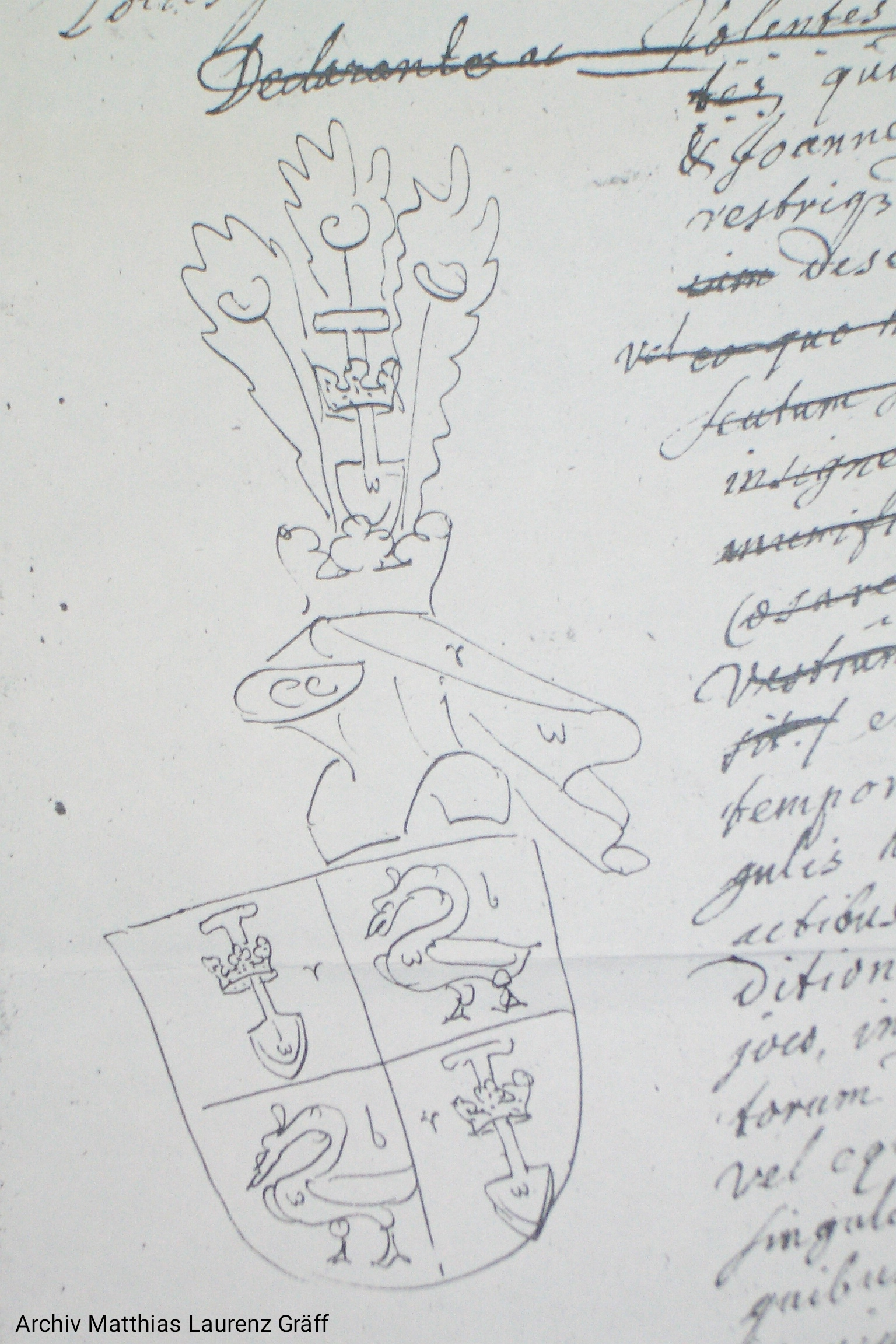
Detail of the imperial Diplom with coat of arms De Graeff Vienna, July 19, 1677 (Archive Matthias Laurenz Gräff)

Fide digis itegur genealogistarum Amsteldamensium edocti testimoniis te Andream de Graeff [Andries de Graeff] non paternum solum ex pervetusta in Comitatu nostro Tyrolensi von Graben dicta familia originem ducere, qua olim per quendam ex ascendentibus tuis ejus nominis in Belgium traducta et in Petrum de Graeff [Pieter Graeff], abavum, Johannem [Jan Pietersz Graeff], proavum, Theodorum [Dirck Jansz Graeff], avum, ac tandem Jacobum [Jacob Dircksz de Graeff], patrem tuum, viros in civitate, Amstelodamensi continua serie consulatum scabinatus senatorii ordinis dignitabitus conspicuos et in publicum bene semper meritos propagata nobiliter et cum splendore inter suos se semper gessaerit interque alios honores praerogativasque nobilibus eo locorum proprias liberum venandi jus in Hollandia, Frisiaque occidentale ac Ultrajectina provinciis habuerit semper et exercuerit.

This title of Holy Empire knight only existed for one year, since both title holders died in the following year. When the Kingdom of the United Netherlands was established in 1815, the De Graeff family received no recognition or elevation to the new Dutch nobility, as Dutch historian and archivist Bas Dudok van Heel put it this way: In Florence families like Bicker and De Graeff would have been uncrowned princes. Here, in 1815, they should at least have been raised to the rank of count, but the southern Dutch nobility would not have put up with that. What you got here remained nothing half and nothing whole. In 1885 Dirk de Graeff van Polsbroek received the new Dutch nobility with the predicate Jonkheer for himself and his descendants. This noble branch still flourishes today.

==== Feudality ====
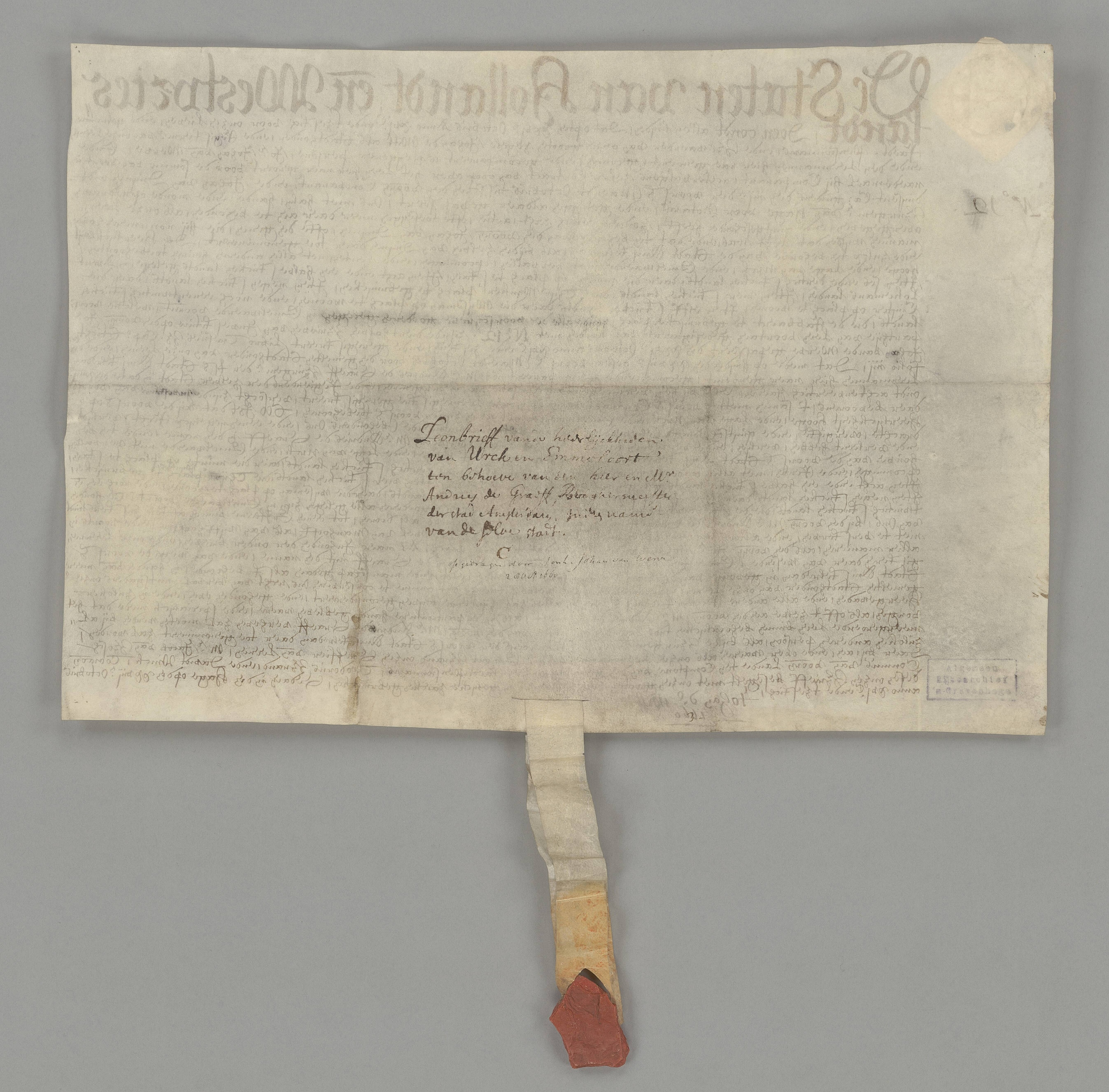
Deed of fief from the States of Holland and West Friesland for Andries de Graeff regarding the High and low Lordship of Urk and Emmeloord

Like many other Dutch patrician families, the De Graeffs endeavored to adopt the way of life and the social appearance of the old dutch nobility and to be recognized by them as equals. Among other things, the acquisition of feudal manorial estates, so-called heerlijkheid, served to justify such claims. which in the Netherlands were also associated with their own jurisdiction. In the case of "lower fiefs" (lage heerlijkheiden or Ambachtsheerlijkheid), this was the lower jurisdiction, while the landlord of a "free" or "high fief" also had high jurisdiction (blood court).

Jacob Dircksz de Graeff was one of the first Dutch regents to come into possession of such grandeur. In 1610 he bought the Free and high fief of Zuid-Polsbroek (hoge of vrije heerlijkheid Zuid-Polsbroek) for himself and his family from Charles de Ligne, prince Aremberg, which at that time was no longer a fiefdom but was freely inheritable and sellable as an allod property. Their acquisition increased the reputation and contributed to the aristocratization of the family, in which De Graeff and his heirs could be addressed as Vrijheer(en) van Zuid-Polsbroek ever since. Furthermore, in 1678 his grandson Jacob de Graeff inherited the Free or high Lordship of Purmerland and Ilpendam (hoge heerlijkheid van Purmerland en Ilpendam). The mansions of Zuid-Polsbroek, Purmerland and Ilpendam were owned by the De Graeff family until 1870.

Furthermore, Pieter Dircksz Graeff (1573-1645) owned the Lordship of Engelenburg. The siblings Alida (1651-1738) and Arnoldina de Graeff (1652-1703) had been vrijvrouwen of the Free and High Lordship Jaarsveld during the 17th and 18th century. Likewise, the De Graeff family held Ambachtsheerlijkheiden as fiefdoms of the city of Amsterdam during the 17th century; Amstelveen, Nieuwer-Amstel, Sloten, Sloterdijk and Osdorp, Urk and Emmeloord. The family had lands and feudal rights in the southern part of Netelenburg, in Duinen in North Holland, in Cromwyk and Hoog Rietveld near Woerden, near Langerak and on the river Lek, the extensive country estates Vredenhof near Voorschoten and Valckeveen (Valkenburg), the later Graeffenveld near Oud-Naarden. Furthermore the held Land in De Graskamp and grounds in Soestdijk, Soestdijk Palace, and Baarn.

==== Coat of arms ====
The ancient (De) Graeff coat of arms shows the shovel from the Herren von Graben and the swan from the De Grebber family from Waterland (county of Holland). The inheritance of the Graben coat of arms is based on the (assumed) male descent of the Graeff-ancestor Pieter Graeff (born around 1450/60) from Wolfgang von Graben. The inheritance of the Grebber coat of arms on the female lineage of Pieter's wife Griet Pietersdr Berents of the 'Berents-De Grebber line'.

Symbols of the coat of arms:

- Shovel: Von Graben
- Swan: De Grebber and the 2nd one since the earlier 17th century stands for the Fief of Vredenhof
- Falcon: Fief of Valkenburg (Valckeveen)
- Rhombus: High Lordship of Zuid-Polsbroek
- Goose: High Lordship of Purmerland
- Lion: High Lordship of Ilpendam
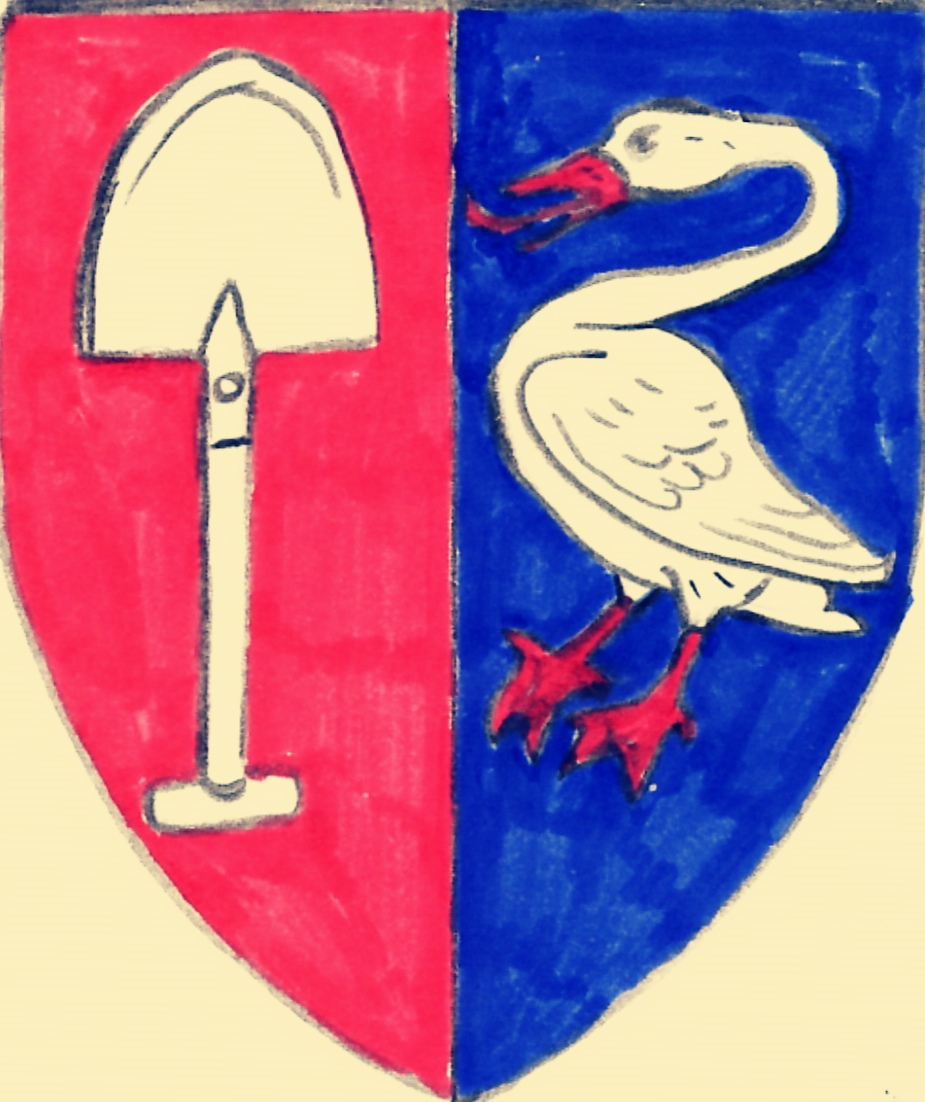
Ancient coat of arms Graeff. The family coat of arms with the silver spade on a red (Von Graben) and silver swan on a blue background (De Grebber) was first documented in 1543 by Jan Pietersz Graeff. (shovel and swan)

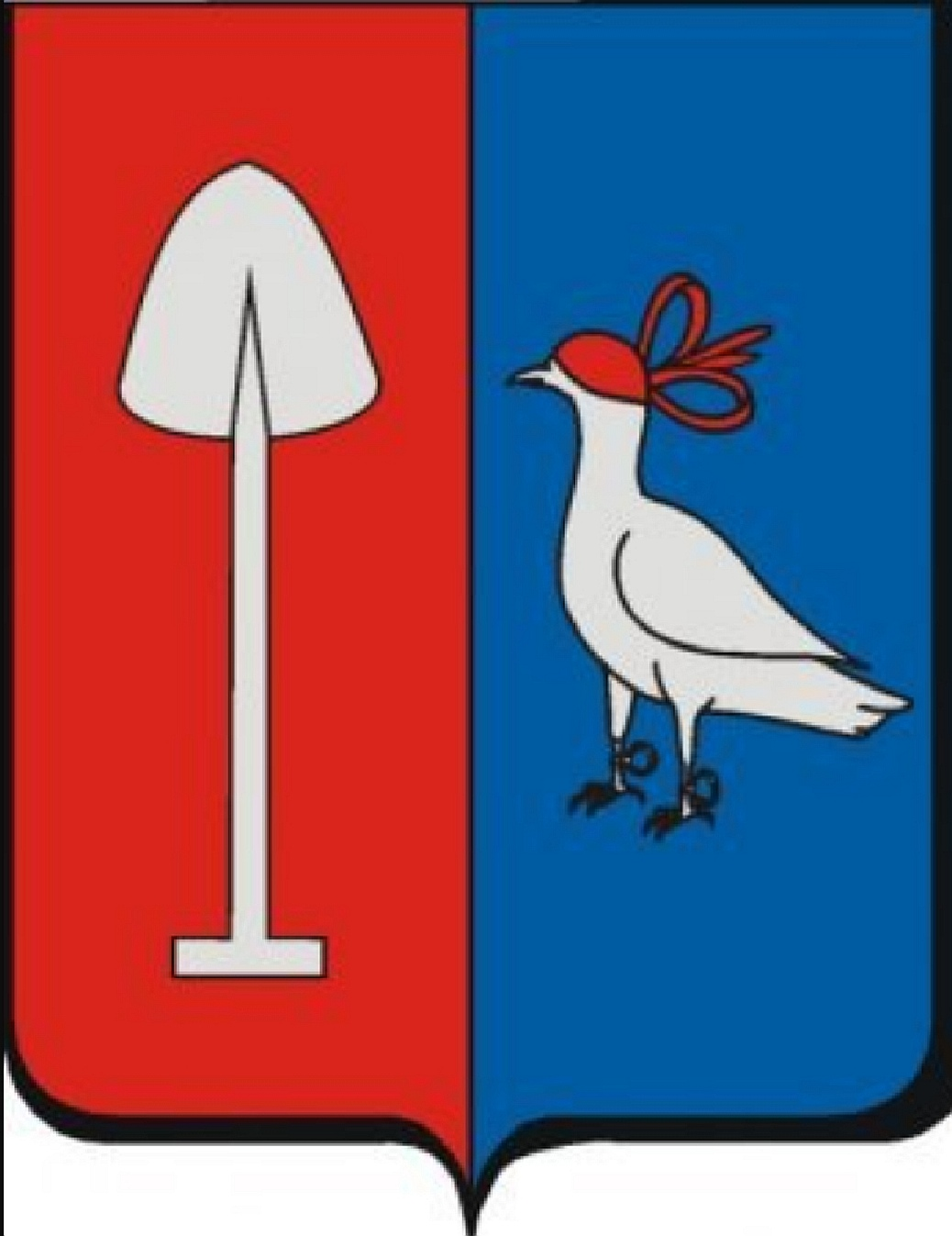
Coat of arms end 16th century (shovel and falcon)

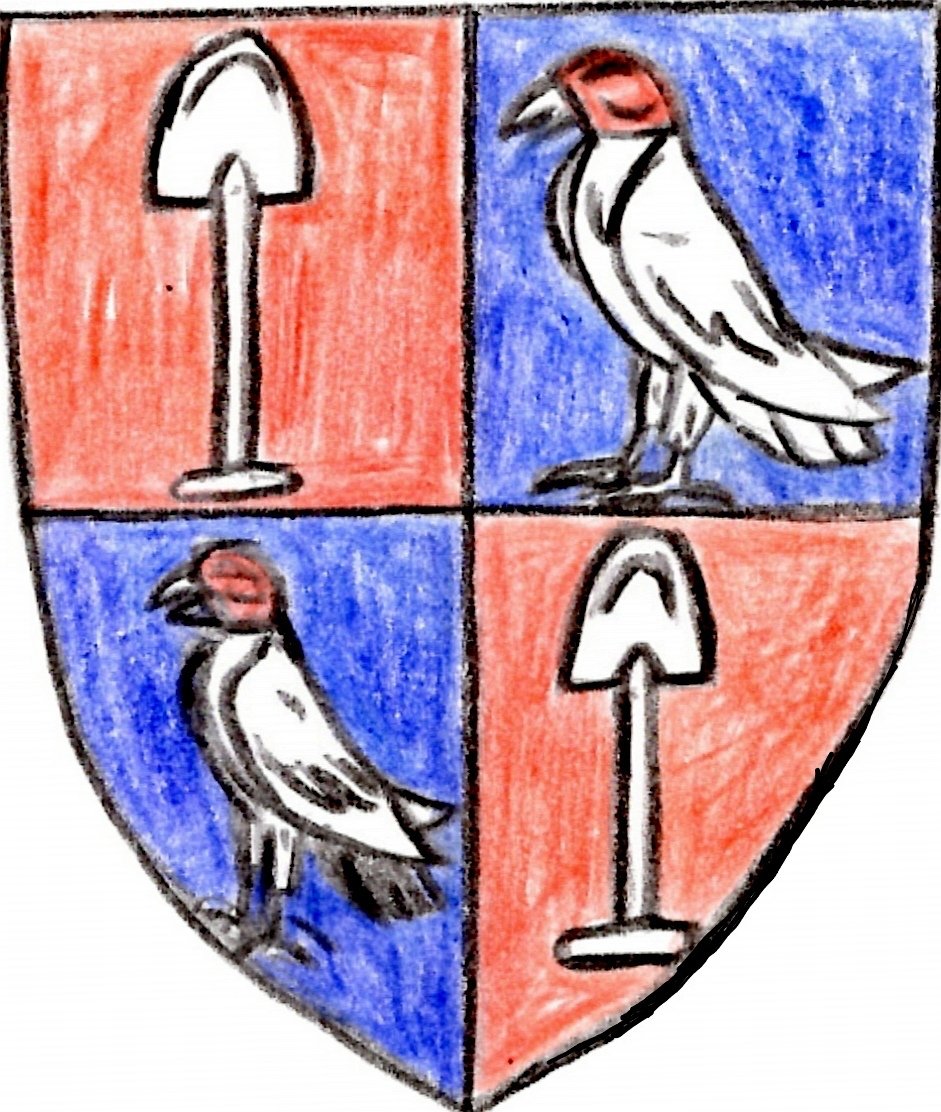
Coat of arms variant 17th-century (shovel and falcon)

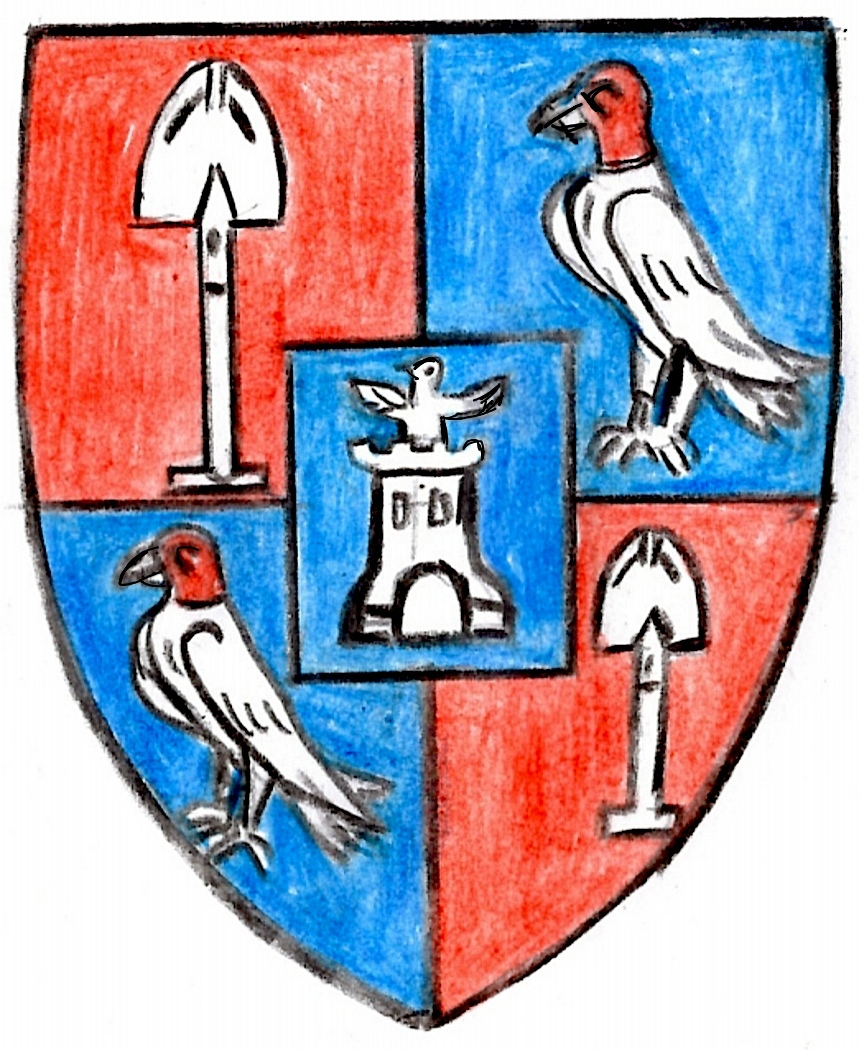
Coat of arms as Lord of Engelenburg. Since 1620, Pieter Dircksz Graeff, as owner of the lordship of Engelenburg, has increased this with a blue Heart shield, charged with a silver castle, from which emerges a rising silver angel with outspread wings.

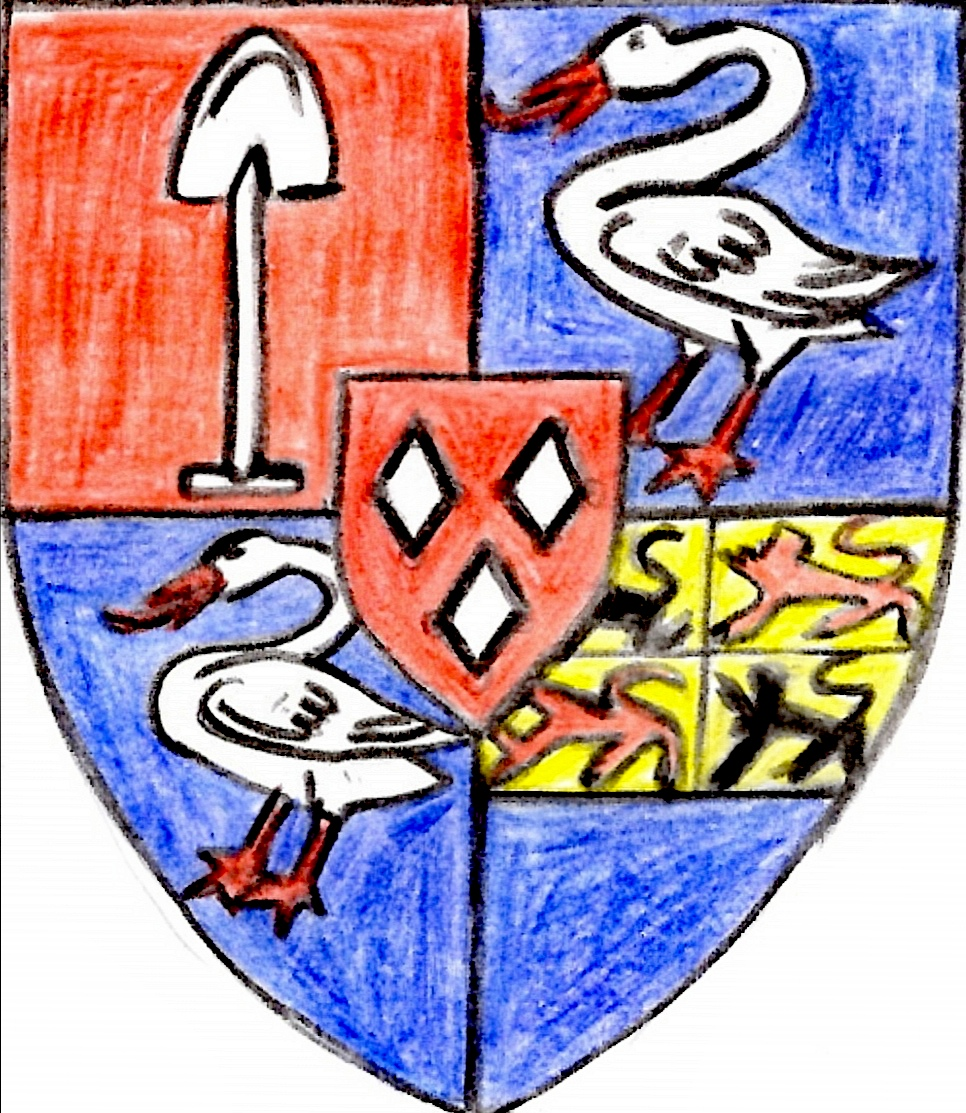
Coat of arms as Free Lords of Zuid-Polsbroek, Purmerland and Ilpendam, 1678 creation (shovel, swan, goose, lion and rhombus)

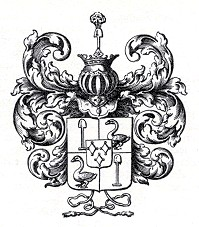
Full coat of arms as Free Lords of Zuid-Polsbroek, 1610–1870 (shovel, swan resp goose and rhombus)

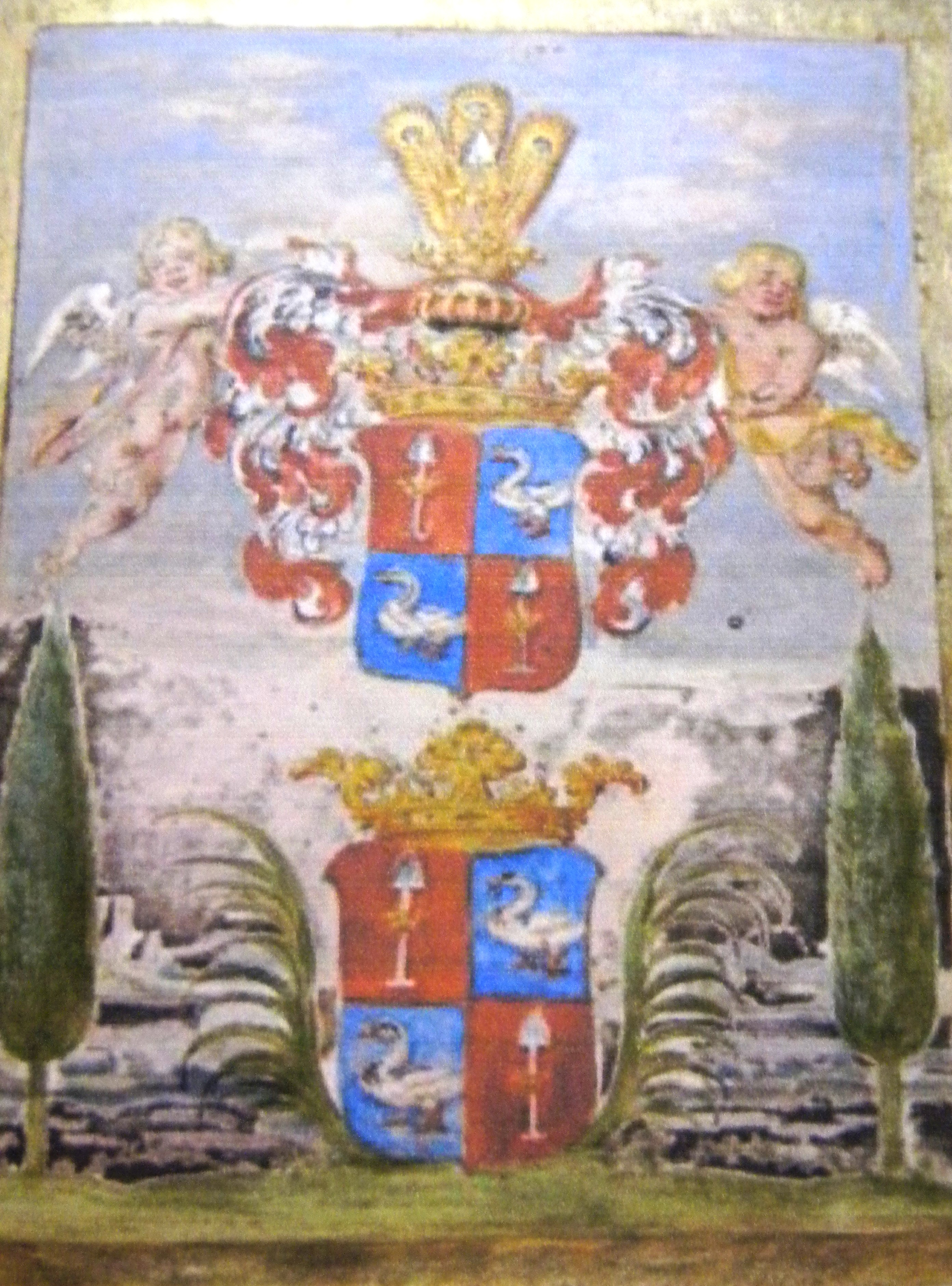
Full coat of arms as Imperial knights, 1677 (shovel and swan)

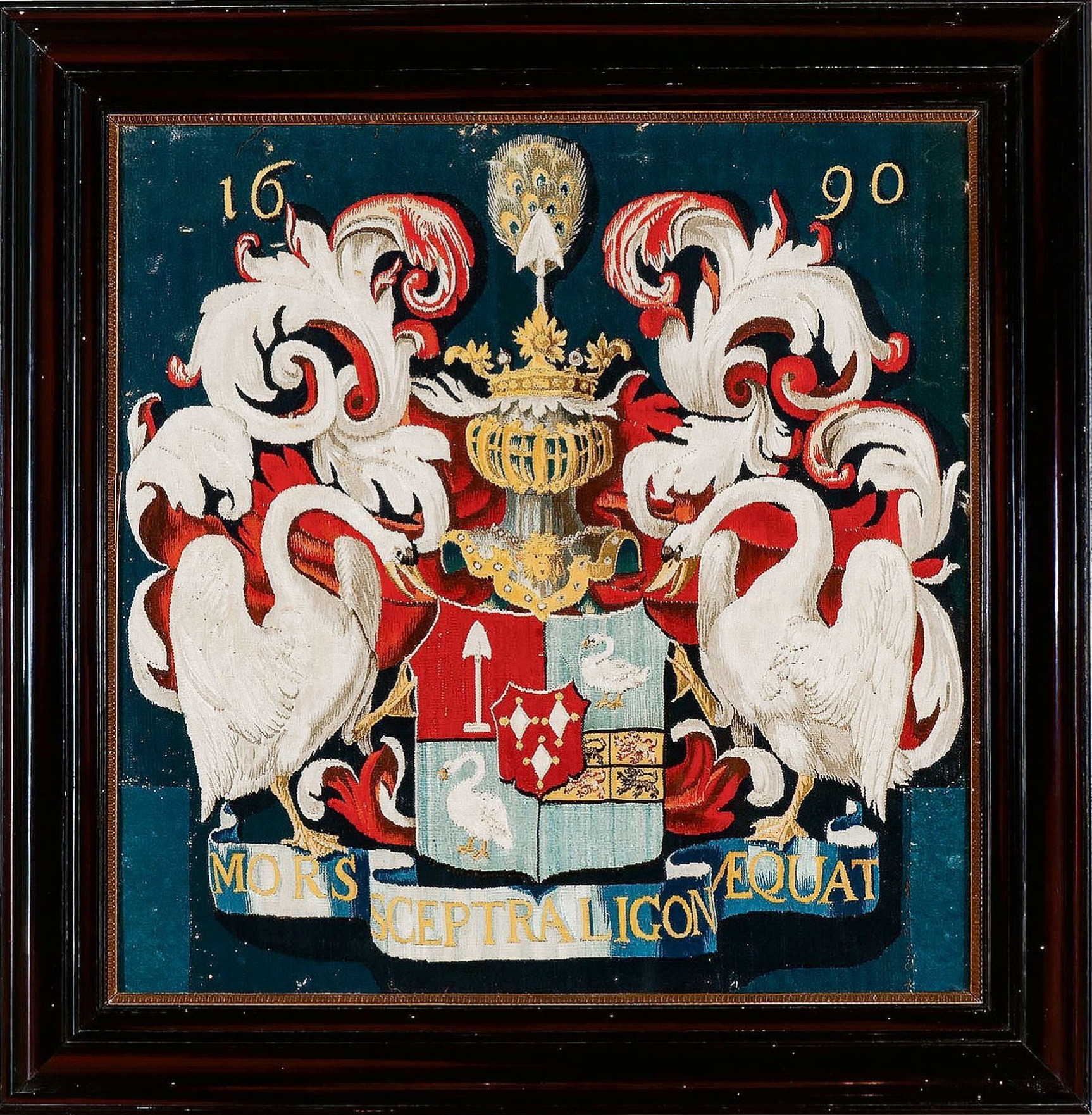
Full coat of arms as Free Lord of Zuid-Polsbroek, Purmerland and Ilpendam, 1690–1741 (shovel, swan, goose, lion and rhombus)

Coat of arms as Jonkheers De Graeff, 1885 (shovel and swan)

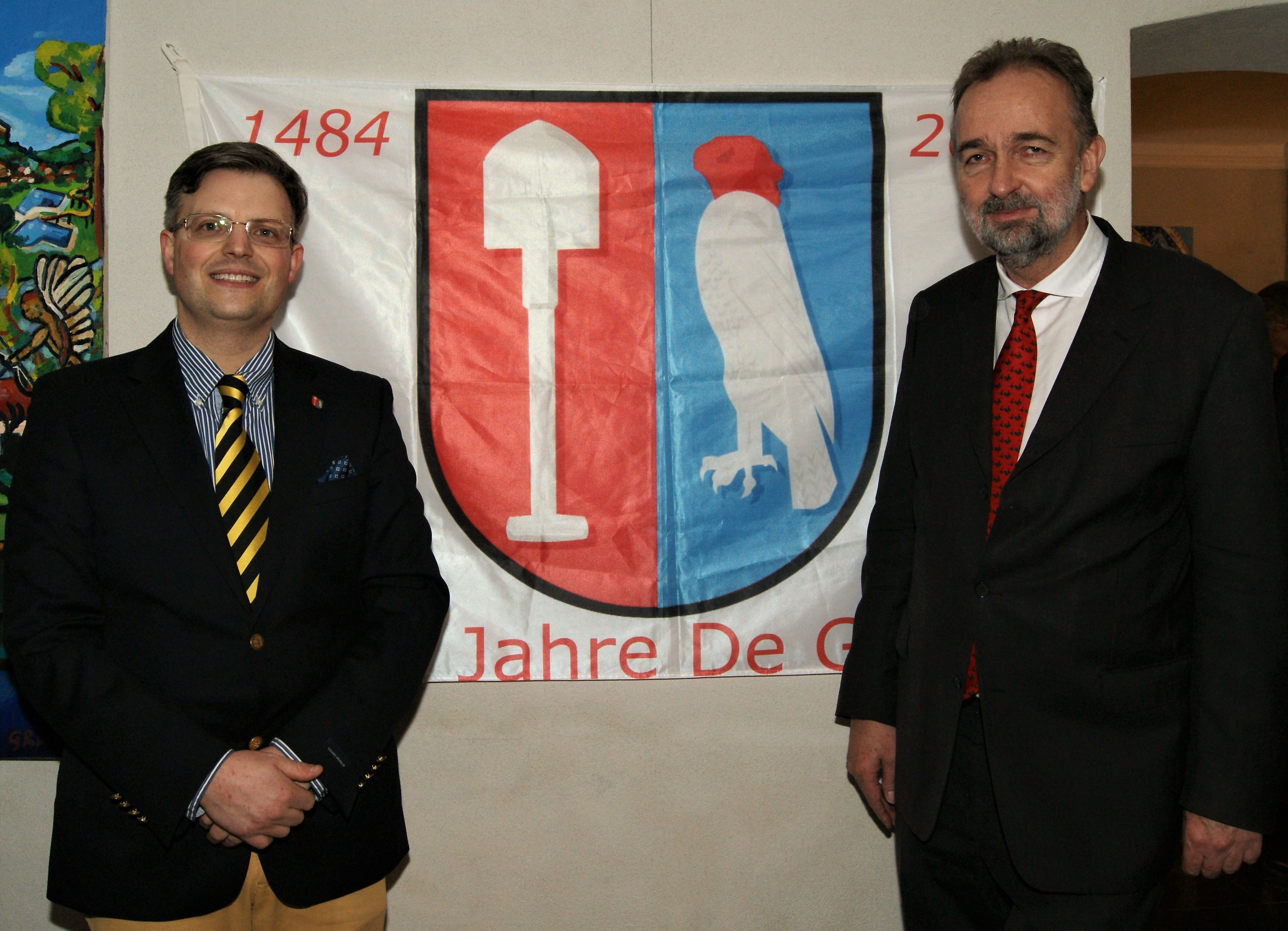
Matthias Laurenz Gräff and Karl von Habsburg, head of the House Habsburg-Lorraine, the former imperial and royal house of the Holy Roman Empire and Austria

===== Coat of arms Pieter de Graeff =====
The coat of arms of Pieter de Graeff (1638-1707) is quartered with a heart shield and since 1678 it shows the following symbols:

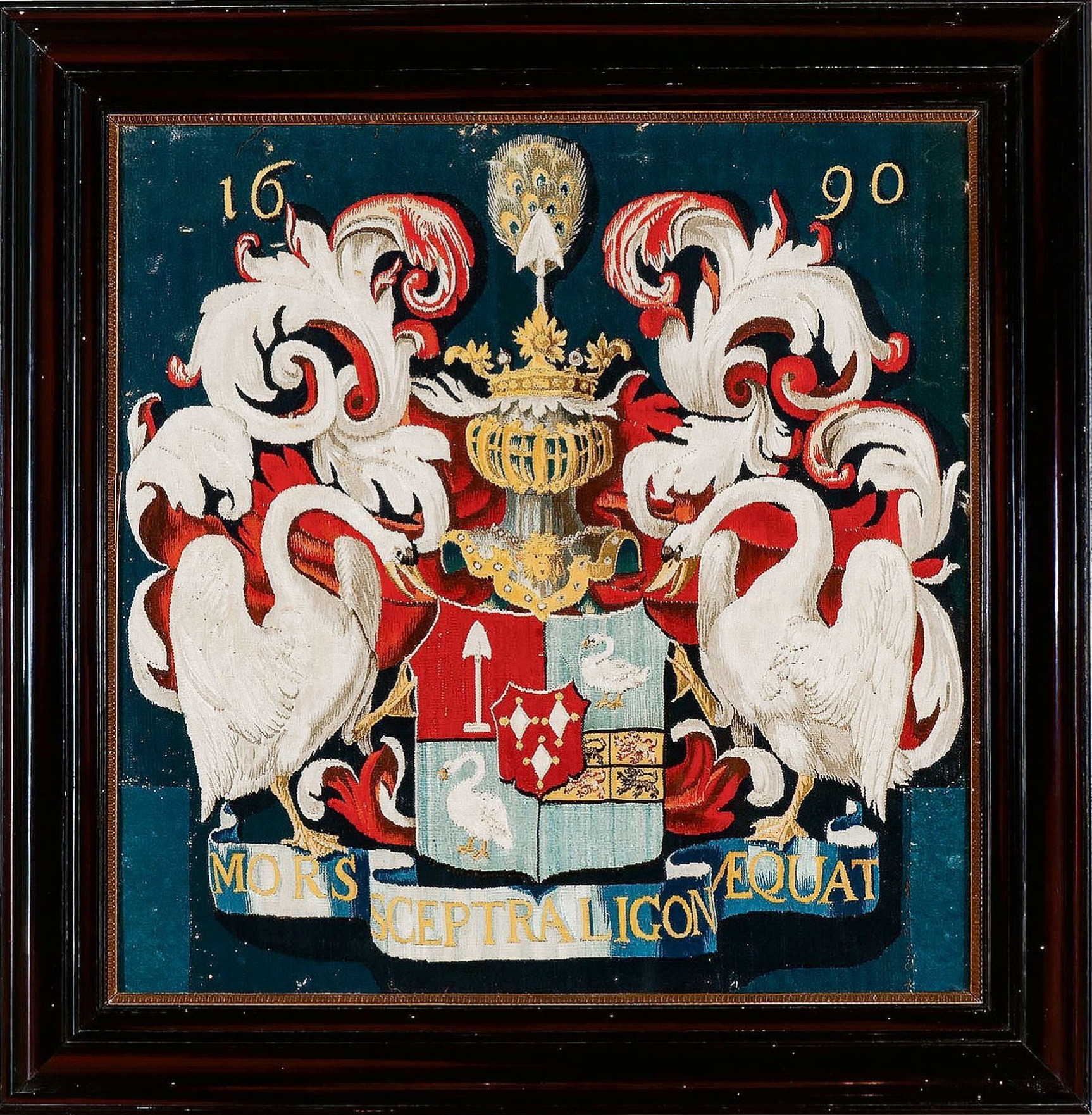
Coat of arms of Pieter de Graeff in 1690

- heart shield shows the three silver rhombuses on red (originally from the family Van Woerdern van Vliet) of the High Lordship Zuid-Polsbroek
- field 1 (left above) shows the silver shovel on red of their paternal ancestors, the Herren von Graben
- field 2 (right above) shows the silver swan on blue of the Fief Vredenhof or that one (Waterland) of one of their maternal ancestors, the De Grebber
- field 3 (left below) shows the silver goose in blue of Purmerland (High Lordship Purmerland and Ilpendam)
- field 4 (right below) shows the red and black lions on gold (the arms of the County of Holland) for Ilpendam (High Lordship Purmerland and Ilpendam) above a blue area
- shield holders are two silver swans
- helmet covers in red and silver
- helm adornment shows an upright silver spade with ostrich feathers (Herren von Graben)
- motto: MORS SCEPTRA LIGONIBUS AEQUAT (DEATH MAKES SEPTRES AND HOES EQUAL)

=== Other Dutch lines ===
Secondary lines split off from Jacob Jansz Graeff († ca. 1580), the youngest son of Jan Pietersz Graeff. These lived in the cities of Alblasserdam, Alkmaar, Leiden and Delft, but could not gain influence like those who remained in Amsterdam. The best-known member was the Dutch Rear Admiral Albert Claesz de Graeff, a great-grandson of Jacob Jansz Graeff. It is not known whether there are still male descendants from these branches today.

There are also descendants of Jacob Jansz Graeff's († ca. 1580) illegitimate son Adriaan Jacobsz Graeff, but nothing further is known about their life.

=== Dutch-Prussian line ===
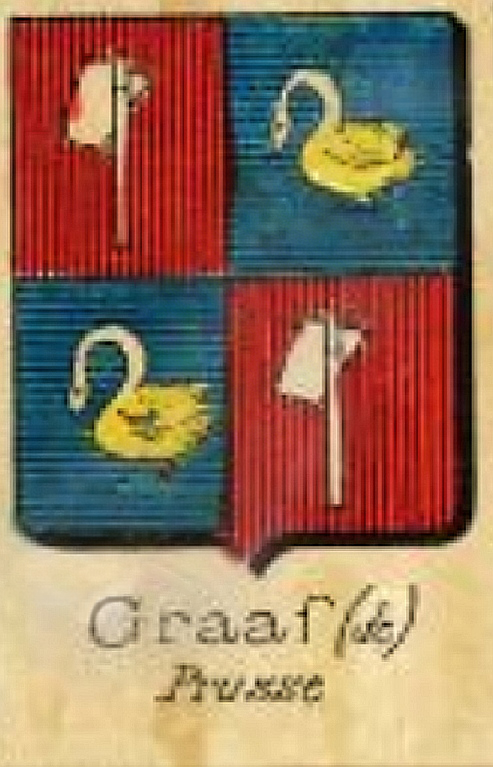
Coat of arms De Graaff/De Graaf at Prussia

Another branch of the family was based in Holland as well as in Prussia (Germany). According to the Genealogische Taschenbuch der Ritter- u. Adels-Geschlechter (Genealogical Paperback of Knights and Nobles), the Prussian De Graaff family of the 19th century came from the Amsterdam line of the De Graeff. According to the genealogical paperback of the knight and nobility families, the Prussian branch descended from Dirk Reynier de Graaff (named 1596) a son of Lenaert Jansz de Graeff (Leonardus de Graaff; 1525/30 - before 1578), older brother of Dirk Jansz Graeff, burgomaster of Amsterdam. It is not possible to determine why this patrician family, for which no rise in nobility status can be proven, appears in a genealogical work on noble families. This ancestry is also confirmed by the Rietstap Armorial Général, who also registered the (De)Graeff coat of arms by bearers in former Prussia as Graaff (de), Prusse - Orig. de Hollande (also spelled de Graaf). The coat of arms is described in the original as follows: Graaff (de) Prusse - Orig. de Hollande - Écartelé aux 1 et 4 de gueules à une bêche d'argent le fer en haut aux 2 et 3 d'azur à un cygne d'argent Cimier la bêche sommée de trois plumes de paon au naturel Lambrequin d'argent et de gueules. As the coat of arms describes a swan next to the spade [and not a goose, which the De Graeffs used as (Vrij)heeren van Purmerland en Ilpendam from 1655 to 1678 instead of the swan], this confirms their descent from the Amsterdam line before a split of theirs Property in 1638 (the death of Jacob Dircksz de Graeff). During the 1870s, the brothers Gérard Hendrik Reinardus de Graaff (1853-1917) and Henri (Heinrich) de Graaff (1857-1924), sons of the lawyer Reinardus Joostinus Marinus de Graaff (* 1829) from The Hague, went as officers in the Prussian military service. Henri was promoted to Prussian lieutenant-general in World War I and Gérard Hendrik Reinardus ranked as major general. Both also lived in Berlin. It is not known whether there is an offspring.

=== South African line ===
The lineage in South Africa descends from Gerrit Arnold Theodoor de Graeff (b. 1831), a brother of Dirk de Graeff van Polsbroek. This line is still thriving today.

=== The Hague line ===
Other lines and branches, also from the Amsterdam main line, are scattered throughout the Netherlands, such as The Hague line. This came from the important diplomat Dirk de Graeff van Polsbroek (1833-1916). He was Dutch Consul General and Minister-Resident to Japan and due his relationship with Emperor Meiji he laid the foundation for modern diplomatic representation in Japan of various European States. In 1885 he received the new Dutch nobility with the predicate Jonkheer for himself and his descendants. This noble branch still flourishes today. Dirk's son was Andries Cornelis Dirk de Graeff, diplomat, minister and governor-general, who was able to continue the politically committed and successful tradition of his family in the 20th century. Various family members were also active in engineering, in the water authorities, as state inspectors and commissioners, directors, in court service at the Dutch royal court and as financial and company managers. Representatives of this are Dirk Georg de Graeff and Jan Jaap de Graeff.

==== Nobility ====
Some members of the line at The Hague belonged to the New Dutch nobility. In 1885 Dirk de Graeff van Polsbroek, originally from the Amsterdam branch, received the predicate Jonkheer for himself and his descendants. This noble branch, descended from Dirk, still flourishes today [when?].

== See also ==
- De Graeff family tree
- Semisouverain fief of Zuid-Polsbroek
- Fief of Purmerend, Purmerland and Ilpendam
- Ilpenstein Castle
- Herengracht 573
- Soestdijk Palace

== Literature ==
- Burke, P. (1994). Venice and Amsterdam: A Study of Seventeenth-Century Élites.
- Israel, Jonathan I. (1995). The Dutch Republic: Its Rise, Greatness, and Fall 1477–1806. Clarendon Press, Oxford, ISBN 978-0-19-820734-4
- Rowen, Herbert H. (1986). John de Witt" Statesman of the "True Freedom". Cambridge University Press, ISBN 0-521-52708-2
- Zandvliet, Kees. De 250 rijksten van de Gouden Eeuw - Kapitaal, macht, familie en levensstijl (2006 Amsterdam; Nieuw Amsterdam Uitgevers)
