= Lenaert Jansz de Graeff =

Dutch noble

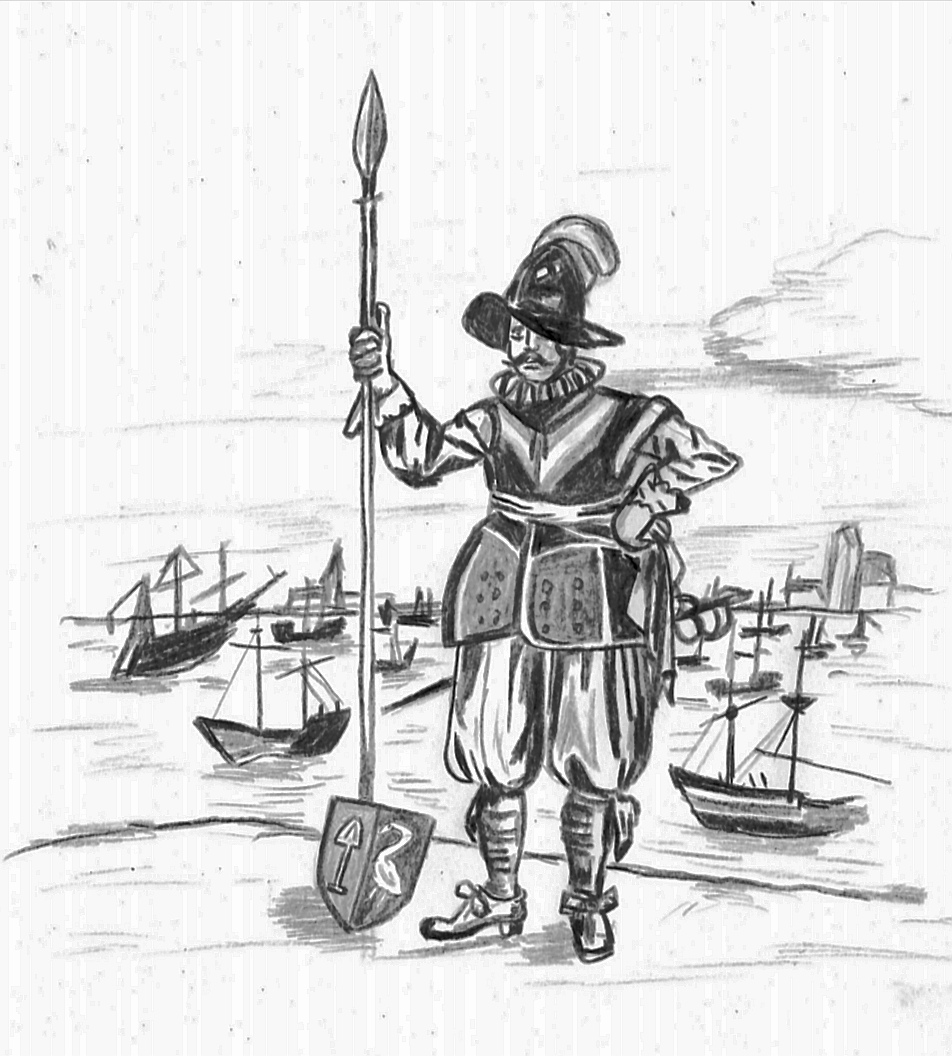

Lenaert Jansz de Graeff before the conquest of Brille in a historical sketch by Matthias Laurenz Gräff

vice-general-captain of Amsterdam
- In office 1567–1567

co-leader of the Sea Beggars during the Capture of Brielle
- In office 1572–1572

Personal details
- Born: circa 1525 /30 Amsterdam
- Died: before 1578 in exile
- Party: States Faction
- Spouse: Griet Jansdr Duivens
- Occupation: military commander
- Profession: wholesaler and ship-owner

Lenaert Jansz de Graeff, also Lena(e)rt Jansz Graeff, Leendert de Graeff and Leonhard de Graeff (Amsterdam, c. 1525 – in Exile, c. 1578) belonged to the powerful Amsterdam patriciate. He was one of the leaders of the Protestant Reformation in Amsterdam, a friend of Henry, Count of Bréderode, the "Grote Geus", and his deputy as vice-general-captain of Amsterdam, and according to a family tradition identified with "Monseigneur de Graeff", a privateer and captain of the Sea Beggars during the Capture of Brielle. In recent research, Lenaert Jansz de Graeff is described as one of the leaders of the Sea Beggars alongside Admiral William II de la Marck, Lord Lumey and Willem Bloys van Treslong. His character was also used in a historical novel about De Grote Geus.

== Biography ==
=== Family ===
Lenaert Jansz de Graeff was a member of the patrician family De Graeff, son of Jan Pietersz Graeff, a cloth wholesaler and member of the City government of Amsterdam and his wife Stein Braseman. He grew up at the paternal cityhouse De Keyser on Damrak (named after the "Keizerskroon" attached outside the building). The family belonged to the Reformed Church, a fact that made Lenaert and his younger brother Dirck Jansz Graeff work in a social-political direction. Lenaert was married to Griet Jansdr Duivens. The couple had four children:

- Steyntje Leonardsdr de Graeff (Stijn Leenaertsdr Graeff) born 1550, married to Ellert Hendricksz Rooclaes (Roclaas) (died March 1610)
- Pieter Leonardsz de Graeff (Pieter Leenaertsz Graeff) born 1551, married; unknown descendants
- Jannetje Leonardsdr de Graeff (Jannetge Leenaertsdr Graeff), married to Hillebrand Jorisz (5 September 1559 – 27 May 1632) (the descendants of his brother Cornelis Jorisz took the surname and coat of arms of his wife Grietje Backer of Bremen); Jannetge was aunt of Willem Cornelisz Backer. Another relationship led her to the Hamburg patrician von Eitzen family, since a daughter from the family of her niece Cornelia Backer married into the family of Albrecht von Eitzen (mayor of Hamburg from 1623 to 1653).
- Jan Leonhardsz de Graeff, unknown if he ever married and/or had descendants
- Dirk Reynier de Graeff (named 1596) is listed as another son of "Leonardus de Graaff" in the Genealogische Taschenbuch der Ritter- u. Adels-Geschlechter (Genealogical Paperback of Knights and Nobles). He is believed to be the ancestor of a branch of the family spelled De Graaff (De Graaf), who lived in Holland and later in Prussia (Germany) as well. This ancestry is also confirmed by the Rietstap Armorial Général, who also registered the (De)Graeff coat of arms by bearers in former Prussia as Graaff (de), Prusse - Orig. de Hollande (also spelled de Graaf). The coat of arms is described in the original as follows: Graaff (de) Prusse - Orig. de Hollande - Écartelé aux 1 et 4 de gueules à une bêche d'argent le fer en haut aux 2 et 3 d'azur à un cygne d'argent Cimier la bêche sommée de trois plumes de paon au naturel Lambrequin d'argent et de gueules. During the 1870s, the brothers Gérard Hendrik Reinardus de Graaff (1853-1917) and Henri (Heinrich) de Graaff (1857-1924), sons of the lawyer Reinardus Joostinus Marinus de Graaff (* 1829) from The Hague, went as officers in the Prussian military service. Heinrich was promoted to Prussian lieutenant-general in World War I. Both also lived in Berlin. It is not known whether there is an offspring

==== Coat of arms ====
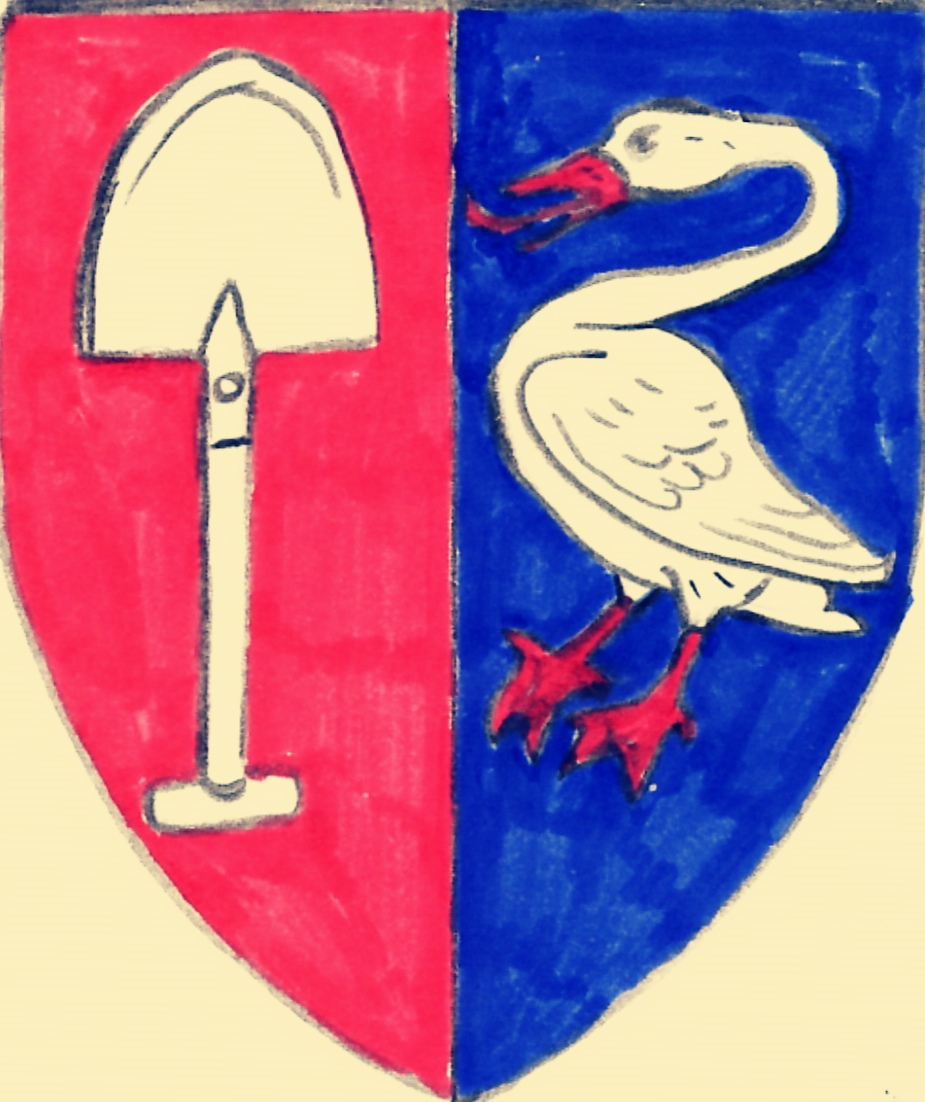
Ancient coat of arms De Graeff

Lenaert Jansz de Graeff used the following family coat of arms:

- In Coat of Arms Field I, it shows the silver shovel of the Herren von Graben on a red background and in Coat of Arms Field II, on a blue background, a silver swan that is said to come from the De Grebber family from Waterland.

=== Carriere ===
==== Amsterdam ====
De Graeff's profession was as a merchant, wholesaler and shipowner. He bought and sold steel at his house De Keyser in the street now called the Damrak. Like his brothers, Jan, Dirck and Jacob, Lenaert was one of the richest burghers of Amsterdam. In 1564, Lenaert was a member of a delegation who spoke with the Spanish Regent Margaret of Parma about the political situation in Amsterdam and the province of Holland.

In 1567, De Graeff, together with Adriaen Pauw and Cornelis Boelens was against Charles de Brimeu's entry into Amsterdam. In March of that year, backed by De Graeff, his brother Dirck Jansz and a large part of the bourgeoisie, Henry, Count of Bréderode became the General-captain of the city. A contract which backed up that election was signed at De Graeff's house De Keyser. Lenaert Jansz de Graeff became his friend, adviser, and vice-general-captain of Amsterdam, at the head of a newly formed company of 400 citizens. The following month Brederode departed. The Spanish General Philippe de Noircarmes then became the military leader of Amsterdam, and De Graeff lost his position. In August — on the arrival of Fernando Álvarez de Toledo, 3rd Duke of Alba — he left the city with his second wife, Griet Hendriksdr Rooclaas, because he was suspected of Calvinist leanings. In December, De Graeff, along with many other opponents of the regime, was summoned before the Council of Troubles, where all his belongings were to be confiscated. In 1569 De Graeff moved to Bruges, and from there to England, where he stayed with other exiles from Holland.

==== Sea Beggars ====
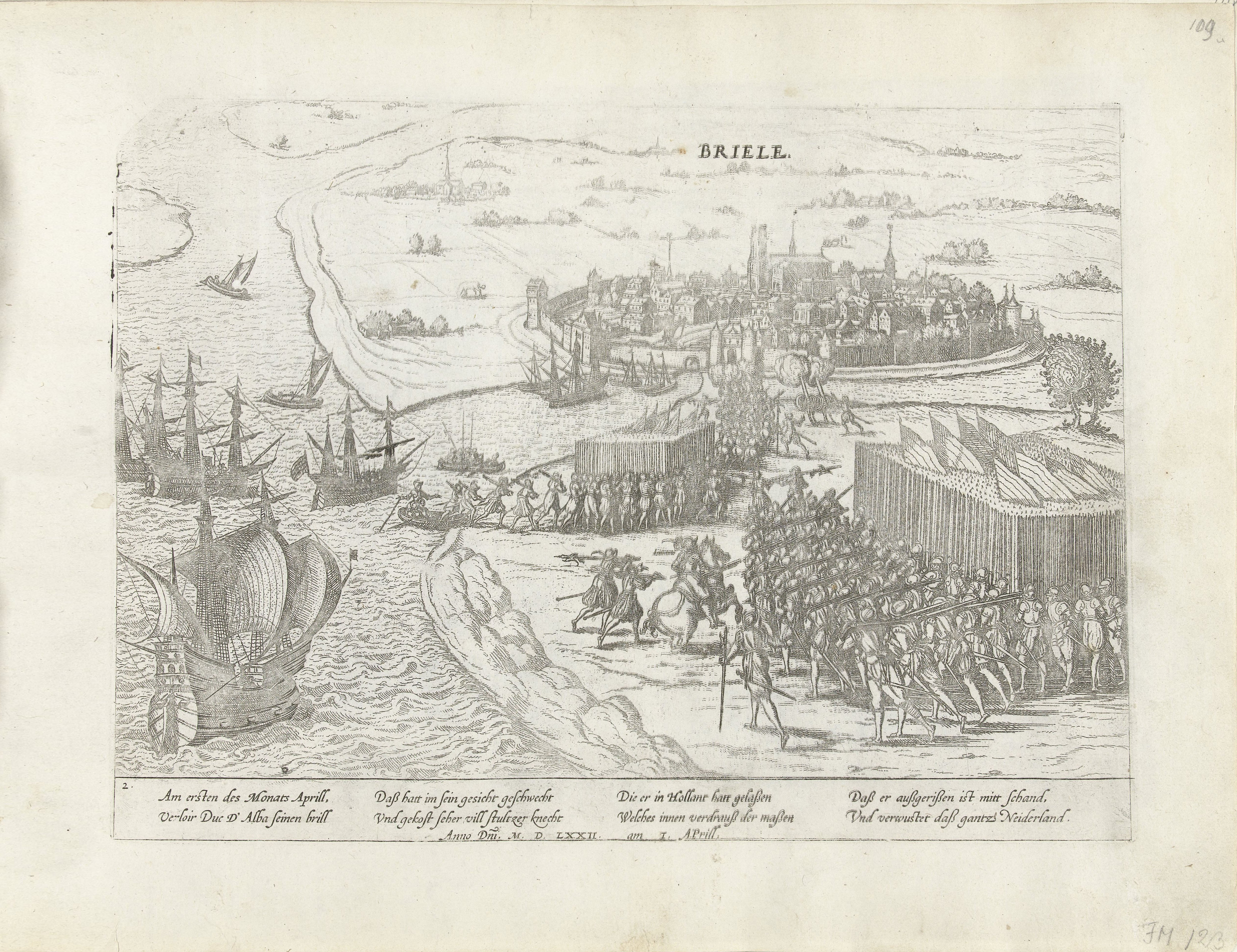
The Capture of Brielle by the Fleet of Sea Beggars – Engraving by Frans Hogenberg

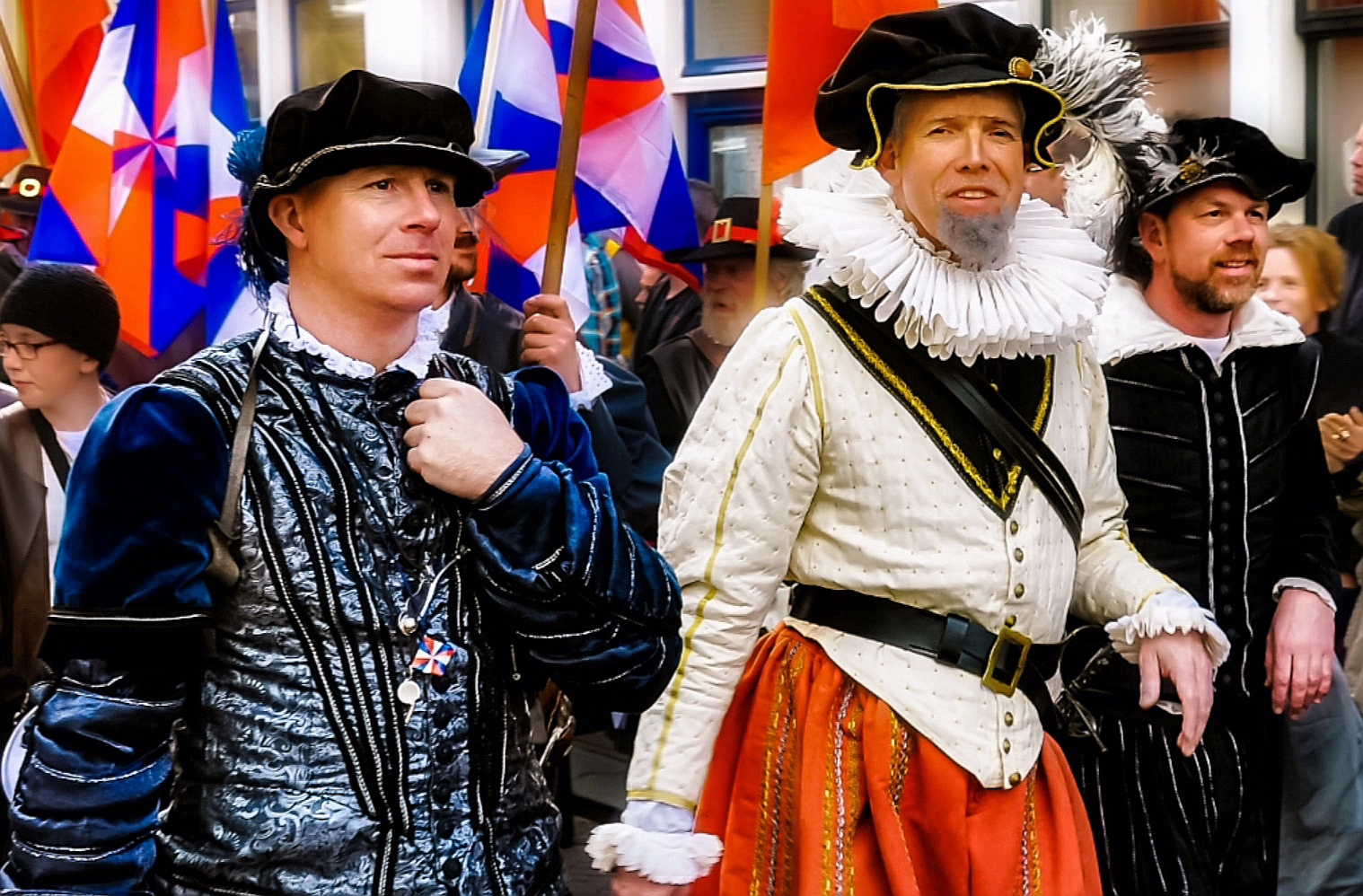
Historic parade in Den Briel to celebrate the 540th anniversary of the Capture of Brielle on April 1, 2012. The leaders of the sea beggars, William II de la Marck, Lord Lumey (middle), Willem Bloys van Treslong (left) and Lenaert Jansz de Graeff (right).

Lenaert Jansz de Graeff emigrated to Bruges and traveled to England together with other emigrants to equip some warships there, which later combined under his command with the Geuzen fleet of Admiral William II de la Marck, Lord Lumey. Given these facts and according to a family tradition, Lenaert Jansz de Graeff is most likely identical "Monsieur de Graeff van Brugge", one of the Sea Beggars (Watergeuzen). De Graeff appears in a historical rendering for the first time in the fleet of the Watergeuzen in the autumn of 1571 as "Monsieur de Graeff van Brugge". He first plundered a ship from Emden coming from Brouage loaded with salt. The ship was towed with crew and cargo to Dover, and held there for seven weeks, until a ransom of 200 kronen was paid at Dover. In the next year, he equipped a few ships in England, after which he joined the Sea Beggars fleet of De la Mark, Lord Lumey. In March they cruises in the North Sea, and on April 1, 26 ships, including De Graeff's, managed to get into the Meuse estuary off Brielle through a heavy Storm. He took part with his ships in the Capture of Brielle on 1 April 1572, which was successful for the water creatures. He was deputy to Lord Lumey, along with Willem Bloys van Treslong. There is no further historical record of his life. Lenaert Jansz de Graeff died in exile before the year 1578.

Dutch author Jaap van de Wal outlined his character in the historical novel De erfenis van de Grote Geus (De Graeffs friend Hendrick van Brederode).
