= Jan Pietersz Graeff =

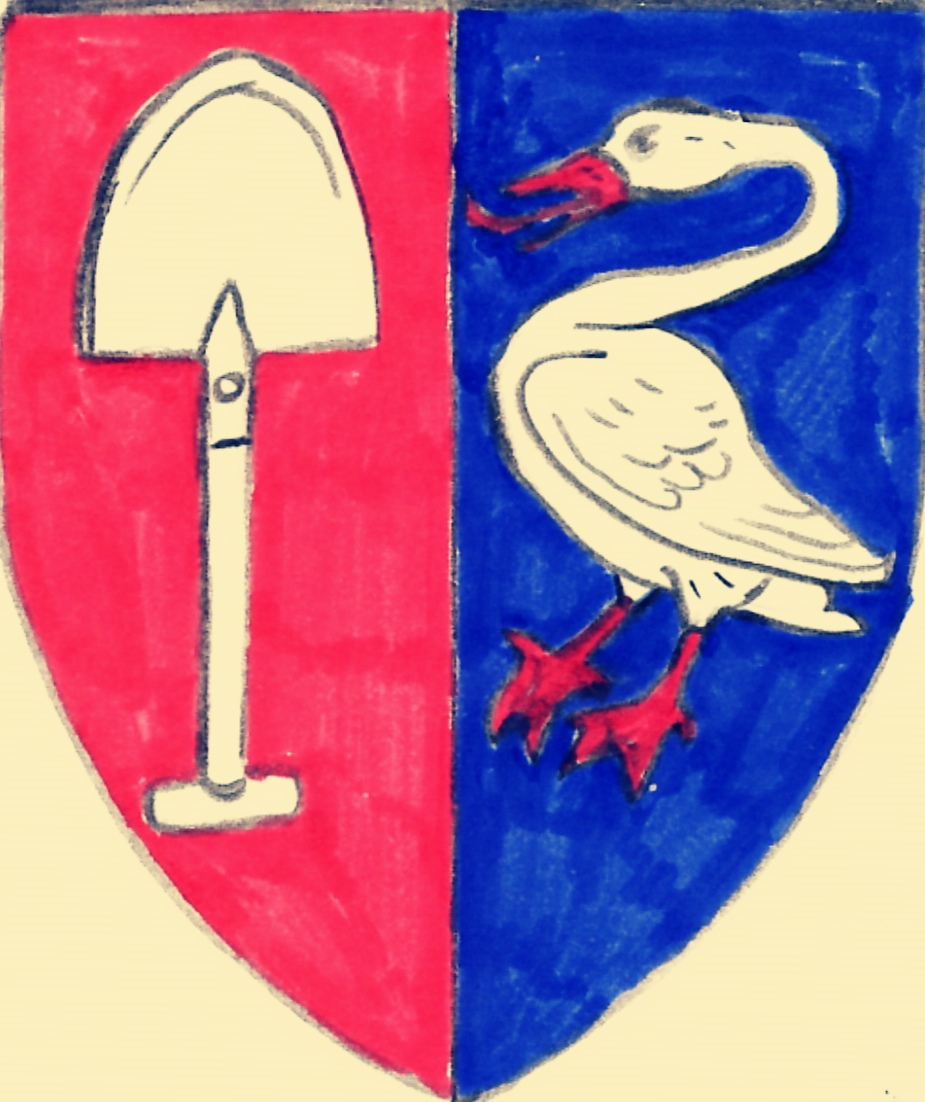
Coat of arms Graeff (ancient). The family coat of arms with the silver spade on a red (Von Graben) and silver swan on a blue background (De Grebber) was first documented in 1543 by Jan Pietersz Graeff.

Jan Pietersz Graeff (Amsterdam, before 1500 - there, 1553) was an Amsterdam regent and cloth wholesaler from the 16th century. During his lifetime Amsterdam was part of the Habsburg Netherlands.

== Biography ==
=== Family ===
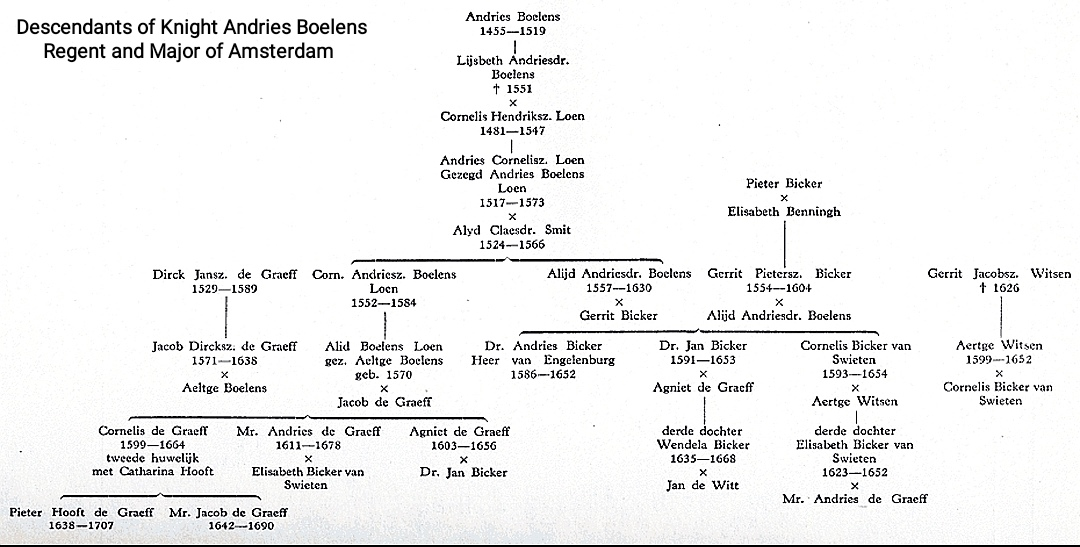
Descendants of his son Dir(c)k Jansz de Graeff and overview of the personal family relationships of the Amsterdam oligarchy between the regent-dynasties Boelens Loen, De Graeff, Bicker (van Swieten), Witsen and Johan de Witt in the Dutch Golden Age

Jan Pietersz Graeff was the son of Pieter Graeff, the first known representative of the Dutch De Graeff family. Pieter was probably a son of Wolfgang von Graben from the Von Graben family. It is uncertain which one was the first Graeff active in Amsterdam [Pieter or Jan]. Jans mother was Griet Pietersdr Berents descendant from Wouter Berensz and his wife Dieuwer Willemsz de Grebber, called Berents, of the De Grebber family, baljuws of the Waterland, and Willem Eggert, stadtholder of Holland.

Jan Pietersz Graeff married to Stein Braseman and had five sons who survived their childhood:

- Pieter Jansz Graeff (died before 1547), married Maria Jacobsdr Dobbens
- Lenaert Jansz de Graeff (about 1530–35 - before 1578), one of the leaders of the Protestant Reformation in Amsterdam, friend and deputy of Henry, Count of Bréderode, the "Grote Geus" and according to a family tradition he was ident with "Monseigneur de Graeff", from Bruges, a Watergeus (Sea beggar), privateer in the Eighty Years' War and treated as one of the leaders of the Sea beggars. His character was also used in a historical novel about his friend Van Brederode, De erfnis van De Grote Geus.
- Dirk Jansz Graeff (1532-1589), mayor of Amsterdam and one of the leaders of the Protestant Reformation
- Cornelis Pieter Jansz Graeff, he remained unmarried
- Jacob Jansz Graeff (died after 1580), he married Geertge Claes Coppensdr van Ouder Amstel, the couple had three children; Jacob Jansz had an extramarital son too:
  - Styntje (Stijntje) Jacobsdr Graeff, married to Hendrik Stuijver, Lord of Ravensberg (died 1590), and afterwards to Herman Roswinkel
  - Jan Jacobsz Graeff (born around 1570/75), founder of a family branch in Alblasserdam; father of Claes Jansz Graeff, grandfather of Albert Claesz de Graeff (born around 1620), naval officiel and rear admiral at the Admiralty of Amsterdam
  - Claes Jacobsz Graeff
  - Adriaan Jacobsz Graeff, illegitimate son who had descendants, who are said to have moved to Prussia, Saxony and Austria

=== Life ===
Jan Pietersz Graeff lived in a house on Damrak, called Huis De Keyser, which was owned by his descendants for centuries. His sons Lenaert, Dirk and Jacob ran a hardware store in the house called De Keyzershoed (Huis de Keyser) in the Niezel street, where the Imperial Crown later hung. There he ran a cloth trade, and in 1539 he was chief of the Guild of the Amsterdam cloth merchants. Graeff also traded in Antwerp, the former warehouse of English cloth. When he wanted to establish himself as a trader in North Brabant, his sons intervened to return him to Amsterdam soon. In 1542 he became a councilor and in 1543 he was appointed alderman (Schepen) of Amsterdam. Due to its political activities, the De Graeff family is one of the few patrician families to sit in government before and after the Amsterdam Alteratie of 1578.

Joost van den Vondel called Graeff in his verse Aen den hooghedelen heer Pieter de Graef, vryheer van Zuitpolsbroek, op den oorsprongk van het geslagt der graven "den braven" (the good one). Vondel also commemorated him in his Mengeldicht.
