= William II de La Marck =

Dutch pirate

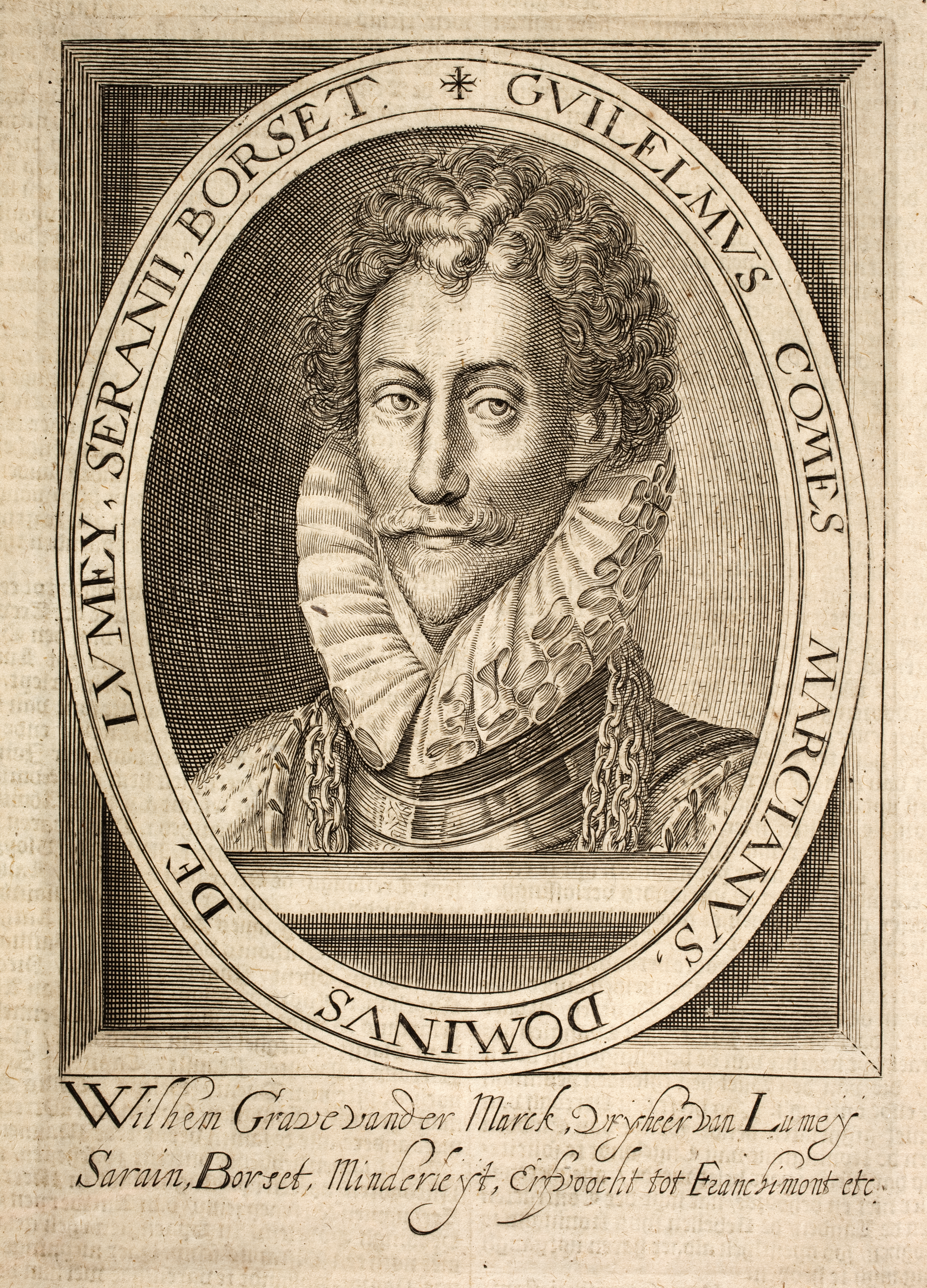
William II de la Marck

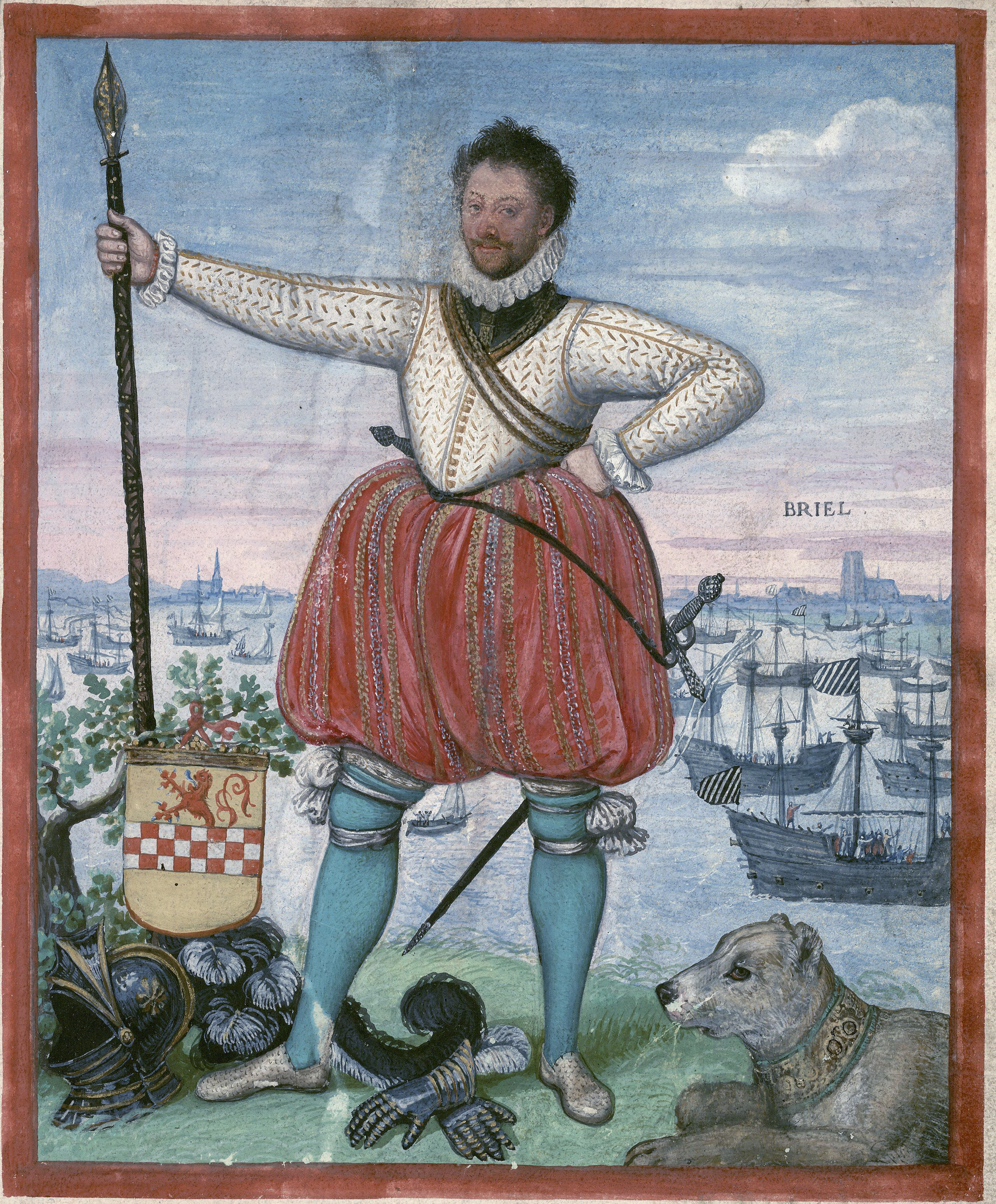
William II van der Marck Lumey

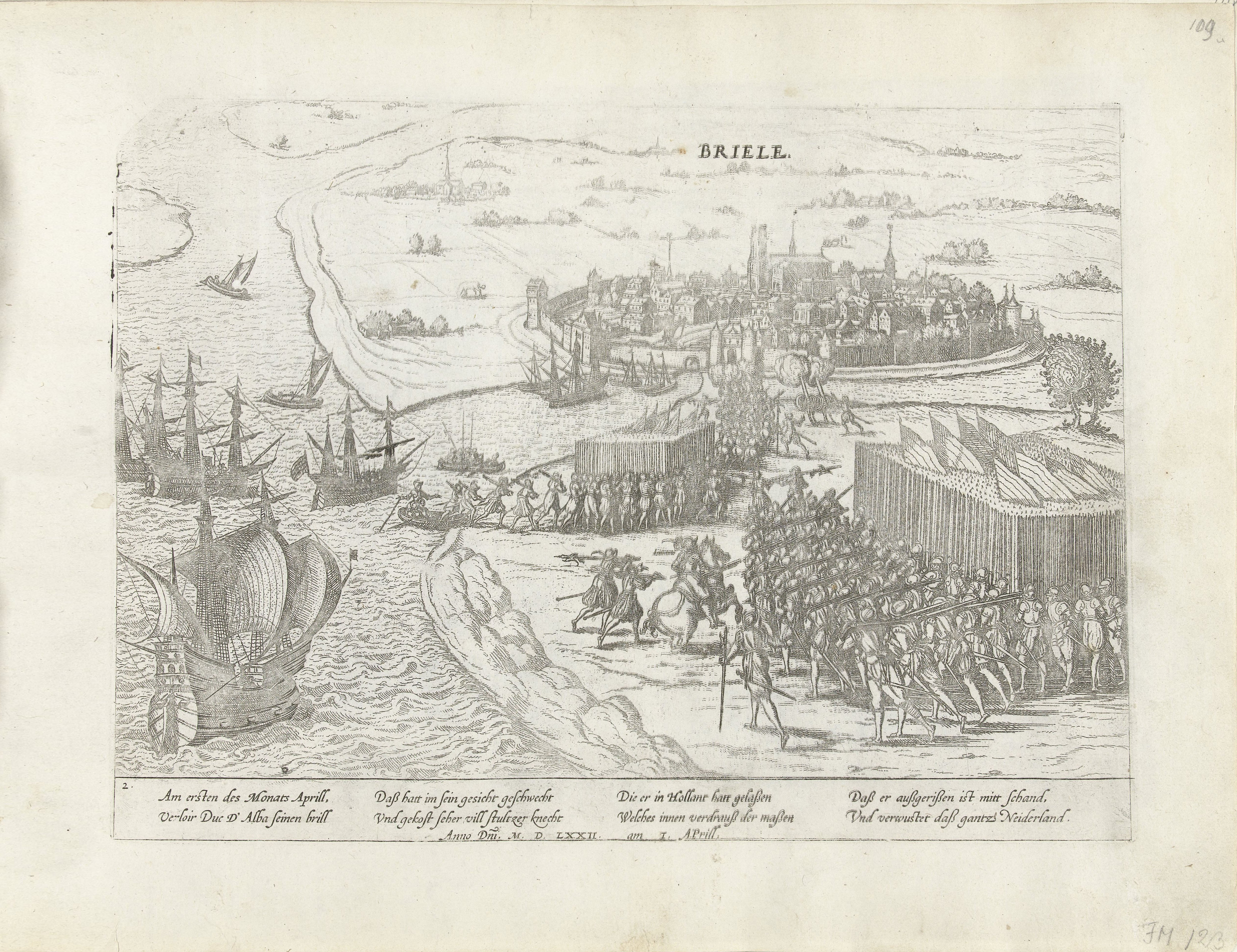
Capture of Brielle, 1 April 1572 (Frans Hogenberg)

William II de la Marck (Lummen, 1542 – Bishopric of Liège, 1 May 1578) (Dutch: Willem II van der Marck) was the Lord of Lumey and initially admiral of the Watergeuzen, the so-called 'sea beggars' who fought in the Eighty Years' War (1568–1648), together with among others William the Silent, Prince of Orange-Nassau. He was the great-grandson of an equally notorious character, baron William de la Marck, nicknamed the "wild boar of the Ardennes".

On 1 April 1572 – the day of the Capture of Brielle – the Sea Beggars were led by De la Marck, and by two of his captains, Willem Bloys van Treslong and Lenaert Jansz de Graeff. After they were expelled from England by Elizabeth I, they needed a place to shelter their 25 ships. As they sailed towards Brill, they were surprised to find out that the Spanish garrison had left in order to deal with trouble in Utrecht. On the evening of 1 April, the 600 men sacked the undefended port.

A Calvinist, who opposed Catholicism, on 9 July 1572 he had executed the Martyrs of Gorkum, 19 Dutch Catholic priests and religious who were ultimately canonized in 1865. Their crime was their refusal to abandon their belief in the Blessed Sacrament and in papal supremacy, even under torture. Lumey's action was contrary to orders he received from William the Silent. He also played a part in the murder of Cornelis Musius.

Having conquered South-Holland and controlling North-Holland and Zeeland, on 20 June 1572 Lumey was appointed stadtholder of Holland and consequently Captain General, i.e. military Commander in Chief of the conquered territories. It has never been evidenced that Lumey recognized either the authority or the seniority of the Prince of Orange, who was eventually recognized as the leader of the Low Countries' uprising against the King Philip II of Spain.

In 1576 Lumey was banned from the Netherlands, either by the States of Holland or the Prince of Orange. He is said to have participated in the lost Battle of Gembloux against the Spanish. He went back to his homeland, the Bishopric of Liège, where on 1 May 1578 he died in his residence on Mont-Saint-Martin. There are two different accounts offered for the circumstances of his death, one that he died of the bite of a mad dog or that he was poisoned while in prison.

There is evidence that the earthly remains of William van der Marck are stowed away in a casket, that is bricked up in the Arenberg-family crypt under the former Capuchin Monastery Church at Enghien, today located in Belgium.

== In popular culture ==
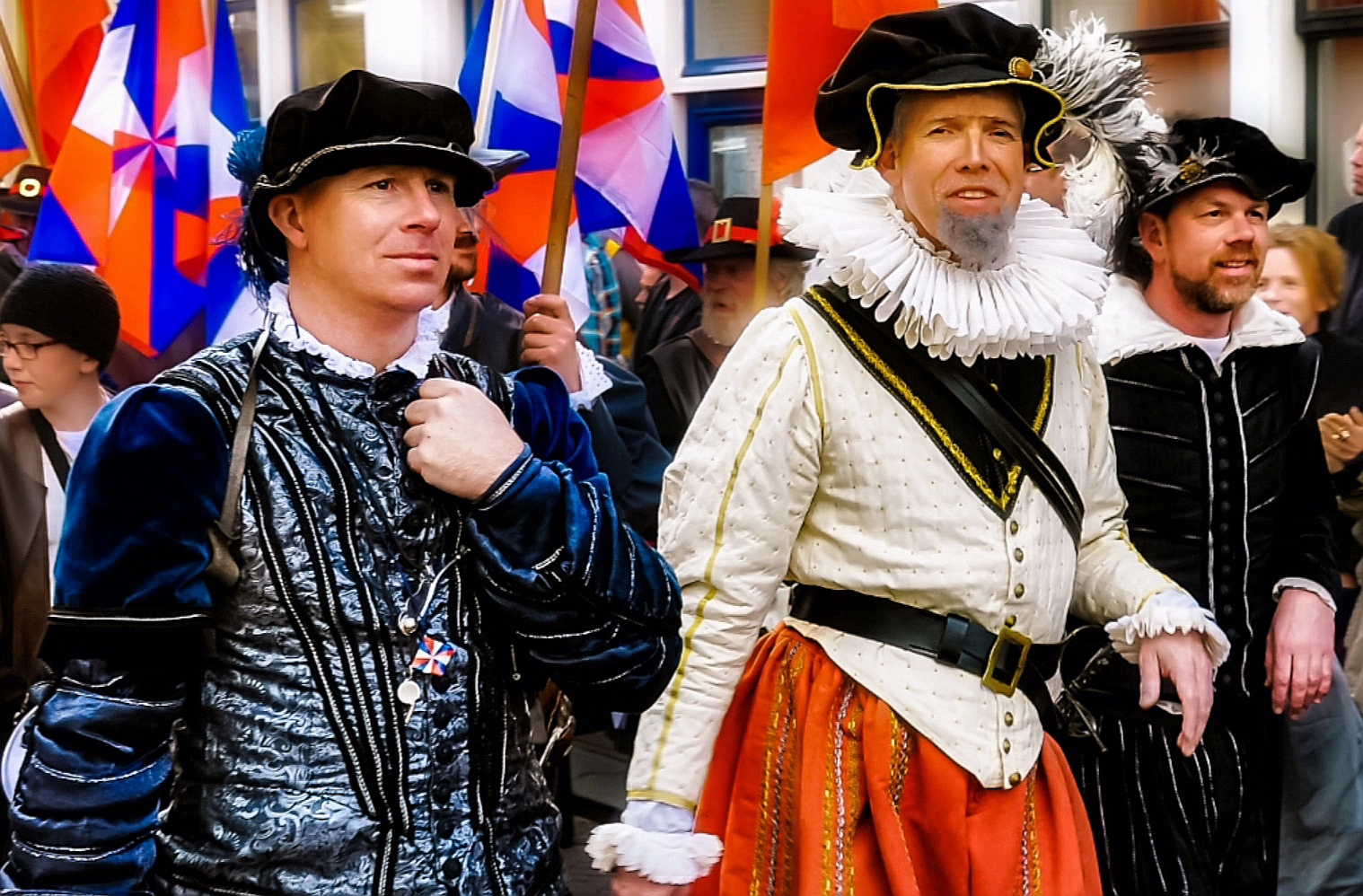
Historic parade in Den Briel to celebrate the 540th anniversary of the Capture of Brielle on April 1, 2012. The leaders of the sea beggars, William II de La Marck, Lord Lumey (middle), Willem Bloys van Treslong (left), and Lenaert Jansz de Graeff (right).

- He is featured as a recurring character in the Dutch comic series Gilles de Geus by Hanco Kolk and Peter de Wit.
- He also appears in Cecelia Holland's historical novel The Sea Beggars, which changed some of the details of his life.
- Two streets in the Geuzenwijk in Utrecht have been named after him: Lumeystraat en Van der Marckstraat. Streets in Rotterdam and The Hague have also been named after him.

== Sources ==
- Elliott, John Huxtable (2000). Europe Divided, 1559-1598 (2nd ed.). Oxford: Blackwell Publishing. ISBN 0-631-21780-0.
