= Capture of Brielle =

1572 battle of the Eighty Years' War in Brielle, the Netherlands

Coordinates: 51.9°N 4.16667°E

- Part of the Eighty Years' War
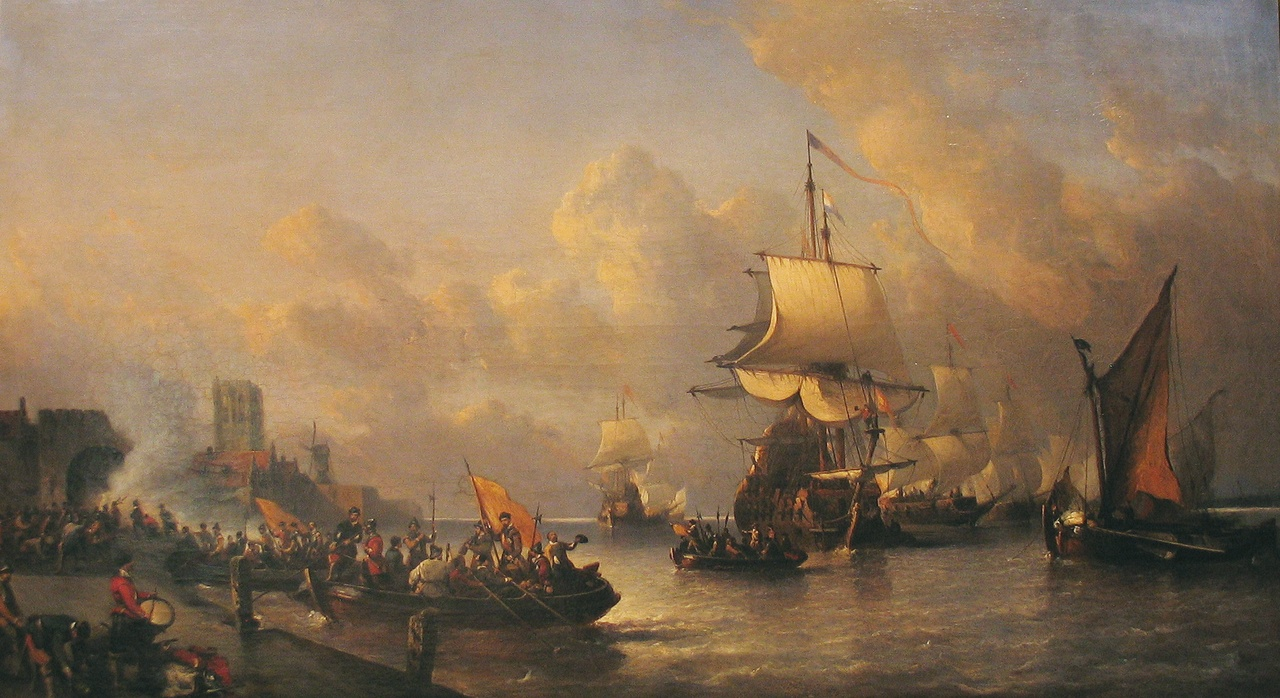
- Depiction of the capture of Den Briel, by Anthonie Waldorp
Date	April 1, 1572
Location	Brielle, the Netherlands
Result	Dutch victory

The Capture of Brielle by the Watergeuzen, on 1 April 1572 marked a turning point in the uprising of the Low Countries against Spain in the Eighty Years' War. Militarily the success was minor as the port of Brielle was undefended, but it provided the first foothold on land for the rebels at a time when the rebellion was all but crushed, and it offered the sign for a new revolt throughout the Netherlands which led to the formation of the Dutch Republic.

== Overview ==
The Watergeuzen were led by William van der Marck, Lord of Lumey, and by two of his captains, Willem Bloys van Treslong and Lenaert Jansz de Graeff. After they were expelled from England by Elizabeth I, they needed a place to shelter their 25 ships. As they sailed towards Brielle, they were surprised to find out that the Spanish garrison had left in order to deal with trouble in Utrecht. On the evening of April 1, the 600 men sacked the undefended port. As they were preparing to leave, one of the men said there was no reason they should leave where they were.

== Legacy ==
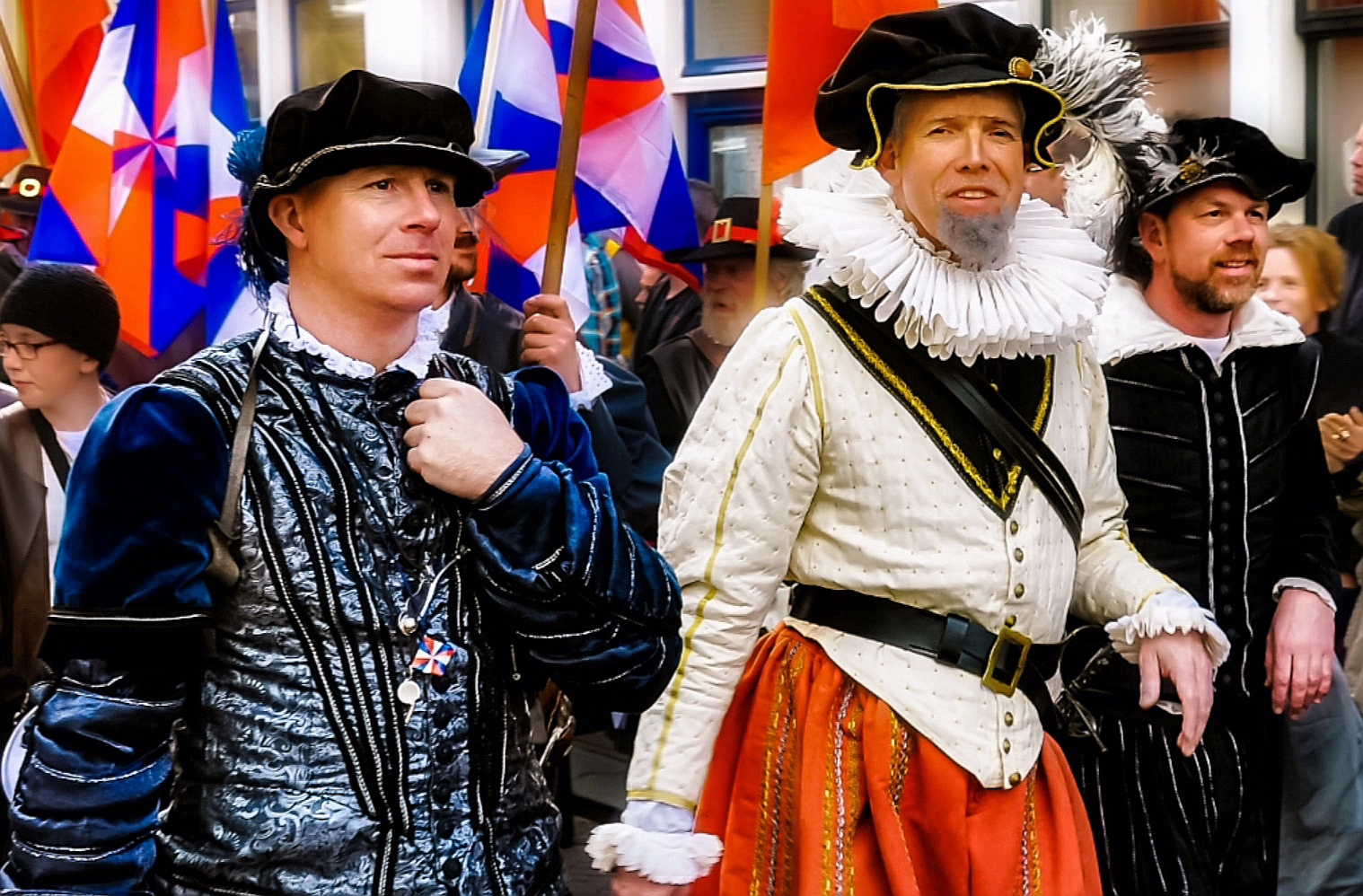
Historic parade in Den Briel to celebrate the 540th anniversary of the Capture of Brielle on April 1st, 2012. The leaders of the sea beggars, William II de La Marck, Lord Lumey (middle), Willem Bloys van Treslong (left) and Lenaert Jansz de Graeff (right).

Dutch students are taught a short rhyme to remember this event:

Op 1 april verloor Alva zijn bril,

meaning "On April 1st, Alva lost his glasses," making a pun between bril, Dutch for 'glasses', and the name of the town, Brielle or Den Briel.

"1 April" is the Dutch name for April Fools' Day.

The Capture of Brielle is still celebrated by its inhabitants each year on the first of April. Festivities include a reenactment of the battle and with a tradition called kalknacht (chalk night) where during the night before the festivities begin in earnest the mostly adolescent participants use lime chalk to write slogans and draw pictures on windows. The kalknacht tradition is frowned upon by many and the police often fine anyone caught with chalk after latex paint was used by a small number of participants which caused damage to cars, streets and houses in 2002. The kalknacht origins lie in the actions of locals who painted chalk on the doors of those citizens and officials who were loyal to Spanish rule. By doing this they targeted those houses for the Geuzen to find all people who could resist the capture.

== In literature ==
The Capture of Brielle and its aftermath forms a major part of the plot in Cecelia Holland's novel The Sea Beggars - though the depiction in the book in many ways departs from the historical facts.
