= De Grebber =

Dutch noble family

- noble and patrician family
- Parent house: Lords of Waterland
- Country: Netherlands
- Founded: after 1235
- Founder: Jacob de Grebber
- Final ruler: unknown
- Titles: knight, jonkheer
- Cadet branches: Pauw in male line, Teding van Berckout in female line

The De Grebber are considered to be one of the oldest noble families in Waterland and the city of Amsterdam.

== History ==
The origin of the family, called De Grebber from the later 13th century, is said to be in Edam and Monnickendam, where they held extensive allod possessions. Their swan coat of arms indicates her descent from the old Lords of Waterland. Jacob de Grebber (born around 1235) was the progenitor of the family and was probably the first to bear the name Grebber. His son Claes (Klaas) Jacobsz de Grebber (d. 1313) was one of the nobles who led West Friesland to independence from Count Floris V of Holland in 1296. His brother Willem Jacobsz de Grebber is mentioned in 1315 as Baljuw of Waterland. Some of his descendants also held this office. At the end of the 14th century, a line of the De Grebbers came to Amsterdam and belonged to the local patriciate. The following members were burgomasters (mayors) of the city:

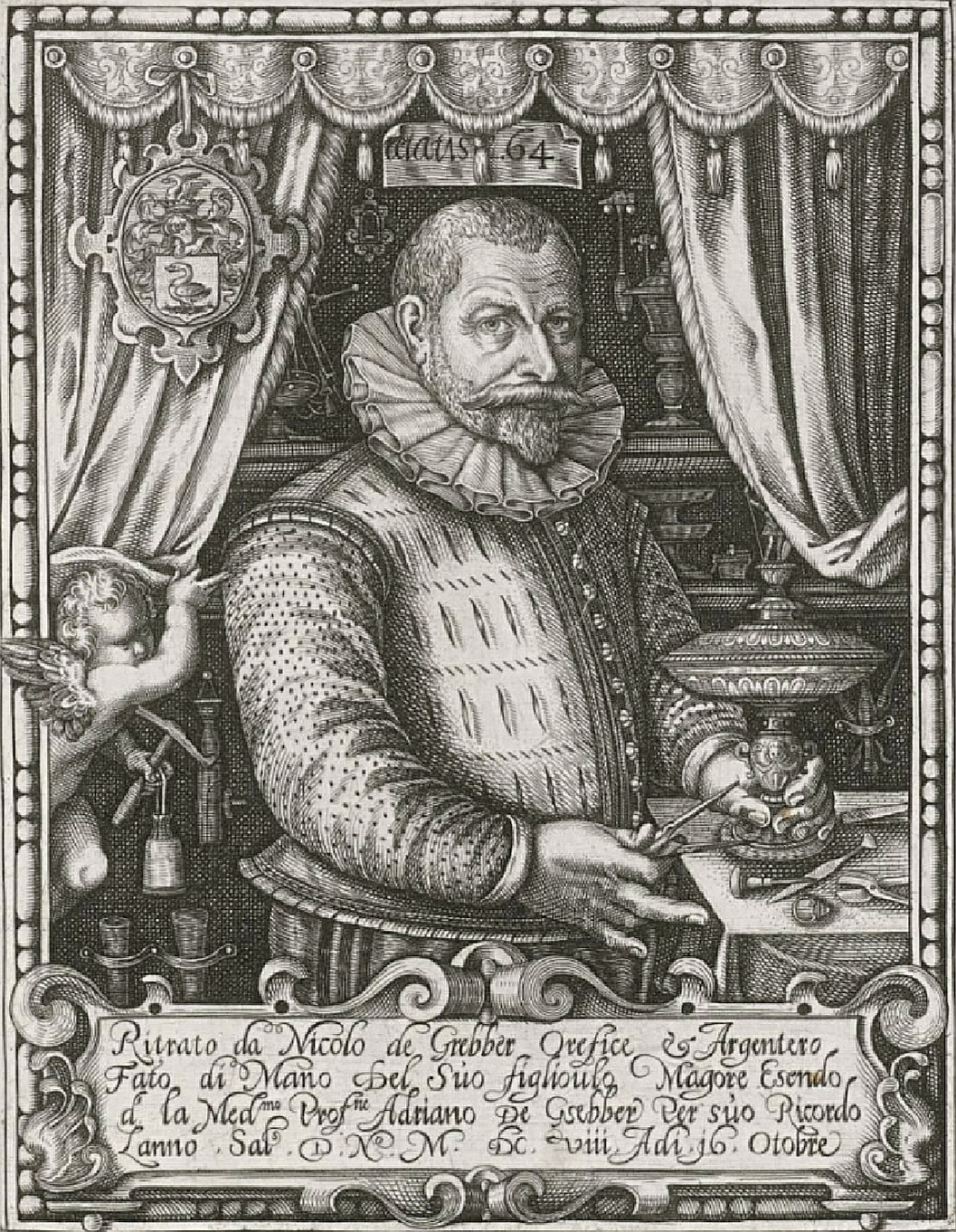
Portrait of Nicolaes Adriaensz de Grebber (born 1544), goldsmith in The Hague, by his son Adriaen de Grebber in 1604. Note: left above his coat of arms with the swan

- Gijsbert Jacobsz de Grebber, burgomaster in 1433
- Dirk de Grebber, in 1435 Schepen and in 1444 burgomaster
- Johannes de Grebber, burgomaster in 1444 (together with Dirk de Grebber)
- Willem Dircksz de Grebber de Jonge, burgomaster in 1456

The De Grebbers were also represented in the respective city governments in Haarlem, The Hague, Leiden, Delft and Alkmaar. Catharina de Grebber was the daughter of a patrician from Leiden by the name of Pieter Claeszoon de Grebber. The well-known painter Frans Pietersz de Grebber (1573–around 1649) and his children, including Pieter de Grebber and Maria de Grebber, who also worked as artists, probably came from the Haarlem line.

=== Descendants ===
The male line of the Pauw and the female line of the Teding van Berckout descended from the De Grebber. Various other families of the Amsterdam patriciate, such as the Buijck, Ruisch, De Graeff, Overlander, Banninck Cocq, and Van Hartogveld, also used the De Grebber swan in their coat of arms. The (De) Graeff family is also descended from the De Grebber family in the female line. Their progenitor Pieter Graeff (* around 1450/1460 as Peter von Graben), alleged son of the Austrian noble Wolfgang von Graben, married Griet Pietersdr Berents, who was a descendant of Jan Berents, Lord of Randenbroek (Amersfoort), the son of Wouter Berensz and his wife Dieuwer Willemsz de Grebber, called Berents.

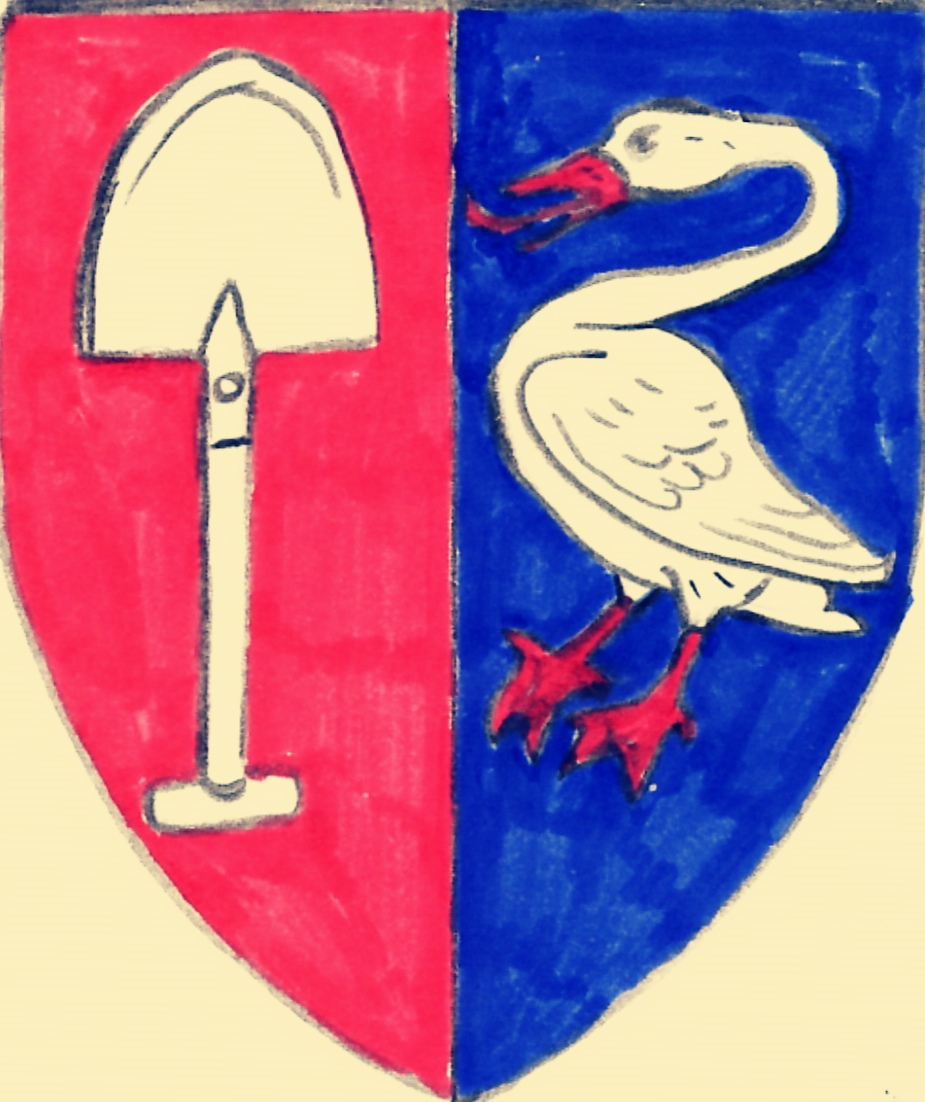
Coat of arms Graeff (ancient). The family coat of arms with the silver spade on a red (Von Graben) and silver swan on a blue background (De Grebber) was first documented in 1543 by Jan Pietersz Graeff.

Teding van Berckout family coat of arms

Pauw family coat of arms

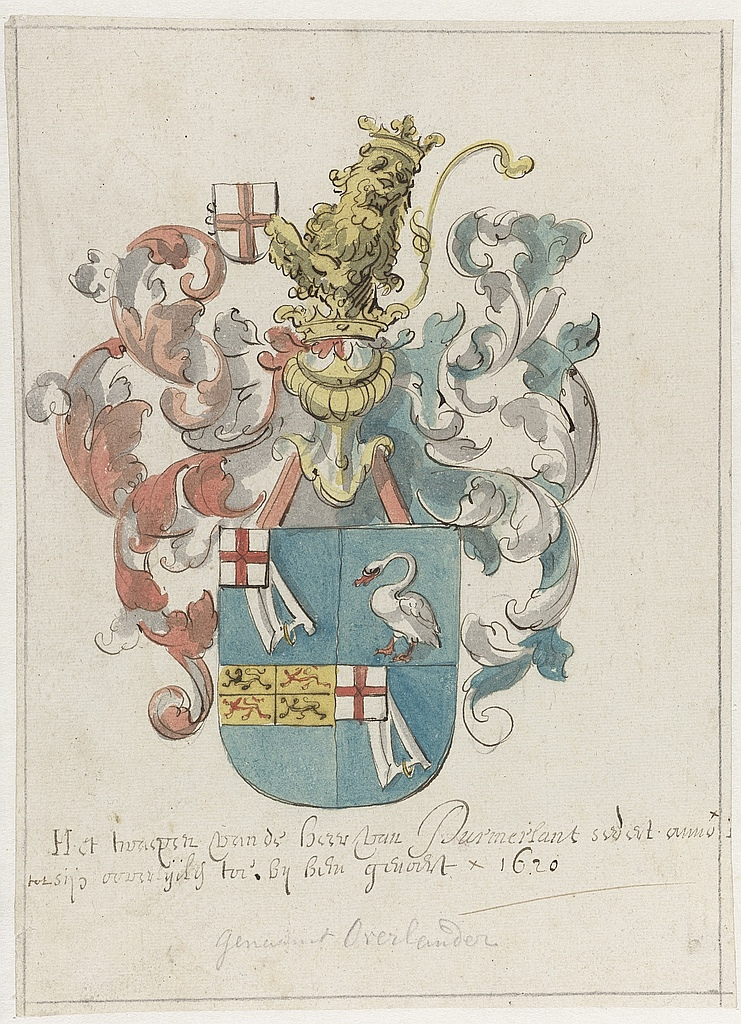
Overlander (van Purmerland) coat of arms

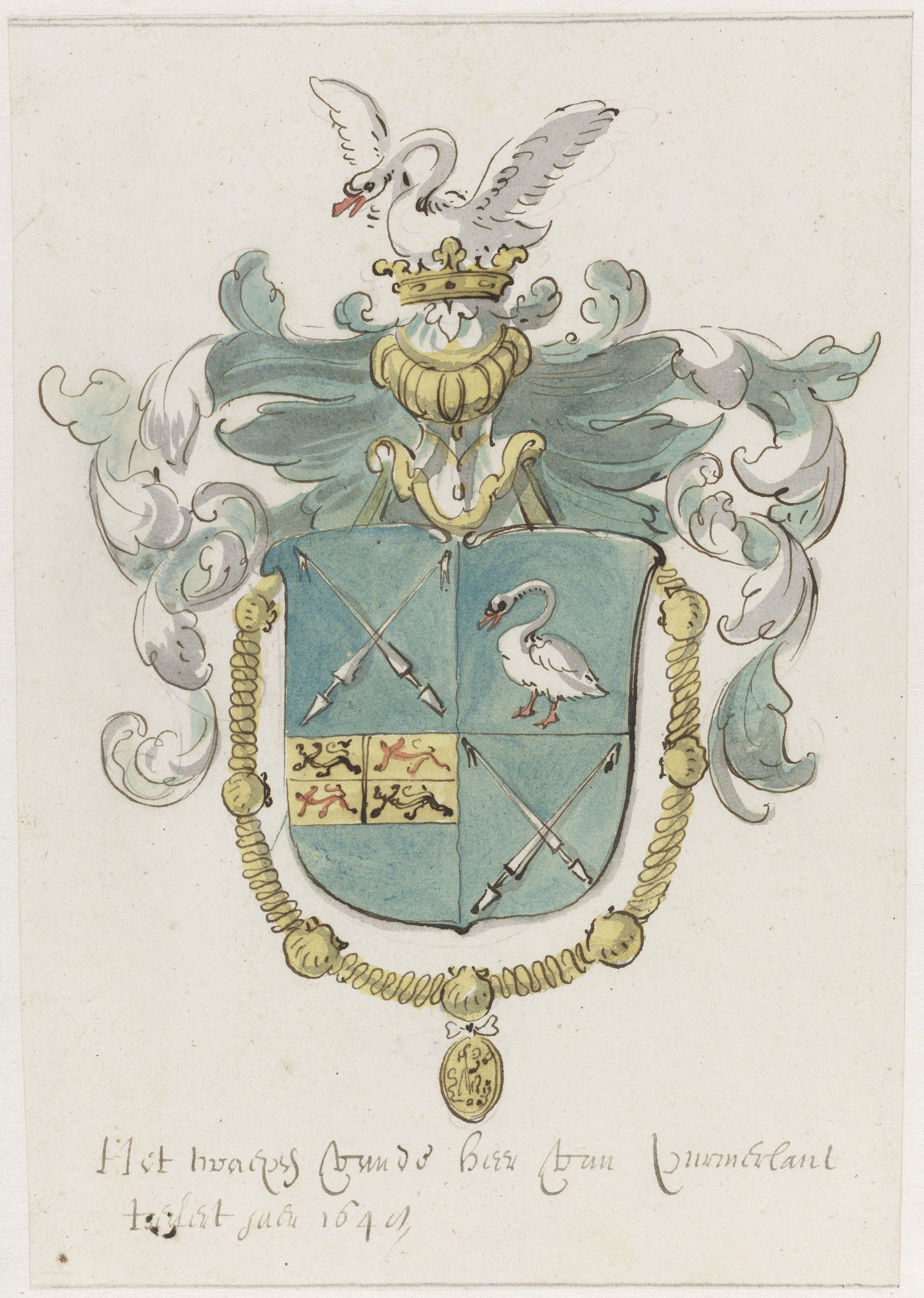
Banninck Cocq coat of arms

== Literature ==
- Genealogie Pauw, Persijn, de Jong, en Verhee. Von Thijs Postma (2014) [ online]
- Ir. J.G. Kam, in: CBG jaarboek, Teil 16: "De Grebber" (1962)
- Jhr. F. Teding van Berkhout & Mr J.W. Groesbeek, in: CBG jaarboek, Teil 9: "Tedingh van Cranenburg" (1955)
- De wapens van de magistraten der stad Amsterdam sedert 1306 tot 1672, Band 1, von Pieter Anthony Johan van den Brandeler (1890)
- Amsterdam in schetsen, p 10, von P. H. Witkamp (1869) Google book search
- De Gids – Band 2 – p 181/182 (1862) Google booksearch
