= Catharina Hooft =

Dutch art model (1618–1691)

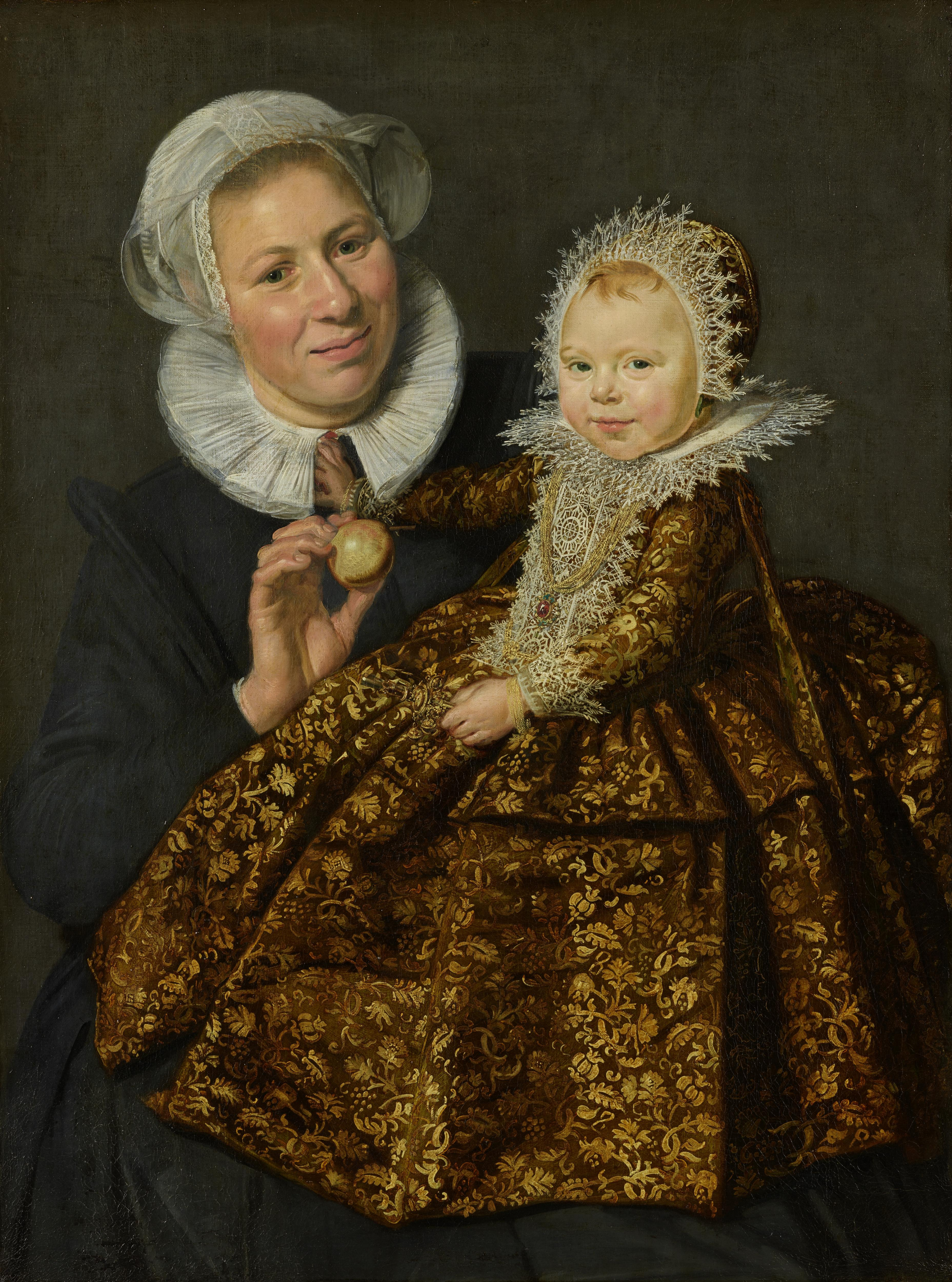
Catharina as a child, by Frans Hals. In her hand she holds a silver rattle with bells, a status symbol.

Catharina Pietersdr Hooft (28 December 1618 – 30 September 1691) was a woman of the Dutch Golden Age. She became famous at a very early age, when she was painted by Frans Hals.

At the age of sixteen she married Cornelis de Graeff, nineteen years her senior and the most powerful regent and mayor of Amsterdam. Thus she became the first lady of Soestdijk, one of the family's country houses. Catharina Hooft was also a Lady of the High and free Fief of Purmerland and Ilpendam.

== Life ==
=== Origin ===
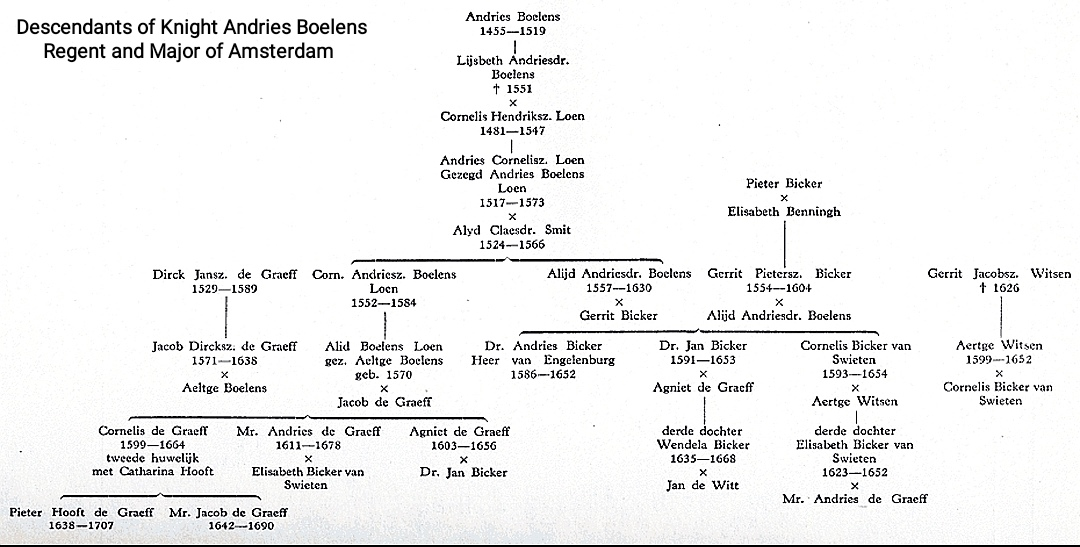
Overview of the personal family relationships of the Amsterdam oligarchy between the regent-dynasties Boelens Loen, De Graeff, Bicker (van Swieten), Witsen and Johan de Witt in the Dutch Golden Age

Catharina Hooft was born in Amsterdam. Her father, Pieter Jansz Hooft, was a nephew of the Amsterdam burgomaster Cornelis Pietersz. Hooft and related to the renowned poet P. C. Hooft of the Muiderslot, a wealthy patrician. Her mother, Geertruid Overlander (1577–1653), sister of burgomaster Volkert Overlander, was forty-one and she and her husband had given up hope of having children when Catharina was born. She was also related to Amsterdam burgomaster Frans Banning Cocq, the captain of Rembrandt van Rijn's painting The Night Watch, through her cousin Maria Overlander van Purmerland. Likewise, Netherlands great statesman Johan de Witt was her nephew. Catharina Hooft was portrayed at the age of three by Frans Hals in his famous painting Catharina Hooft with her nurse. This painting remained in the possession of the De Graeff family at Ilpenstein Castle until 1870.

=== Personality of the Golden Age ===
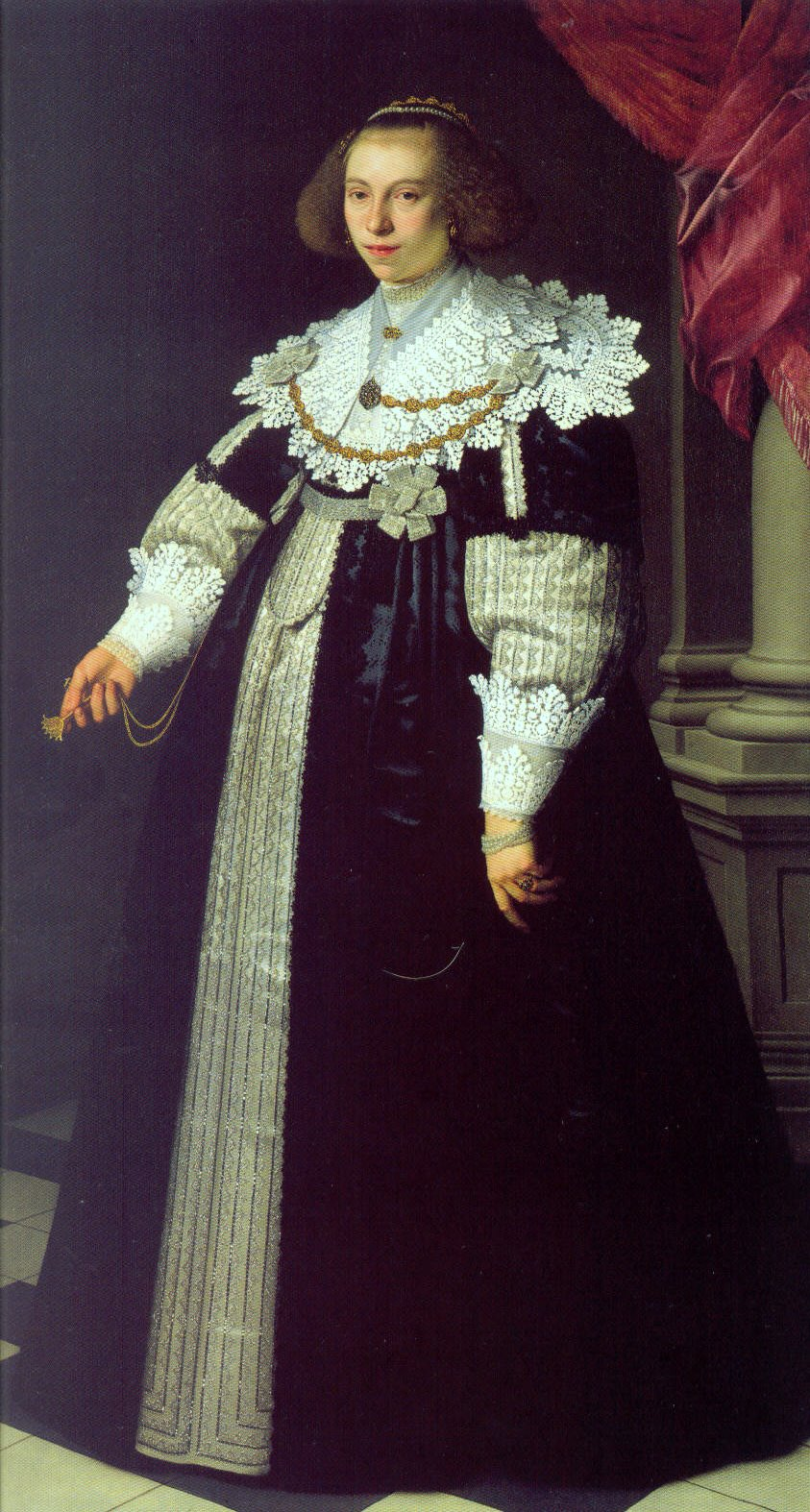
The 18-year-old Catharina Hooft, second wife of Cornelis de Graeff, by Nicolaes Eliasz. Pickenoy in the Gemäldegalerie Berlin

On 14 August 1635, at the age of sixteen, Catharina Hooft married Amsterdam regent and influential statesman Cornelis de Graeff, a widower who was nineteen years older than her, whose first wife Geertruid Overlander (1609–1634) had been Catharina's cousin (her father's sister's child). At the side of this powerful man, Catharina's transformation into one of the first women in the country took place. Together with her husband, she expresses her prominent social position as one of the country's first ladies in two life-size pendant portraits, painted in princely fashion, in black with golden, by the Amsterdam painter Nicolaes Eliasz Pickenoy. Catharina bore two sons: Pieter and Jacob de Graeff. In 1652, De Graeff had himself and his wife along with their two sons portrayed by Jan Victors as Isaac and Rebecca with their sons Jacob and Esau. This allegorical work and De Graeff's portrayal as one of the patriarchs of a people and his wife should underscore its importance.

When stadtholder William II died in 1650, ten years later followed by his wife, Cornelis de Graeff was made one of the guardians of the ten-year-old William III, the "child of state", who played in the autumn of 1661 in Graeff's country house at Soestdijk with her son's. The 1660 painting The Arrival of Cornelis de Graeff and Members of His Family at Soestdijk, His Country Estate by Jacob van Ruisdael and Thomas de Keyser shows Catharina Hooft sitting in a carriage with her husband upon their arrival at Soestdijk. Her two sons Pieter and Jacob ride the horses, and the three figures who are standing on the roadside to the right of center are her brothers-in-law Willem Schrijver, Pieter Trip and Andries de Graeff.

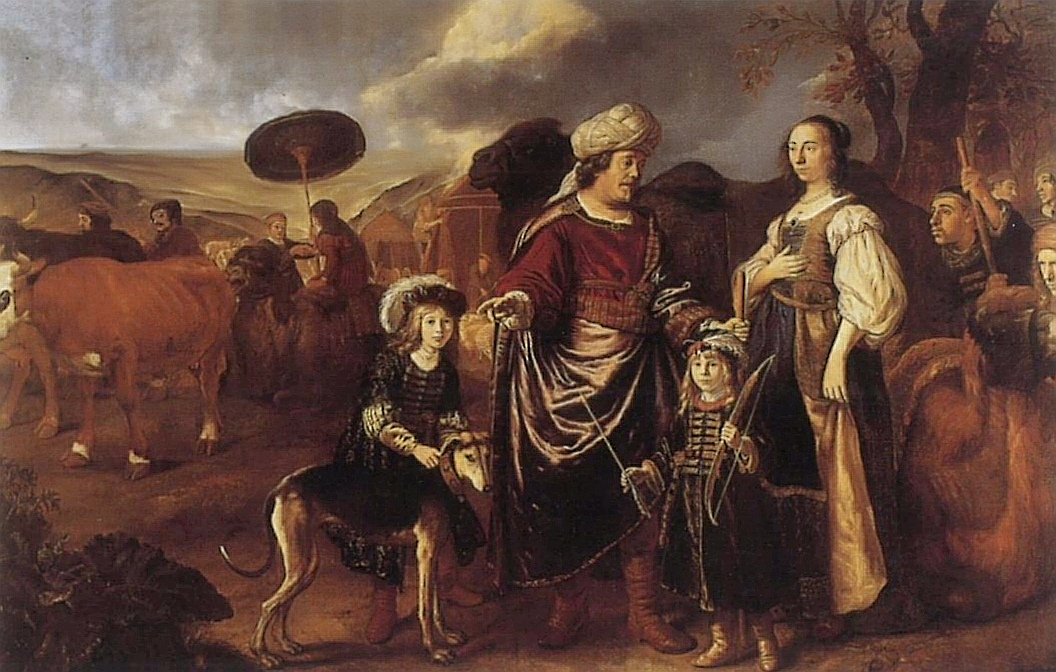
Allegory of Cornelis de Graeff as leader of his people: Cornelis de Graeff as Isaac with his wife Catharina Hooft as Rebecca with their sons Pieter and Jakob as Jacob and Esau, painted by Jan Victors (1652)

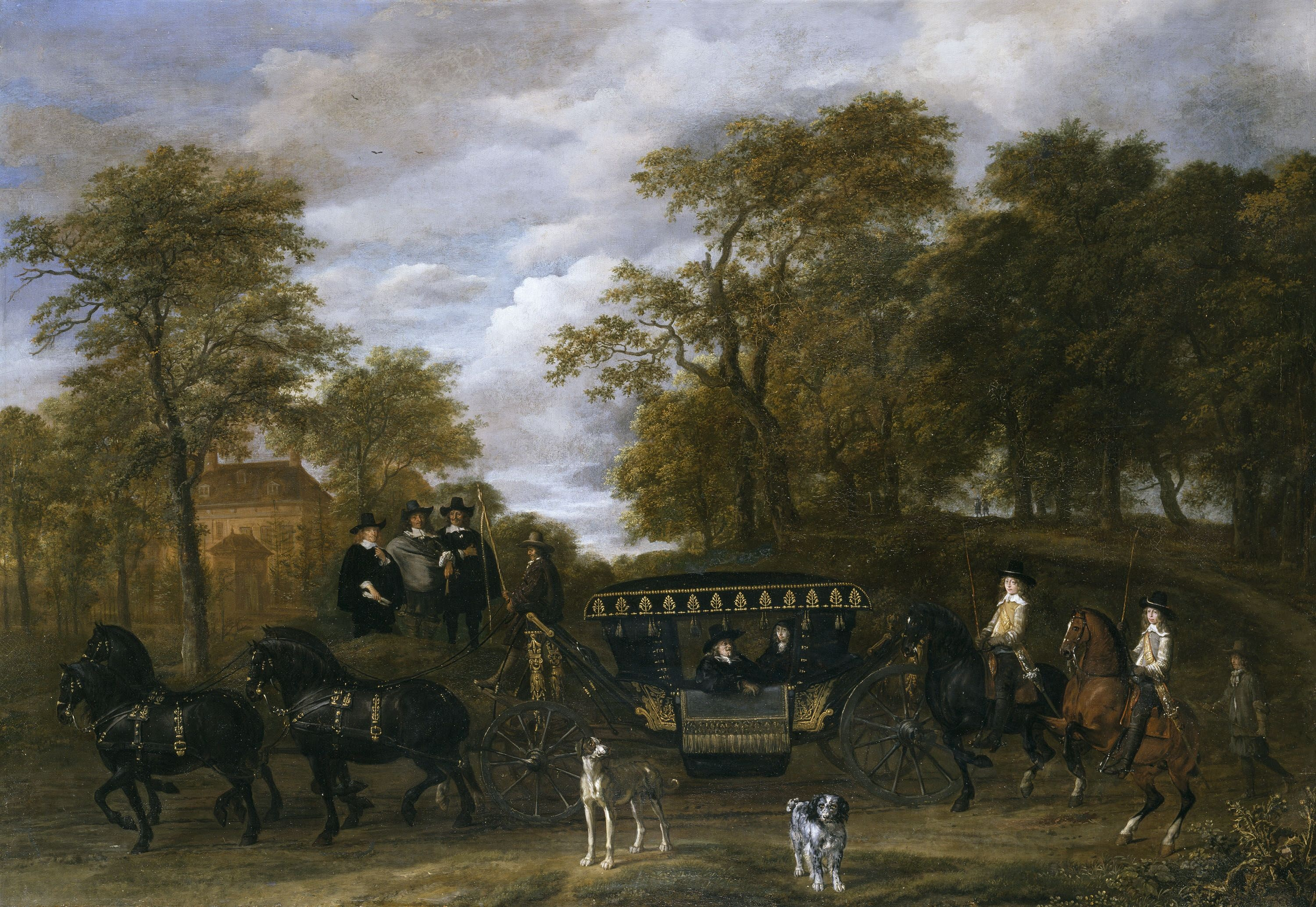
The Arrival of Cornelis de Graeff and Members of His Family at Soestdijk, His Country Estate by Jacob van Ruisdael and Thomas de Keyser, (1656/1660), National Gallery of Ireland

Opposite the De Graeffs' house Soestdijk lived the powerful anti-Orangist Bicker family, consisting of Catharina’s brother-in-law and sister-in-law and their four daughters. One of whom, Wendela Bicker, married Catharina Hooft’s nephew, Grand Pensionary Jan de Witt.

Catharina was widowed in 1664. After the sudden death of her son Jacob's first wife Maria van der Does in 1667 he began courting Anna Christina Pauw van Bennebroek. She was the only daughter of Adriaen Pauw, President of the Hof (Court) van Holland and granddaughter of former Grand Pensionary Adriaan Pauw. But since De Graeff's mother Catharina Hooft didn't like the Paauwen at all [de Paauwen gantsch niet lustte] she was against marrying a member of the Pauw regent family and even enlisted the help of her nephew Johan de Witt to prevent her son Jacob from marrying Anna Christina Pauw van Bennebroek.

In 1672 when William III. of Orange stepped out of the shadows to become General captain and stadtholder, she changed political tack and – with her sons – became a supporter of the House of Orange. William bought the De Graeff hunting lodge and its surrounding fields, the later Soestdijk Palace, from Jacob de Graeff for only 18,755 guilders. In 1678 Catharina Hooft inherited the high Lordship of Purmerland and Ilpendam from her cousin Maria Overlander van Purmerland (daughter of her maternal uncle Volkert Overlander and widow of Frans Banning Cocq), which she owned half with her son Jacob, who was also Maria's full nephew. Hooft outlived her husband by thirty years. She died in Ilpendam and was buried in Amsterdam on October 6, 1691.

=== Coat of Arms ===
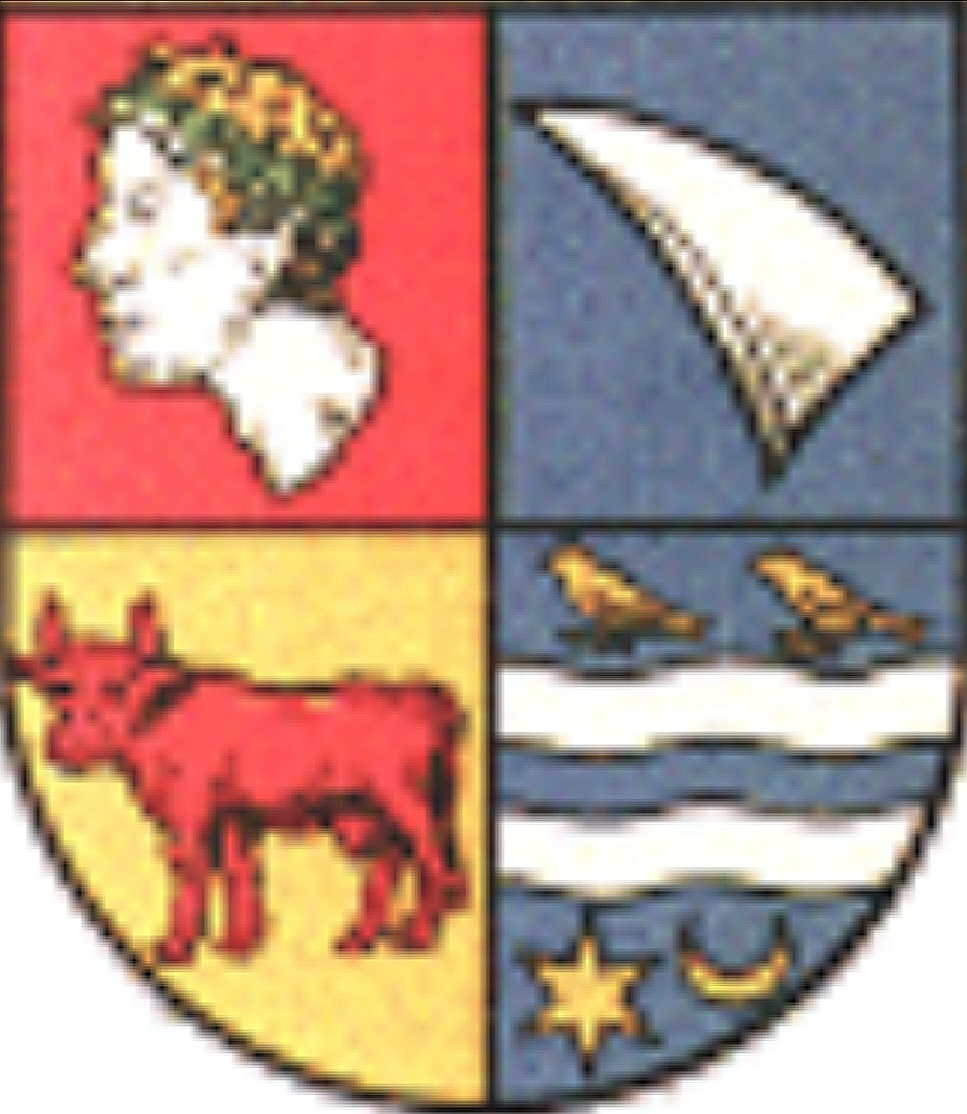
Coat of arms of the family of Catharina Hooft (coat of arms donator was her father Pieter Jansz Hooft

- Quartered: I In red, a beardless man's head of silver with golden hair, surrounded by a green laurel wreath (Hooft family); II An antique ploughshare in blue, placed obliquely to the right with the point up (Overlander family); III In gold a red cow (Lons family); IV In blue two wavy silver crossbars, accompanied from above by two gold siskins and from below on the right by a golden star (6) and on the left by a golden ear of wax (Chijs family).

Catharina Hooft House De Graeff Born: 28 December 1618 Died: 30 September 1691
Preceded by Maria Overlander van Purmerland (Widow of Frans Banning Cocq)	17th Lady of the Free and high Fief of Purmerland and Ilpendam between 1678 and 1690 together with her son Jacob de Graeff); 1678–1691	Succeeded by Pieter de Graeff

== Literature ==
- Graeff, P. de (P. de Graeff Gerritsz en Dirk de Graeff van Polsbroek) Genealogie van de familie De Graeff van Polsbroek, Amsterdam 1882.
- Bruijn, J. H. de Genealogie van het geslacht De Graeff van Polsbroek 1529/1827, met bijlagen. De Built 1962–63.
- Moelker, H. P. De heerlijkheid Purmerland en Ilpendam (1978 Purmerend)
