= Jacob de Graeff =

Dutch regent (1642–1690)

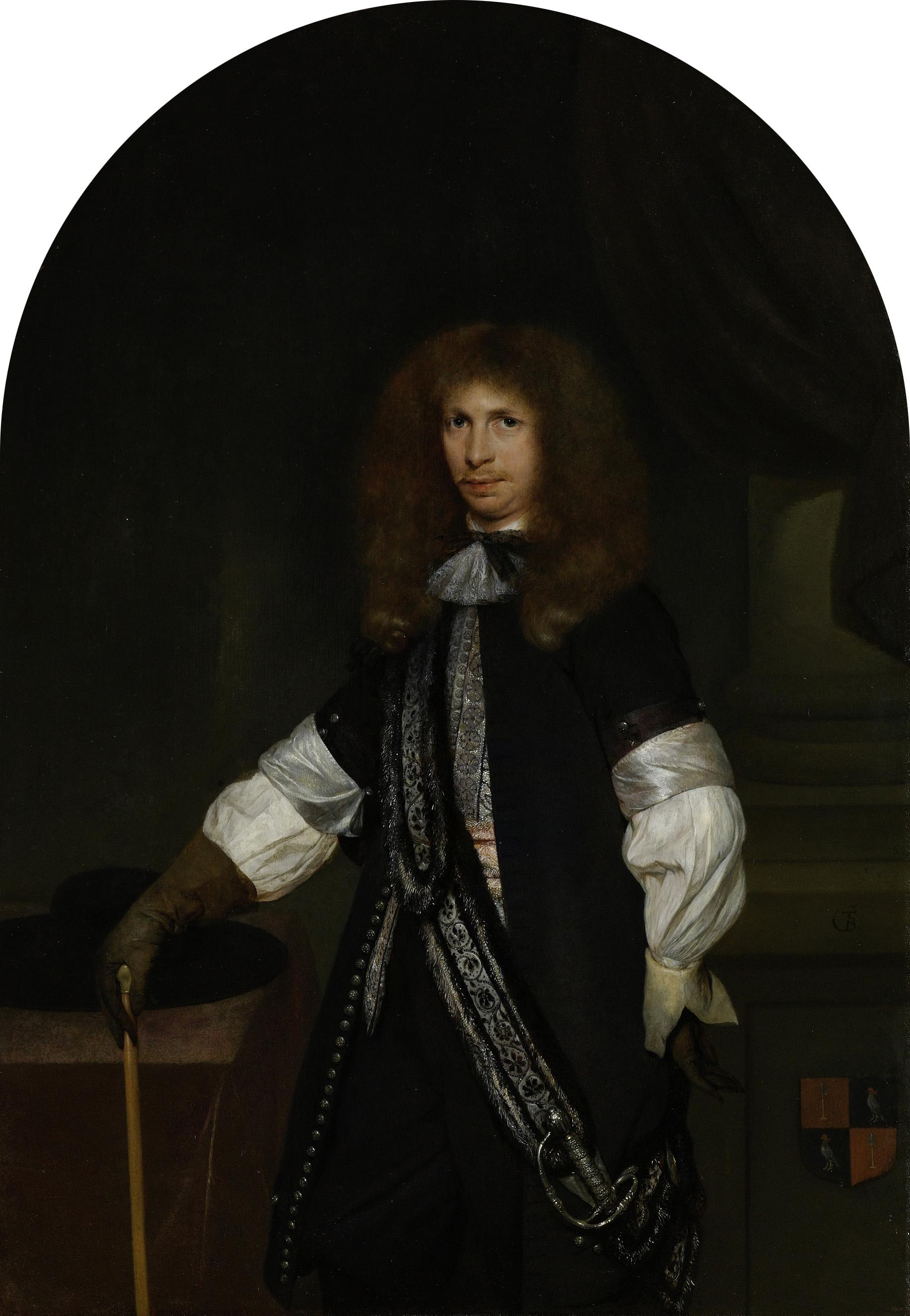
Jacob de Graeff, painted by Gerard Ter Borch (between 1670 and 1675) (1670–1681)

Jacob de Graeff (28 June 1642 in Amsterdam – 21 April 1690 ibid) was a member of the De Graeff-family from the Dutch Golden Age. He was an Amsterdam regent and held the title as 20th Free Lord of Ilpendam and Purmerland.

His political stance was characteristic of his family, on the one hand libertine and 'state oriented', republican on the other hand, if only partially, loyal to the House of Orange, the royalists. De Graeff was in intimate contact with the statesmen Johan de Witt and Willem III of Orange and the poet Joost van den Vondel.

== Biography ==
=== Origin ===
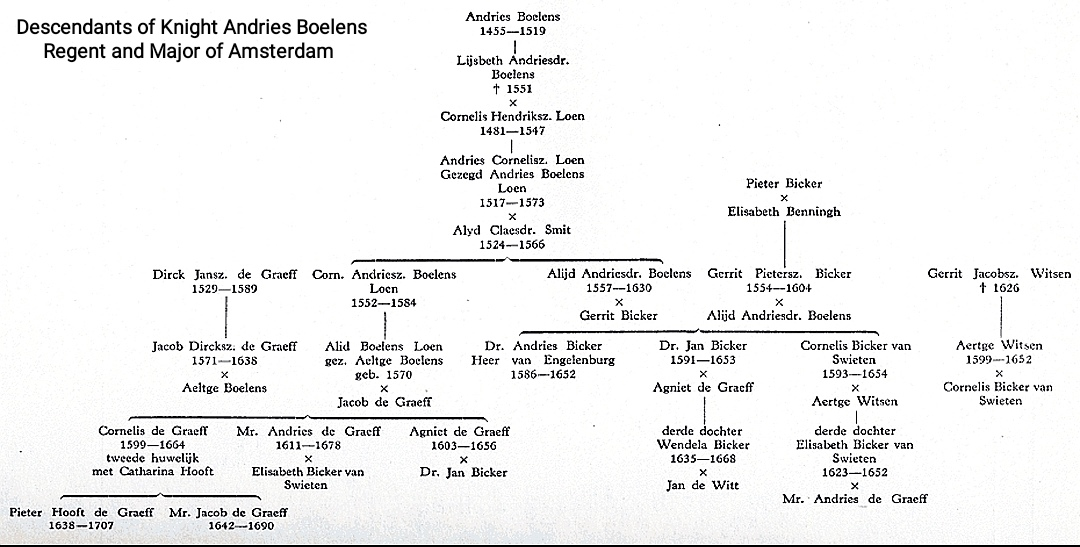
Overview of the personal family relationships of the Amsterdam oligarchy between the regent-dynasties Boelens Loen, De Graeff, Bicker (van Swieten), Witsen and Johan de Witt in the Dutch Golden Age

The De Graeff-family belonged to the ruling states oriented patriciate of the province of Holland. Both Jacob's father Cornelis de Graeff and his uncle Andries de Graeff were critical of the Orange family's influence. Together with the Republican political leader Grand Pensionary Johan de Witt, the De Graeff family strived for the abolition of stadtholderships, but also try to keep a good relationship with them and their sympathizers. They desired the full sovereignty of the individual regions in a form in which the Republic of the Seven United Netherlands was not ruled by a single person. Instead of a sovereign (or stadtholder) the political and military power was lodged with the States General and with the regents of the cities in Holland.

During the two decades the De Graeff family had a leading role in the Amsterdam administration, the city was at the peak of its political power. This period was also referred to by Republicans as the ‘Ware Vrijheid’ (True Freedom). It was the First Stadtholderless Period which lasted from 1650 to 1672. During these twenty years, the regents from Holland and in particular those of Amsterdam, controlled the republic. The city was flush with self-confidence and liked to compare itself to the famous Republic of Rome. Even without a stadtholder, things seemed to be going well for the Republic and its regents both politically and economically.

=== Coat of arms ===
Coat of arms

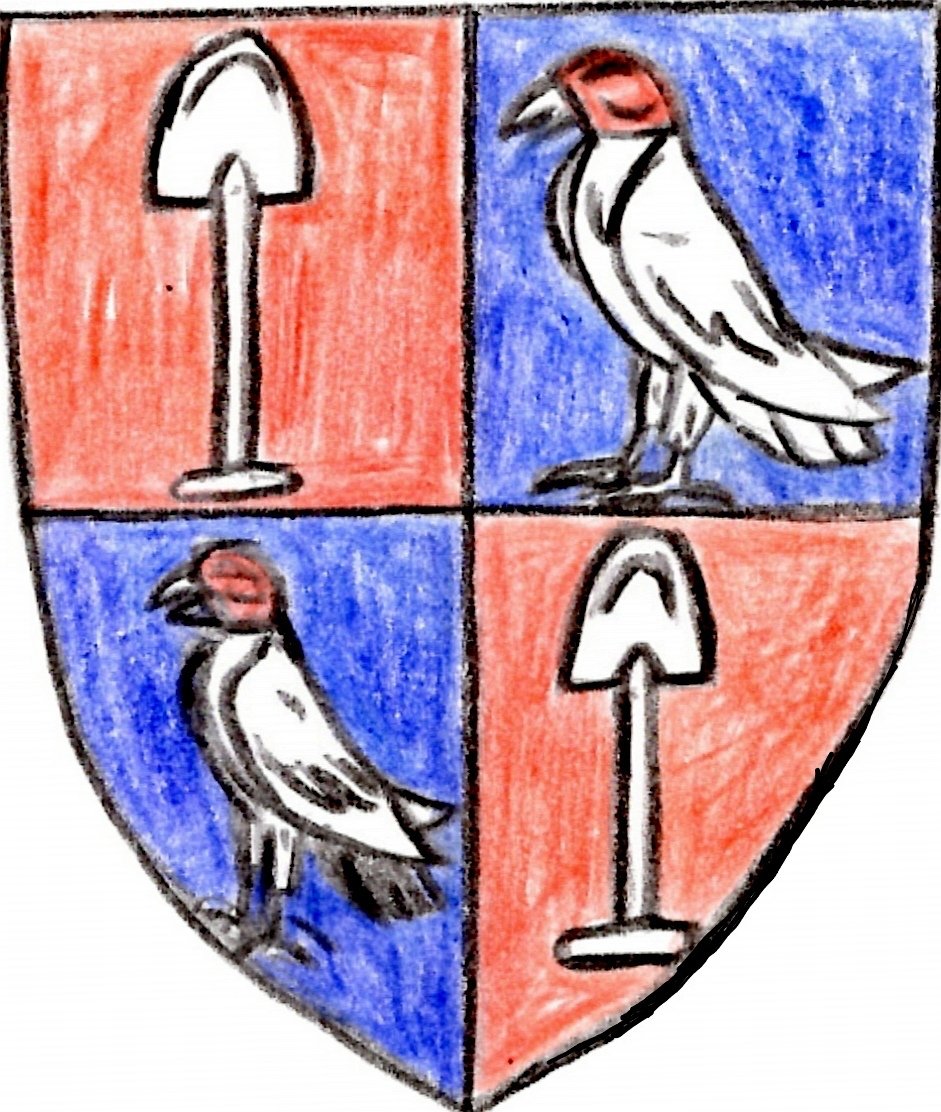
Ancient coat of arms

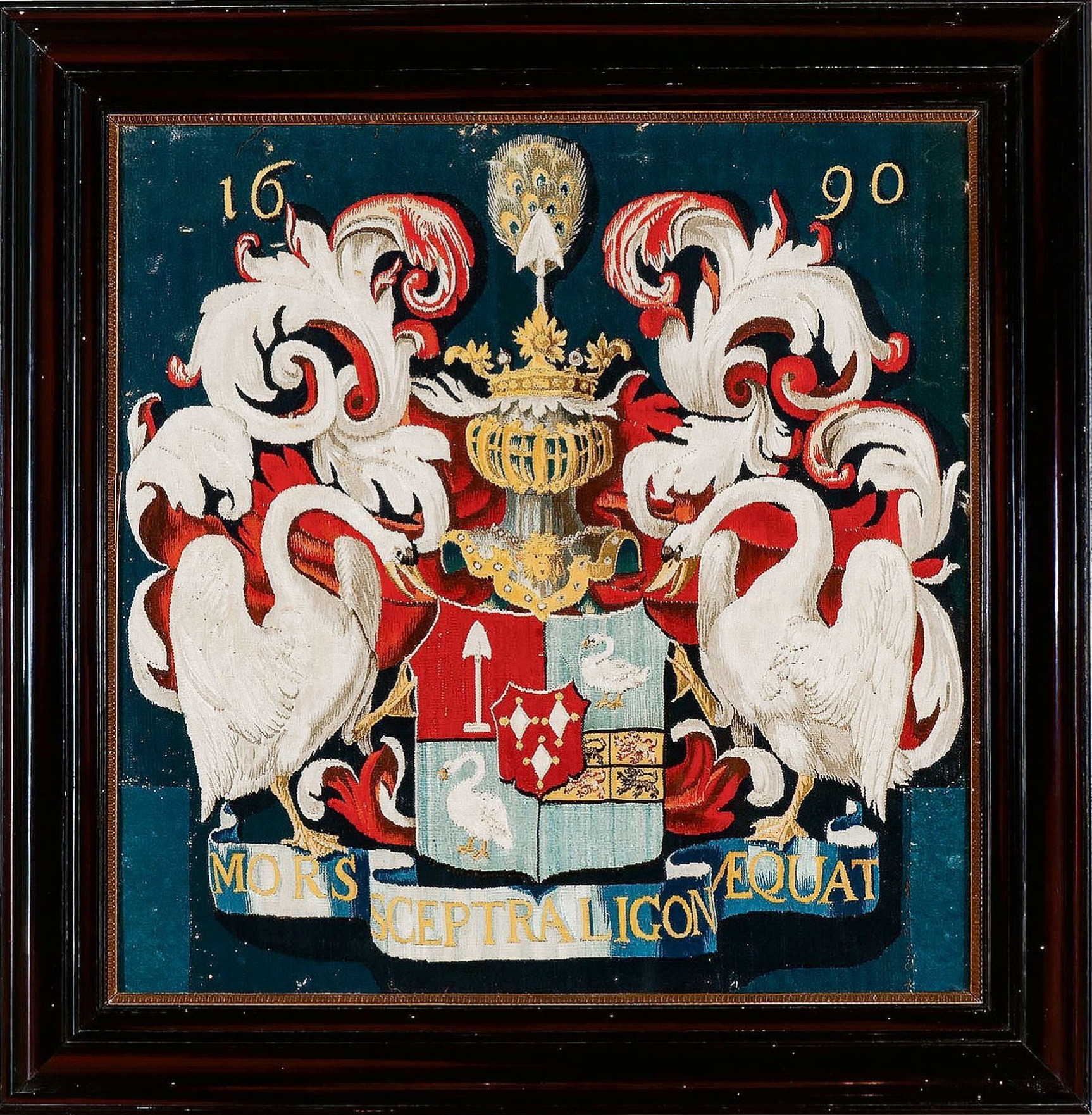
Personal coat of arms as Free Lord of Purmerland and Ilpendam (1678 creation) (Heart shield from Zuid-Polsbroek as a sign of family ownership, but not from Jacob de Graeff himself)

Jacob de Graeff's coat of arms of origin was quartered and showed the following symbols:

- field 1 (left above) the silver shovel on a red background of their paternal ancestors, the Herren von Graben
- field 2 (right above) it shows a silver falcon on a blue background. The origin of the falcon lies in the possession of the Valckeveen estate (later the Valckenburg estate) in Gooiland
- field 3 (left below), same as field 2
- field 4 (right below), same as field 1
- helmet covers in red and silver
- helm adornment shows an upright silver spade with ostrich feathers (Herren von Graben)
- motto: MORS SCEPTRA LIGONIBUS AEQUAT (DEATH MAKES SEPTRES AND HOES EQUAL)

The personal coat of arms of Jacob de Graeff of 1678 is quarterd with a heart shield and shows the following symbols:

- heart shield shows the three silver rhombuses on red (originally from the family Van Woerdern van Vliet) of the High Lordship Zuid-Polsbroek (that heart shield from Zuid-Polsbroek as a sign of family ownership, but not from Jacob de Graeff himself)
- field 1 (left above) shows the silver shovel on red of their paternal ancestors, the Herren von Graben
- field 2 (right above) shows the silver swan on blue of the Fief Vredenhof [or that one (Waterland) of their maternal ancestors, the De Grebber family
- field 3 (left below) shows the silver goose in blue of Purmerland (High Lordship Purmerland and Ilpendam)
- field 4 (right below) shows the red and black lions on gold (the arms of the County of Holland) for Ilpendam (High Lordship Purmerland and Ilpendam) above a blue area
- shield holders are two silver swans
- helmet covers in red and silver
- helm adornment shows an upright silver spade with ostrich feathers (Herren von Graben)
- motto: MORS SCEPTRA LIGONIBUS AEQUAT (DEATH MAKES SEPTRES AND HOES EQUAL)

=== Young years ===
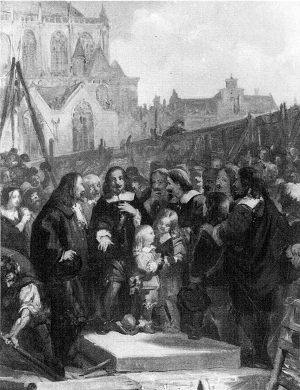
Jacob de Graeff laid the foundation stone for the new city hall on the Dam in 1648, painted by Barend Wijnveld Jr. (19th century)

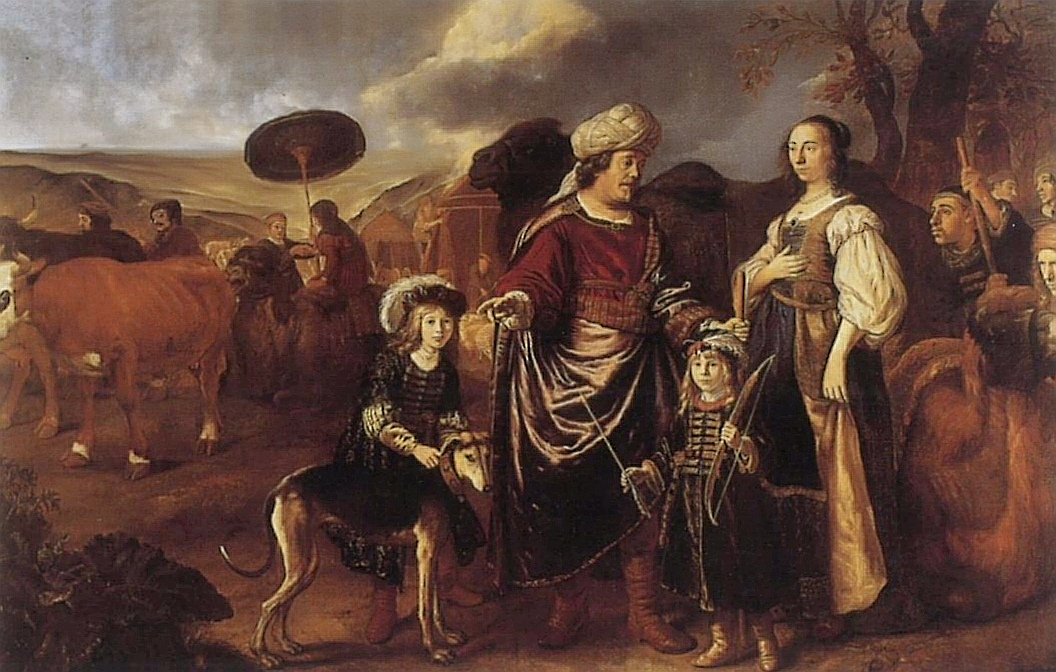
Allegory of Cornelis de Graeff as leader of his people: Cornelis de Graeff as Isaac with his wife Catharina Hooft as Rebecca with their sons Pieter and Jakob as Jacob and Esau, painted by Jan Victors (1652)

Jacob was the son of the important statesman and Amsterdam regent Cornelis de Graeff and Catharina Hooft, and the younger brother of Pieter de Graeff. The family was related to the important patrician families of Holland, so Jacob was also a close relative to the Amsterdam regent family Bicker and the cousin of Grand Pensionary Johan de Witt via his mother. Whether Jacob enjoyed his education with Johann Amos Comenius like his brother Pieter is not proven.

In 1648 Jacob, among three other young persons, laid the foundation stone for the new city hall on the Dam and Joost van den Vondel wrote the poem Bouwzang to Jacob. His shovel decorated with his coat of arms is now in the collections of Amsterdam's Rijksmuseum. The history of the origins and the year of this first laying of the stone was recorded in Latin script by Cornelis de Graeff on a black marble slab in one of the courtrooms:

On October 29, 1648, the year that ended the war that the united Low German peoples had waged on land and sea in almost all parts of the world for more than 80 years with the three powerful Philip, the kings of Spain, on land and at sea in almost all parts of the world for more than 80 years, after national freedom and freedom of belief were secured, during the government of the excellent mayors Gerb. Pancras, Jac. de Graef, Sib. Valchenier Pet. Schaep, the mayor's sons and blood relatives laid the foundation for this town hall by laying the foundation stone.

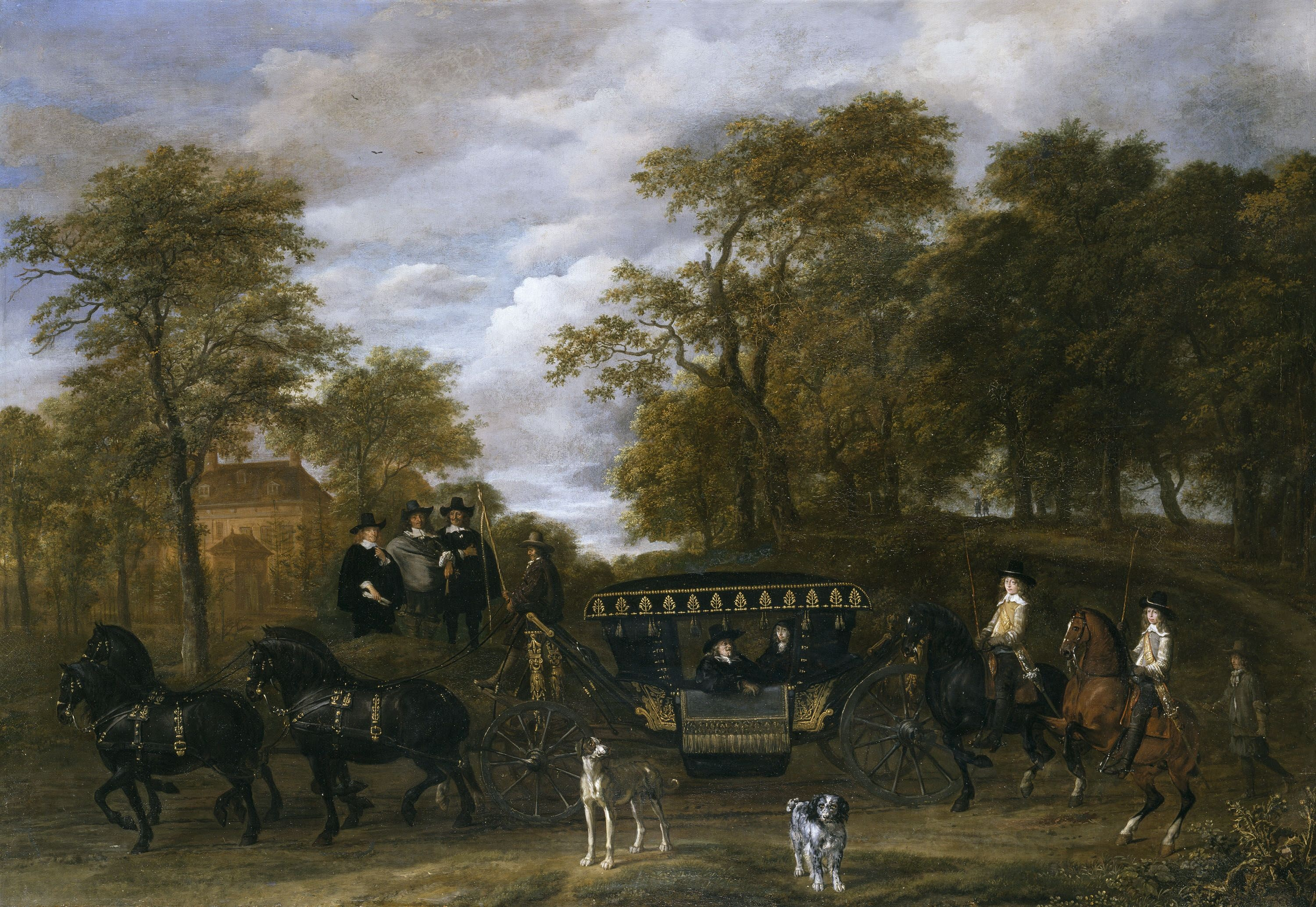
The Arrival of Cornelis de Graeff and Members of His Family at Soestdijk, His Country Estate, by Jacob van Ruisdael and Thomas de Keyser, (1656/1660), National Gallery of Ireland); Jacob at the right side

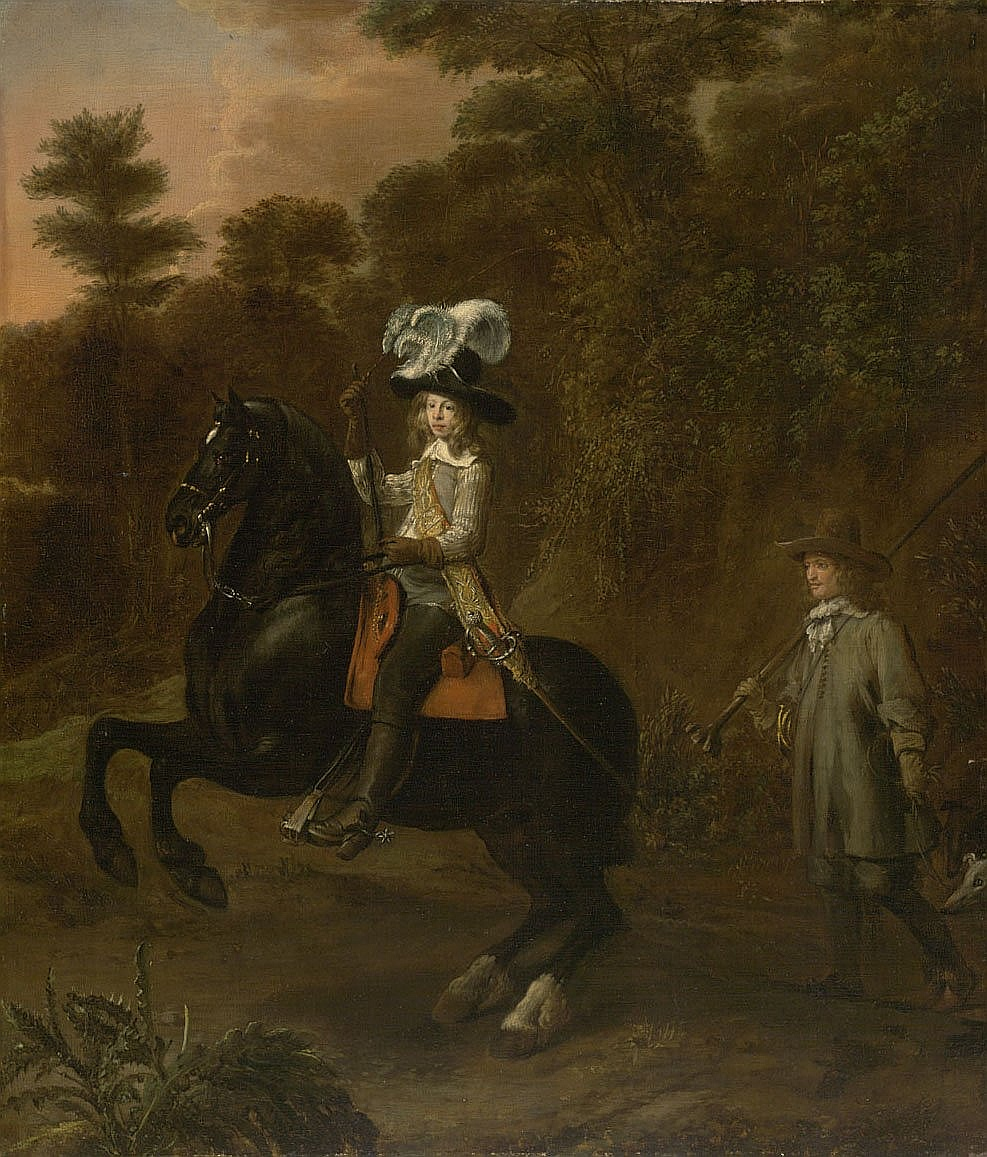
Equestrian portrait of Jacob de Graeff, copy after Thomas de Keyser (17th century), Museum of Fine Arts, Budapest

In 1660, Jacob's father Cornelis and his cousin Johan de Witt chaired a commission of the Dutch States-General, through which Cornelis de Graeff, De Witt and Gillis Valckenier became the guardians of Prince Willem III of Orange-Nassau, the child of the state, who later became King of England, Scotland and Ireland and stadtholder of the United Provinces of the Netherlands. During the summers the family spent a lot of their time at the Palace Soestdijk, and Jacob and his brother Pieter played with the young Willem at the lake and woods at Soestdijk.

When Mary Henrietta Stuart and Willem III visited Amsterdam in 1660, De Graeff was dismissed as the prince's personal escort during their stay. He was also responsible for the procession of the troops as a cornet alongside Captain Jan van Waveren and Lieutenant Dirck Tulp.

In 1661 Joost van den Vondel dedicated his Adonias to the young Jacob. After he finished his studies at the University of Harderwijk De Graeff returned to Amsterdam. In 1667 he was appointed Commissioner for sea affairs (Navy and Trade) in Amsterdam and Military Commander (of the Citizens' Guard) of Amsterdam.

Procession of the troops led by Captain Jan van Waveren, cornet Jonker Jacob de Graeff and Lieutenant Dirck Tulp on the occasion of the entry of Maria Henrietta Stuart and her son Wilhelm III. of Orange-Nassau in Amsterdam in 1660

=== De Graeff and the women ===
==== Marriage with Maria van der Does ====
In 1666 Jacob de Graeff married Maria van der Does (1649–1667), daughter of Willem Simonsz van der Does (1608–1666), legal scholar, and Catharina Hendriksdr Salomon (* 1608), who was married first to the wealthy Amsterdam patrician Jacob Bas (1603–1645). Maria was thus a rich heiress who brought him a fortune of 400,000 guilders. However, she died three months after the wedding and therefore childless. The Amsterdam patrician and chronicler Hans Bontemantel speaks in his notes about assumptions that were circulating about Jacob in Amsterdam at the time. He is said to have twice persuaded Maria on her deathbed to change her will in his favor and leave him four tons of gold as his inheritance.

==== De Graeff courts Anna Christina Pauw van Bennebroek ====
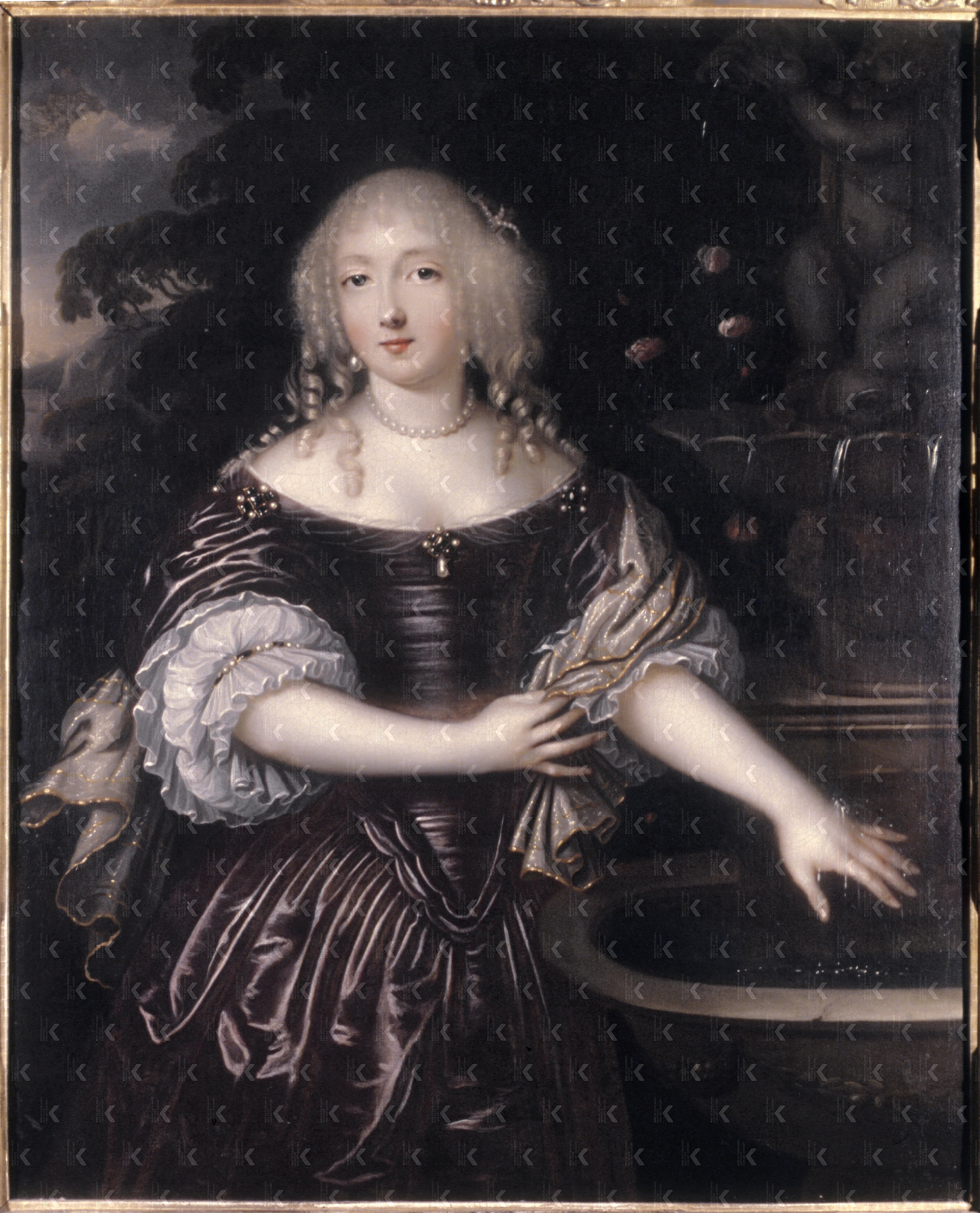
Anna Christina Pauw van Bennebroek

After Maria's death, Jacob de Graeff was probably introduced to The Hague society by his cousin, Grand pensionary Johan de Witt, at the beginning of 1669. He also introduced him to the house of Adriaen Pauw, lord of Bennebroek, President of the Hof van Holland and son of the former council pensioner Adriaan Pauw. There Jacob had fallen in love with Pauw's only daughter, Anna Christina Pauw van Bennebroek (1649–1719), the extremely beautiful and wealthy "Juffrouw van Bennebroek", who, as Adriaen's heiress, expected an immense inheritance and the title of Bennebroek. She was considered a popular marriage partner among The Hague aristocracy.

De Graeff kept this a secret from his mother, Catharina Hooft, who he knew was vehemently opposed to marrying any member of the Pauw regent family, as she disliked the Paauwen at all [de Paauwen gantsch niet lustte]. Nevertheless, he traveled to The Hague at regular intervals to court Anna Christina. He mostly slept at De Witt's, whom he had taken into his confidence. By March Jacob had received competition from Count Georg Hermann Reinhard von Wied (1640–1690), a cavalry captain in the service of the Dutch Republic. In April a third admirer of the "Juffrouw van Bennebroek" was added, Baron Nicolaas Sohier de Vermandois (1645–1690), Lord of Warmenhuijsen, Crabbendam, Oud-Poelgeest, Meresteijn. Finally, also in April, Jacob talked to his mother about his plan, which led to a heated argument between the two. Catharina Hooft threatened that if her son's marriage to Adriaen Pauw's daughter, against whom she personally had nothing, she would disinherit her son and cut him off as an unworthy member. A lively exchange of letters followed between Catharina Hooft and her older son Pieter de Graeff, who tried to calm her down, and with her nephew Johan de Witt, whom she urgently asked as a family member for help in preventing the wedding: She will never accept Anna Christina as a daughter and will no longer consider her son a child if he insists. Adriaen Pauw was now of the opinion that his daughter was by no means shy and should make her own decisions. Jacob was again in De Haag and Bennebroek in May to further his cause. The Nieuw Nederlandsch biographical woordenboek (Deel 2 from 1912) even describes the connection between Jacob and Anna Christina as an engagement. Another letter from Catharina Hooft to De Witt followed in June, urging him to use all his influence over Jacob to stop this courtship. Pieter de Graeff wrote to De Witt that his mother was unyielding and that the situation at home in Amsterdam was becoming increasingly unbearable. De Witt replied to both that he had spoken to Jacob and that his affection for Anna Christine is unbroken. Their parents also agreed unanimously, and Anna Christina herself declared that she had no dislike for this person [Jacob]. De Witt advised Jacob's mother and brother to let developments take their course. Eventually, however, Anna Christina's affection for Jacob cooled [due to Catharina Hooft's rejection?] and Jacob returned to Amsterdam. In early July, he wrote a letter thanking De Witt for the way he has always supported him. Jacob's relationship with his mother gradually improved. Anna Christina Pauw van Bennebroek finally decided on June 1 [1669] to marry Nicolaas Sohier de Vermandois. However, the wedding did not take place until October 4, 1671 in The Hague.

The historian Johan Engelbert Elias speaks in his work "De vroedschap van Amsterdam 1578–1795" of the antagonism between the regent families Pauw and De Graeff, which was clearly expressed when Jacob courted Anna Christina.

Jonkheer Cornelis Ascanius van Sypesteyn, politician and author, dedicated a short essay to this event: "Jacob de Graeff en Anna Christina Pauw van Bennebroek in 1669".

=== Rampjaar and later years ===
In early 1672 Jacob de Graeff became as a Schepen member of the Government of the City of Amsterdam. In the rampjaar 1672, after the assassination of the brothers Johan and Cornelis de Witt and the raise of the House of Orange in person of the new stadtholder William III, the republican-minded and pro-Wittianian faction of the De Graeff family included Jacob and Pieter, and their uncles old-burgomaster Andries de Graeff and burgomaster Lambert Reynst, lost their political positions.

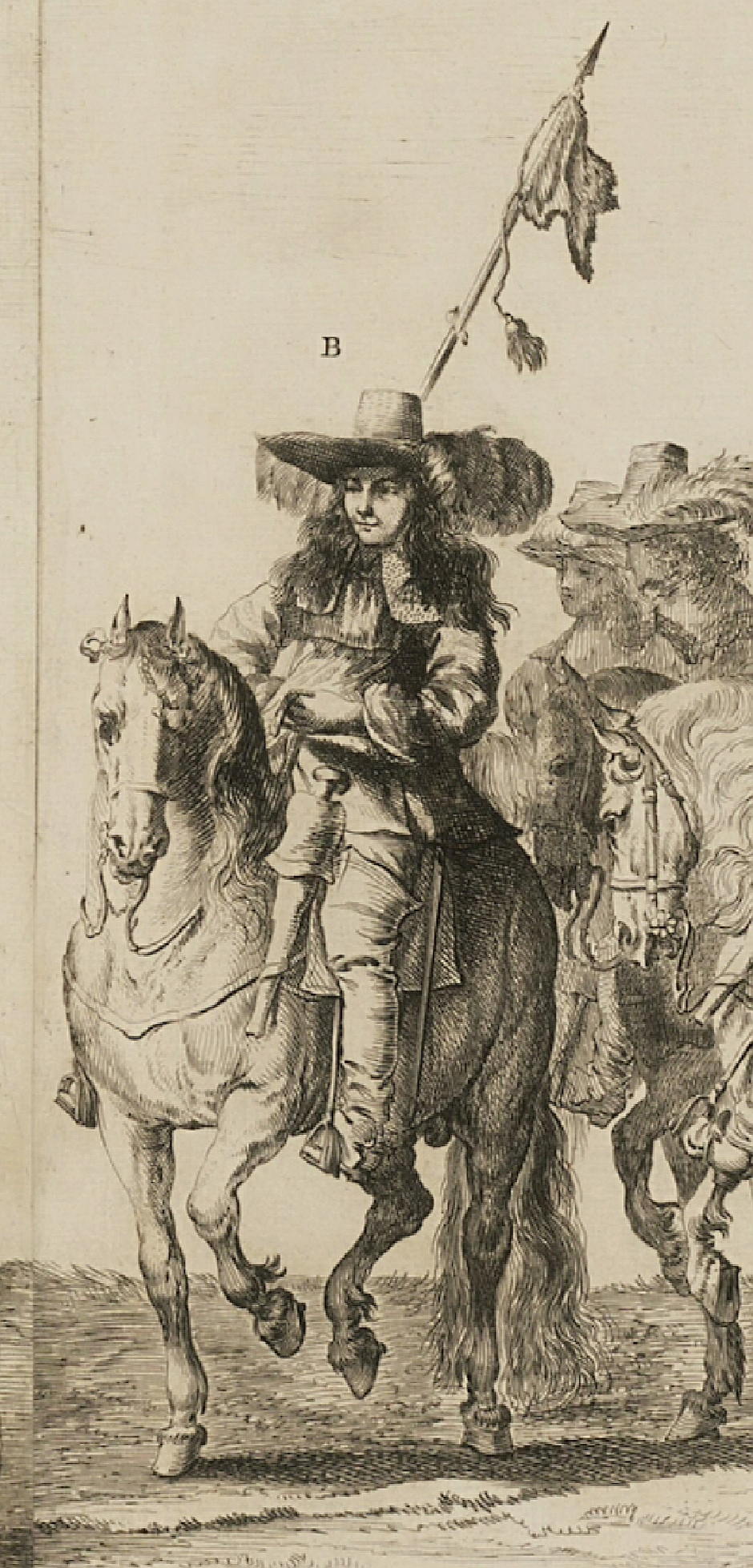
Jacob de Graeff as an officier (drawing from 1660)

After the events of the Rampjaar Jacob sought the favor of William III and Amsterdam's new powerful politician Gillis Valckenier. He belonged to that group who were formerly supporters of De Witt and opponents of the Orangers, and it was not impossible that relatives of De Witt would also receive an amnesty and could be reinstated in their posts. Since the Orangeman valued nothing more than taking part in the fight against the country's enemies, this calculation seems to have been Jacob's main motive for signing up for voluntary service together with his nephew Gerard Reynst and thus winning the favor for himself and his brother Pieter to obtain the Oranger. During 1673/74 he became one of the princes captains in the Battle of Rheinbach near Bonn. He also served as Rittmeister in the stadtholder's guard. He reported to his brother Pieter on the various occurrences of the battles in his Brieven van Jacob de Graeff, uit het leger van Prins Willem III in 1673 en '74 geschreven aan zijn broeder Pieter de Graeff, oud-schepen van Amsterdam. In 1885 these were published in Nijhoff's Bijdragen. Jacob was praised as a manly fighter in a war report from the Battle of Rheinbach. In the end, however, the Orangeman didn't recognize either him or his brother for the military service he had done. He, like his brother Pieter, was never given the favor of the stadtholder again, and the brothers remained without office for the rest of their lives. But also Wilhelm III could not rely on Jacob's intervention to fill the rebellious Amsterdam city government with his confidants.

In 1674 Jacob sold the hunting lodge and its surrounding fields, now the Soestdijk Palace, for a friendly Rice of 18,755 Guilder to William III. In the same year he owned 260, 000 guilders, a sum that makes him one of the richest people of the Dutch Golden Age. However, the historian Kees Zandvliet estimates his fortune to be much higher, since his wife Maria van der Does, who died in 1666, also bequeathed him the sum of 400,000 guilders. In 1678 Jacob inherited the high Lordship of Purmerland and Ilpendam from his full aunt Maria Overlander van Purmerland, widow of former lord Frans Banninck Cocq, which he owned half with his mother Catharina, who was also Maria's full cousin. Jacob owned the castle Ilpenstein. He died 1690 and his tomb chapel is to be found in the Oude Kerk at Amsterdam.

=== Patron of arts ===
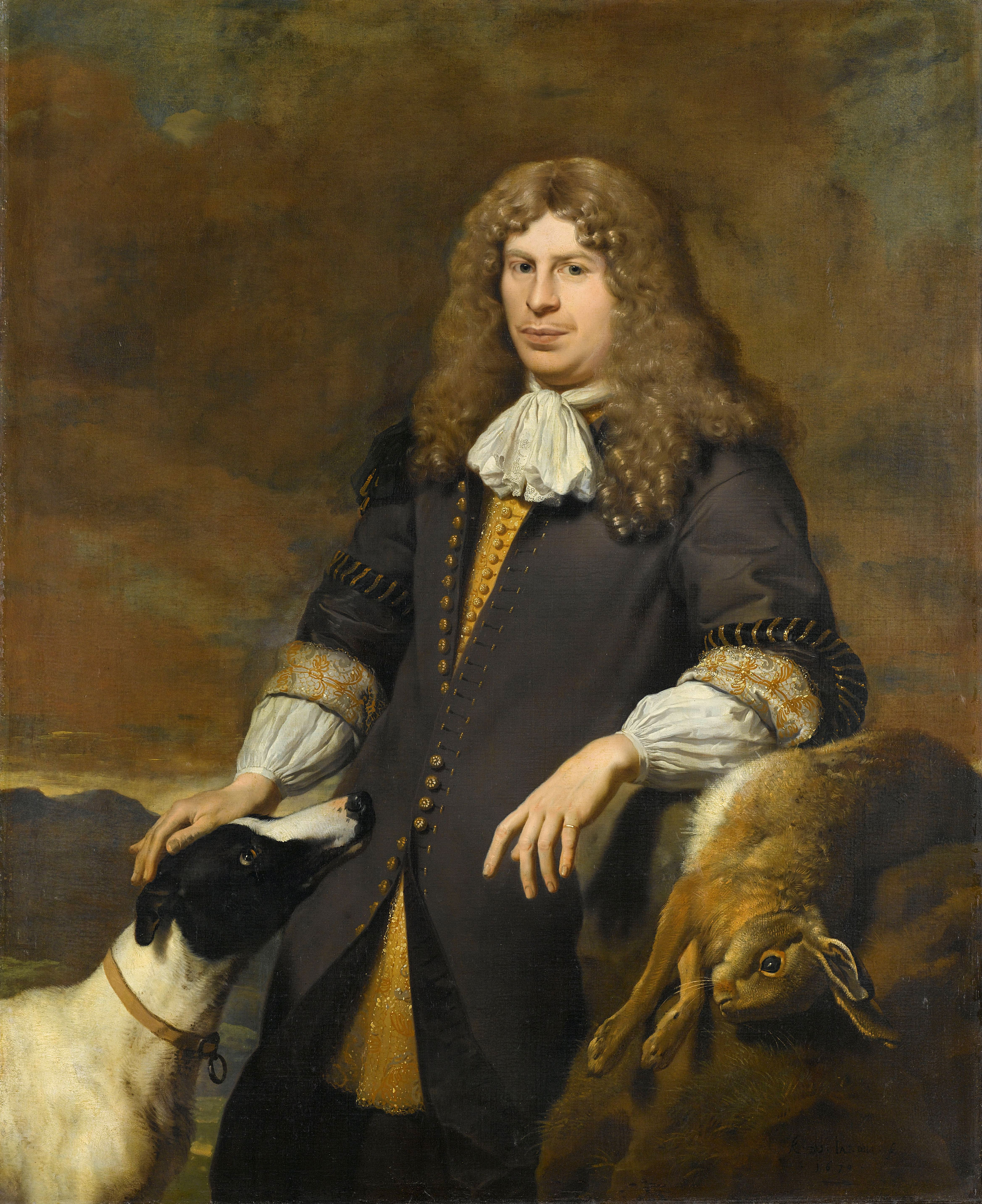
Jacob de Graeff, painted by Karel Dujardin (1670), Rijksmuseum Amsterdam

Jacob de Graeff was, like his father Cornelis and his uncle Andries, surrounded himself with art and beauty. He was an art collector and patron to some famous artist There are individual portraits of Jacob created by Gerard Ter Borch and Karel Dujardin as well as an equestrian portrait by Thomas de Keyser. In his youth, furthermore he was portrayed in 1652 together with his parents and his brother by Jan Victors as archfather Isaac and Rebekah and his children Esau and Jacob. The painting The Arrival of Cornelis de Graeff and Members of His Family at Soestdijk, His Country Estate by Jacob van Ruisdael and Thomas de Keyser shows him and his brother Pieter on their horses driving up with his parents and his uncles Willem Schrijver, Pieter Trip and Andries de Graeff in front of his father's country house in Soestdijk. Poet Joost van den Vondel dedicated some poems to him.

Later paintings:

- The 19th-century history painter Barend Wijnveld painted Jacob at the laying of the foundation stone for Amsterdam's Op den Dam town house.
- In 2007, Austrian artist Matthias Laurenz Gräff, a distant descendant of De Graeff, used Ter Borch's painting of Jacob in his painting "Im herbstlichen Wald" (In the autumnal Forest) as part of his diploma thesis.
- In 2018 the American artist Kehinde Wiley created a new version of the portrait of Ter Borch.

== Literature ==
- Elias, Johan E. (1903–1905) De vroedschap van Amsterdam, 1578–1795, Haarlem (herdruk 1963, uitgeverij Israël, Amsterdam)
- Zandvliet, Kees (2006) De 250 rijksten van de Gouden Eeuw: kapitaal, macht, familie en levensstijl, p. 97, uitgeverij Nieuw Amsterdam, Amsterdam, ISBN 90-8689-006-7
- Moelker, H.P. (1978) De heerlijkheid Purmerland en Ilpendam, p. 158–166, uitgeverij Nooy, Purmerend (2e druk)
- Graeff, P. DE (P. Gerritsz de Graeff en Dirk de Graeff van Polsbroek) Genealogie van de familie De Graeff van Polsbroek, Amsterdam 1882
- Bruijn, J. H. DE Genealogie van het geslacht De Graeff van Polsbroek 1529/1827

Jacob de Graeff House De Graeff Born: 28 June 1642 Died: 21 April 1690
Preceded by Maria Overlander van Purmerland	18th Lord of the Free and high Fief of Purmerland and Ilpendam (together with his mother Catharina Hooft); 1678–1690	Succeeded by Catharina Hooft (1690) and Pieter de Graeff
