= Lordship of Purmerend, Purmerland and Ilpendam =

High Lordship of Purmerend and Purmerland / High Lordship of Purmerland and Ilpendam Hoge heerlijkheid Purmerend en Purmerland / Hoge heerlijkheid Purmerland en Ilpendam
- 1410 / 1618–1923
- Status: Vassal of Dutch Republic
- Capital: Purmerend, after 1622 Ilpenstein
- Government: Lordship
- Lords
- Historical era: Middle Ages
  - Lordship founded: 1410
  - Fiefdom of Holland: 1410 / 1618
  - Disestablished: 1923

The Free or high Lordship of Purmerend and Purmerland and after 1618 Purmerland and Ilpendam (Dutch: "vrije of hoge heerlijkheid") was a type of local jurisdiction with many rights.

== History ==
=== Purmerend and Purmerland ===
As a free or high Lordship Purmerend - Purmerland - Ilpendam itself was an Allod in the province Holland. In 1410 the Lordship "Purmerend and Purmerland" was founded for Willem Eggert, the advisor of William II, Duke of Bavaria, count of Holland. In 1572 the Lordship was taken by the States of Holland.

=== Purmerland and Ilpendam ===
In 1618 the new Lordship was re-established under the name "Purmerland and Ilpendam". Since 1678 the heerlijkheid was a possession of the prominent family De Graeff from Amsterdam. When the French introduced the municipal system in the Netherlands, the rights of the heerlijkheid were largely abolished, although the heerlijkheid itself existed until the early 20th century.

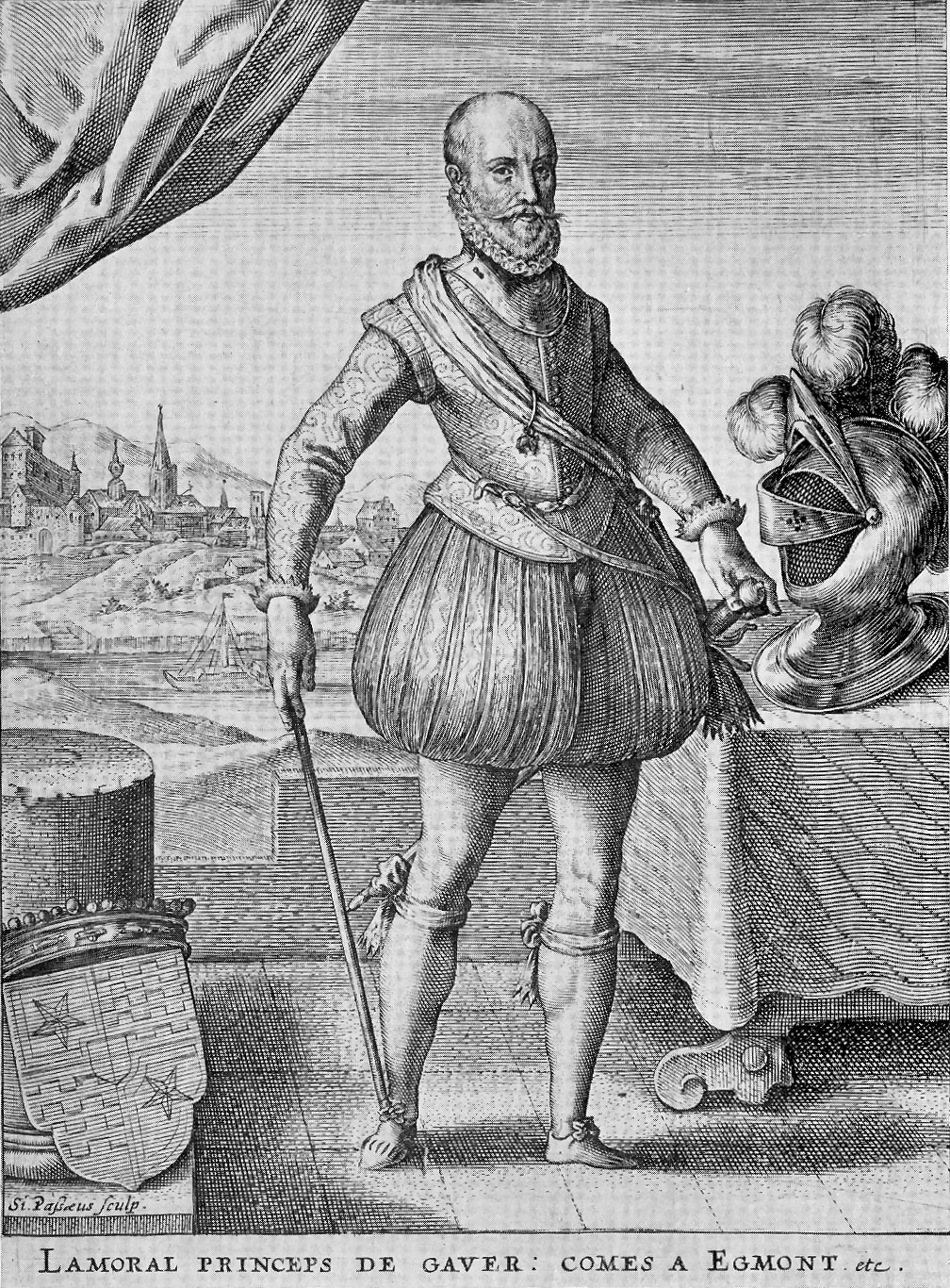
Count Lamoraal van Egmont

Frans Banning Cocq (with a red sash) in Rembrandt's Night Watch

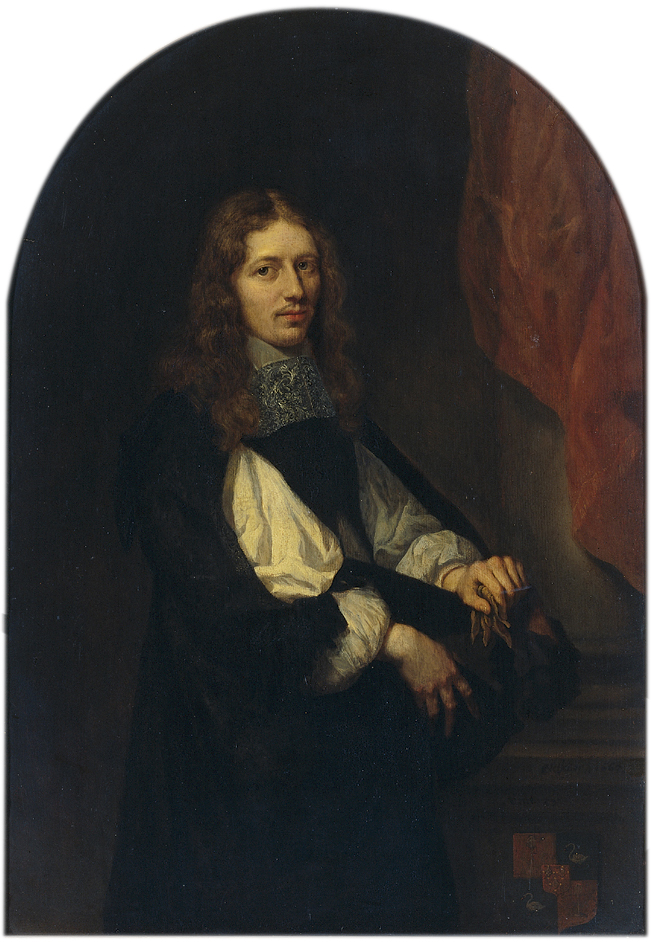
Pieter de Graeff by Caspar Netscher, Rijksmuseum Amsterdam (1663)

== Lords ==
=== Purmerend and Purmerland ===
==== Eggert ====
- (1410–1417) Willem Eggert
- (1417-14??) Jan Eggert
- (14??-14??) Jan, Bastard of Bavaria
- (14??-1430) Willem Eggert II
- (1430–1440) Gerrit van Zijl

==== Montfoort ====
- (1440–1449) Johan van Montfoort
- (1449-14??) Hendrik van Montfoort
- (14??-1483) Jan van Montfoort. Confiscated after the Second Utrecht Civil War

==== Egmont ====
- (1483-1516) John III van Egmont
- (1516-1528) John IV van Egmont
- (1528–1541) Charles I van Egmont
- (1541–1568) Lamoraal van Egmont
- (1568–1582) Philip van Egmont

==== States of Holland ====
- (1582–1618) States of Holland

=== Purmerland and Ilpendam ===
==== Overlander, Hooft, Banning Cocq ====
- (1618–1630) Volkert Overlander
- (1630–1636) Geertruid Hooft
- (1636–1655) Frans Banning Cocq
- (1655–1678) Maria Overlander van Purmerland

==== De Graeff ====
- (1678–1691) Catharina Hooft
- (1678–1690) Jacob de Graeff
- (1690–1707) Pieter de Graeff
- (1707–1719) Cornelis de Graeff II.
- (1719–1752) Gerrit de Graeff I
- (1721-1721) Agneta de Graeff
- (1752–1766) Elisabeth Lestevenon
- (1766–1811) Gerrit de Graeff II.
- (1811–1814) Gerrit de Graeff (III.) van Zuid-Polsbroek
- (1814–1870) Gerrit de Graeff (IV) van Zuid-Polsbroek

==== De Jong ====
- (1870–1912) Dirk de Jongh

== See also ==
- Ilpenstein Castle

== Literature / External links ==
- Moelker, H.P., De heerlijkheid Purmerland en Ilpendam (1978 Purmerend) (nl)
- Bruijn, J.H. De, E.A. De bewoners van het Kasteel Ilpenstein en hun nakomelingen, 1827 - 1957. Ilpendam 1958 (nl)
- Groesbeek, J.W., Middeleeuwse kastelen van Noord-Holland. Hun bewoners en bewogen geschiedenis (1981 Rijswijk) page 276-283 (nl)
- Google -Booksearch: Het heerlijk veer van Ilpendam (nl)
- The Free and high Lordship of (Purmerend), Purmerland and Ilpendam at Heren van Holland (nl)
- G. van Enst Koning Het Huis te Ilpendam en deszelfs voornaamste Bezitters (nl)
