= Wybrand de Geest =

Dutch portrait painter (1592 – c. 1661)

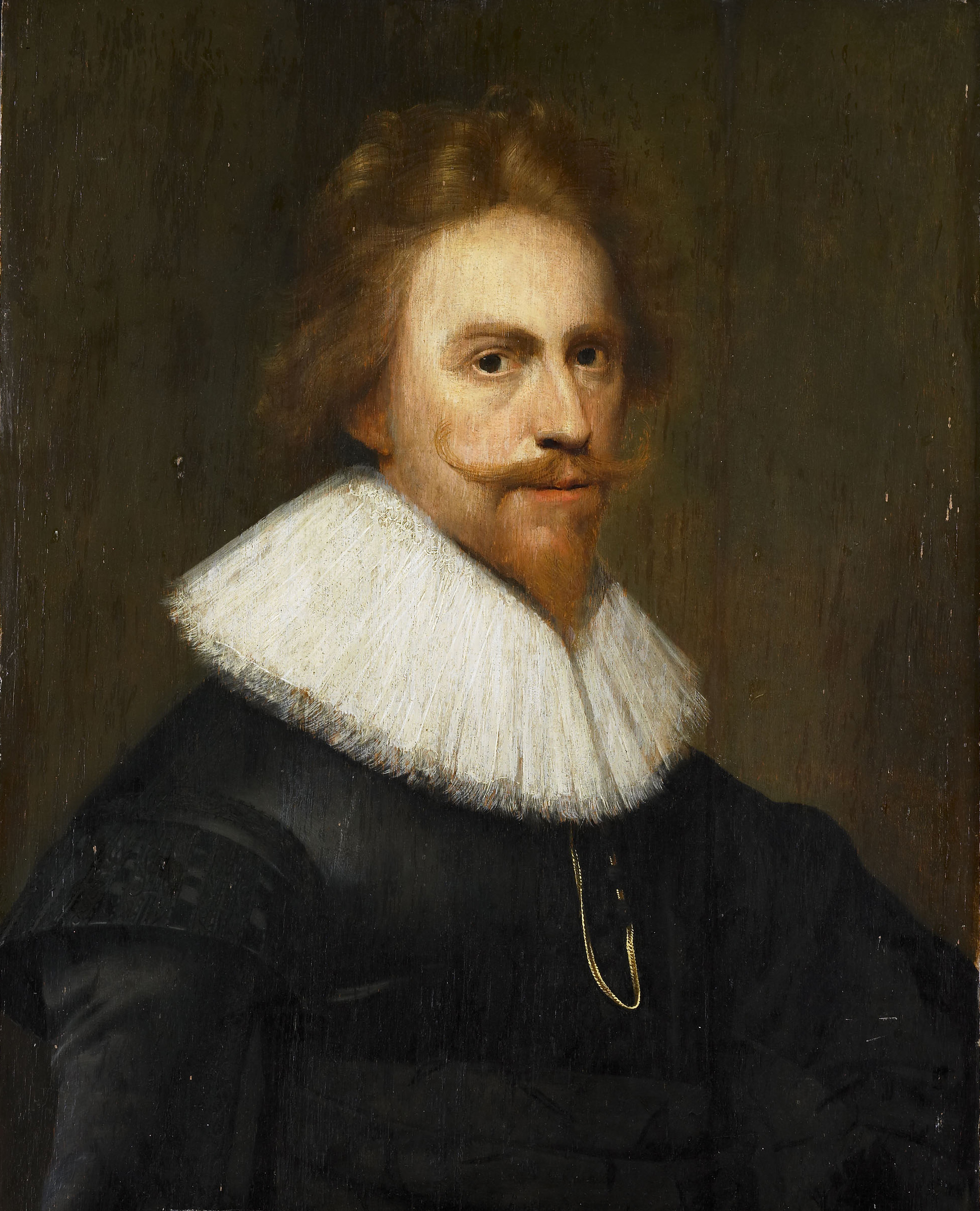
- Wybrand de Geest, self-portrait 1629
- Born: Wybrand de Geest; 16 August 1592; Leeuwarden
- Died: c. 1661 (aged 68–69); Leeuwarden
- Known for: Painting
- Movement: Baroque

Wybrand Simonsz. de Geest (16 August 1592 – c. 1661) was a Dutch Golden Age portrait painter from Friesland.

== Biography ==
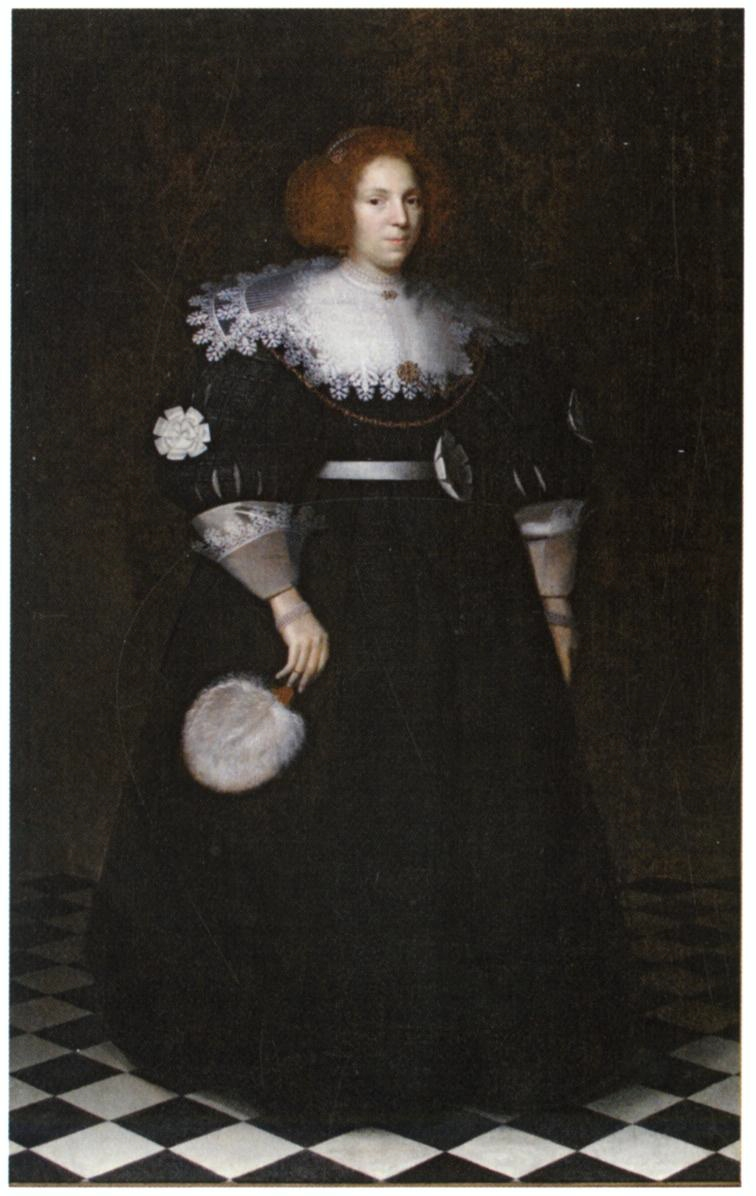
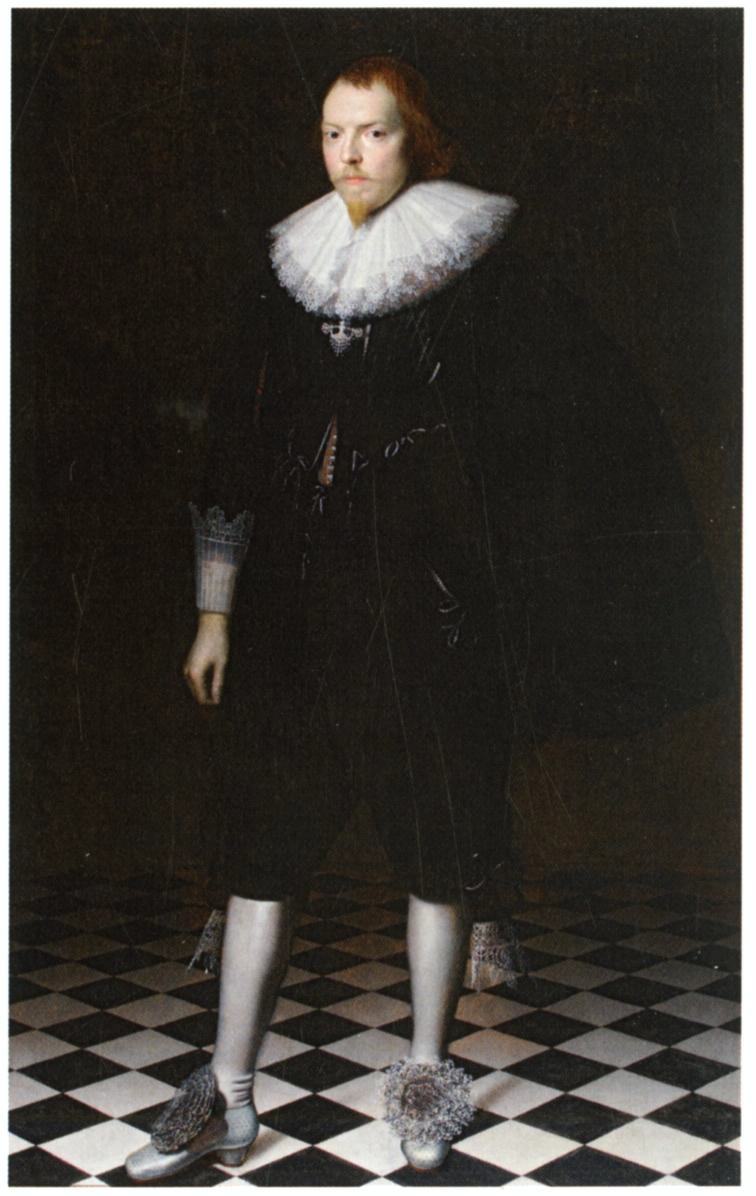
Wedding portraits of Maria Overlander and Frans Banning Cocq, 1630, oil on canvas, each 198.5 × 121 cm, Museum Het Prinsenhof, Delft

Wybrand de Geest was born and died at Leeuwarden. He learned painting from his father, Simon Juckesz, a stained glass worker. He studied later with Abraham Bloemaert. From 1614 to 1618 he travelled in France and Italy on a Grand Tour. In 1616 he met up with Leonard Bramer in Aix-en-Provence. While in Rome he became a member of the painters' circle known as the Bentvueghels. He earned the nickname 'De Friesche Adelaar', or "the Frisian Eagle".

De Geest married Hendrickje Fransdr Uylenburgh in 1622, a niece of Saskia van Uylenburgh, the wife of Rembrandt. In 1634, just before his own marriage, Rembrandt visited De Geest's studio. In 1636 the Frenchman Charles Ogier, secretary to Cardinal Richelieu visited De Geest, to view his large collection of curiosities and coins.

== Portraits ==
De Geest was the most important portrait painter of Friesland and painted numerous portraits of the well-to-do citizens of his day, many of which survive in the Fries Museum. Perhaps the most intimate portraits he painted were those of his direct family:

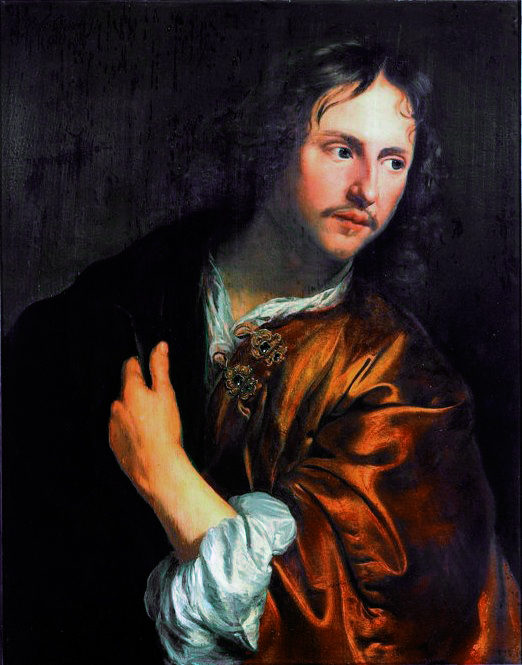
Adam Pynacker, his son-in-law

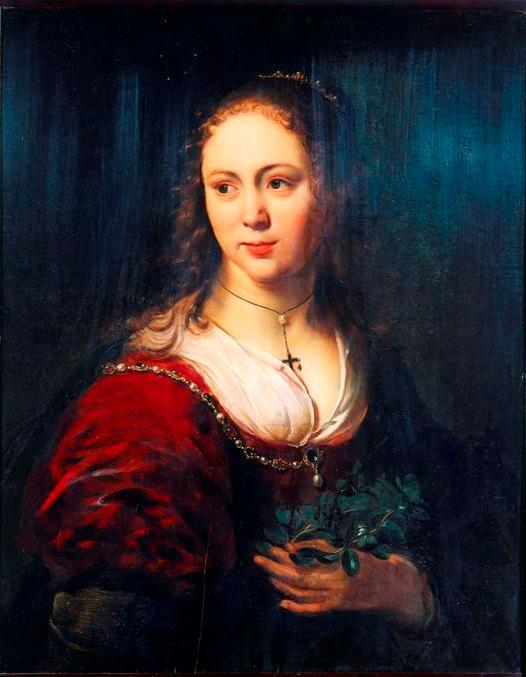
Eva de Geest, his daughter

De Geest influenced Jacob Adriaensz Backer, and his students were Jan Jansz. de Stomme, and Jacob Potma. His sons Julius and Frank also became painters. His grandson Wybrand wrote plays, a travel guide to Rome, and published "Het Kabinet der Statuen" (1702).
