= Maria Overlander van Purmerland =

Maria Overlander
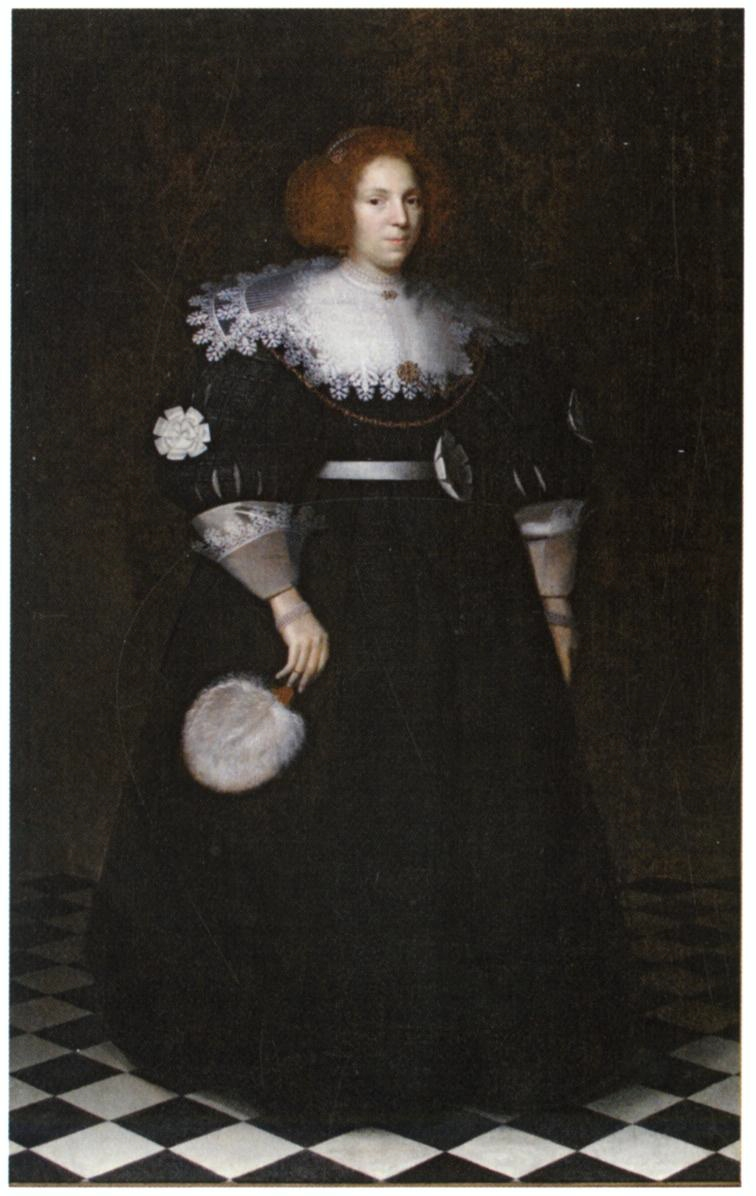
- Maria Overlander in 1630
- Born: Maria Overlander van Purmerland; 24 June 1603; Amsterdam
- Died: 27 January 1678 (aged 74)
- Burial place: Oude Kerk
- Spouse: Frans Banninck Cocq (married 1630-55; his death)

Maria Overlander van Purmerland (Amsterdam, 24 June 1603 – 27 January 1678) was a noble from the Dutch Golden Age and Free Lady of Purmerland and Ilpendam. She was married to Frans Banninck Cocq, who was the captain of the 1642 painting The Night Watch by Rembrandt.

== Life ==
Maria was a scion of the Overlander van Purmerland family and the daughter of the Amsterdam burgomaster, landlord and shipowner Volkert Overlander and Geertruid Jansdr Hooft (1578-1636), daughter of Jan Pietersz Hooft (1543-1602) and Geertruid Lons. Her relatives included the Amsterdam burgomaster Cornelis Hooft, her great-uncle, and his son Pieter Cornelisz Hooft, who was an important poet and writer. The Overlander and Hooft families belonged to the Amsterdam patrician class. Maria's father was knighted by James I of England in 1620 at the mediation of his brother-in-law Pieter Jansz Hooft, but it is not certain whether the title also referred to his children. Maria Overlander herself had nine siblings; her younger sister Geertruid Overlander van Purmerland (1609–1634) was married to Cornelis de Graeff.

Coat of arms

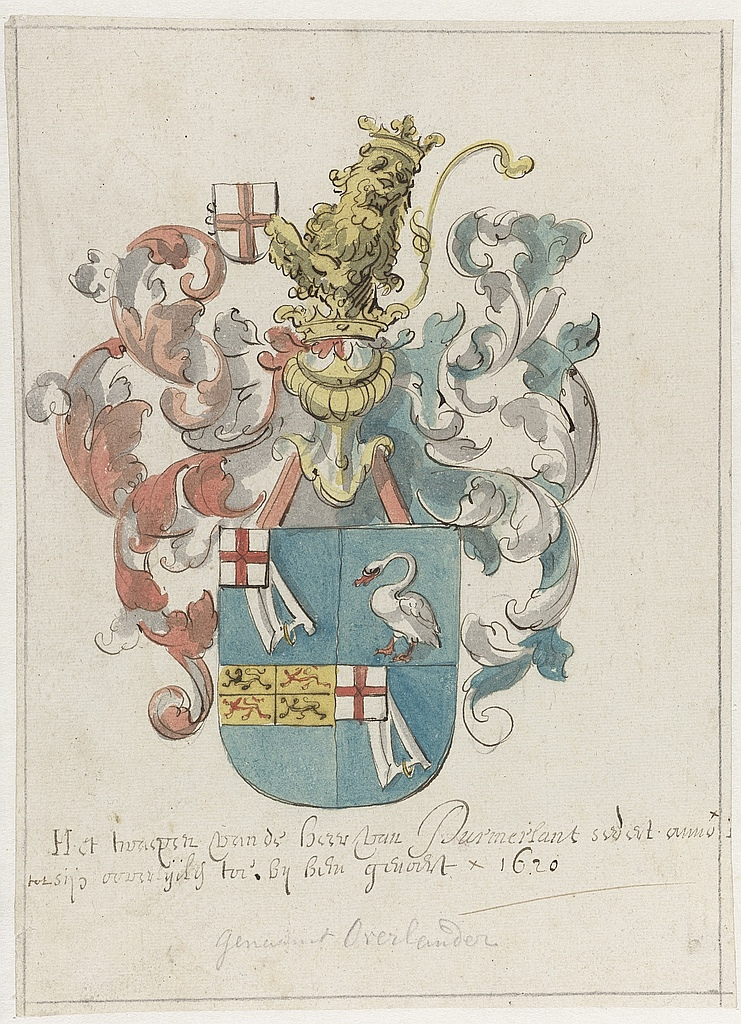
Coat of arms of her father Volkert Overlander

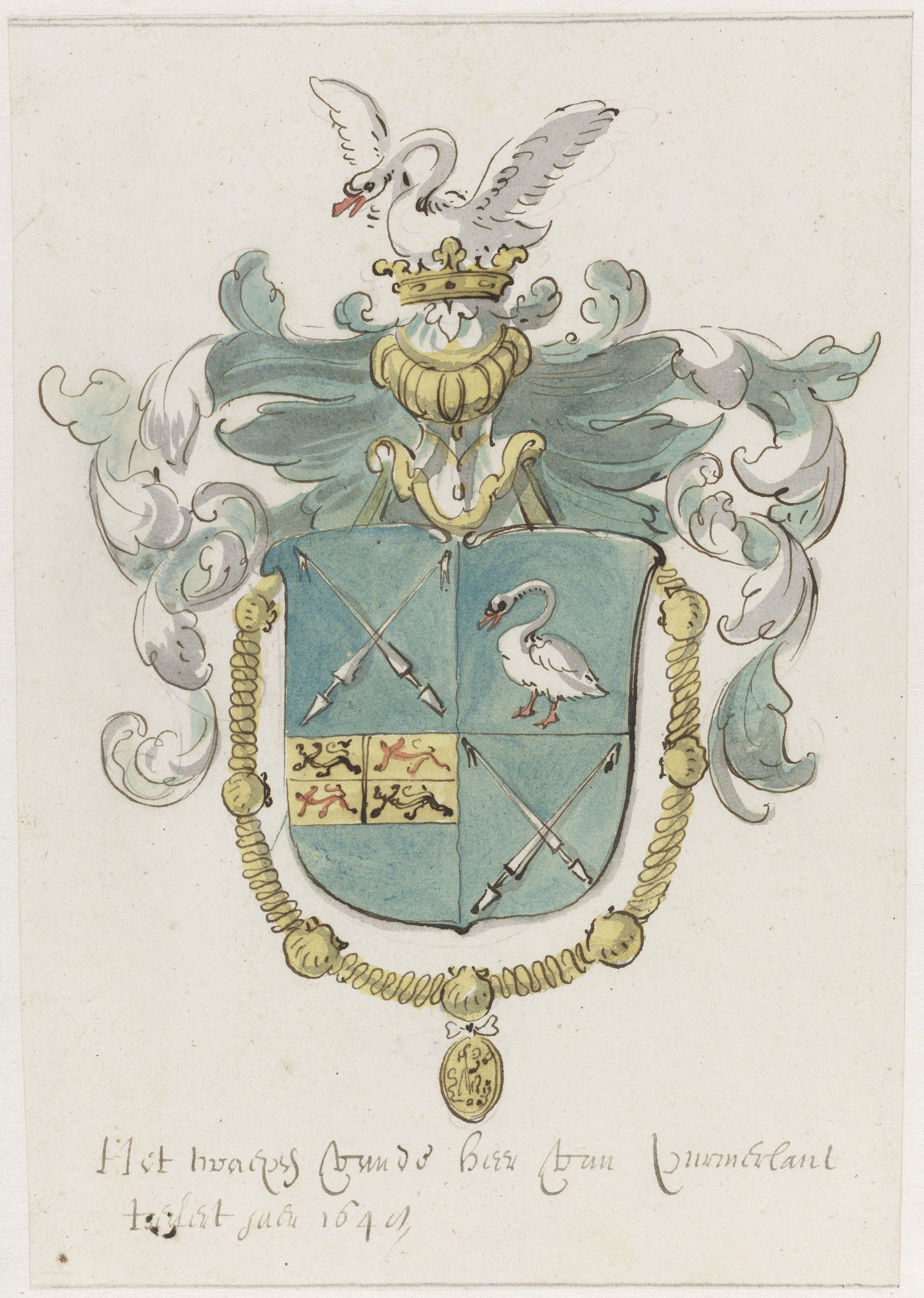
Coat of arms of her husband Frans Banninck Cocq

At the age of 27 Maria Overlander married Frans Banning Cocq, who should go down in art history through his depiction as the captain of Rembrandts painting The Night Watch. The wedding portrait of Overlander - Banninck Cocq painted by Wybrand de Geest is in the Stedelijk Museum Het Prinsenhof in Delft. The couple had no children, lived at the house De Dolphijn and resided at their castle Ilpenstein. Jan Vos wrote a poem to Maria. After the death of her mother Geertruid Jansdr Hooft in 1636, she and her husband inherited the Free and high Fief Purmerland and Ilpendam. After her husband's death in 1655, she became the sole owner. In 1674 Maria Overlander had a fortune of 200,000 guilders and was one of the richest people of the Dutch Golden Age. Since Maria Overlander had no own children, her inheritance went in equal parts in 1678 to her cousin Catharina Hooft (daughter of her paternal aunt Geertruid Overlander; 1577–1653) and Catharinas younger son Jacob de Graeff, and after his childless death in 1690/91 to his older brother Pieter de Graeff. Her tomb chapel is located in the Oude Kerk.

== Literature ==
- Moelker, H.P., De heerlijkheid Purmerland en Ilpendam (1978 Purmerend), pp. 129–155

Preceded by Frans Banning Cocq	16.th Lady of the Free and high Fief Purmerland and Ilpendam (between 1636 and 1655 together with her husband Frans Banning Cocq); 1636/1655–1678	Succeeded by Catharina Hooft and Jacob de Graeff
