= Volkert Overlander =

Dutch nobleman and merchant (1570–1630)

Volkert Overlander, painted by Cornelis van der Voort
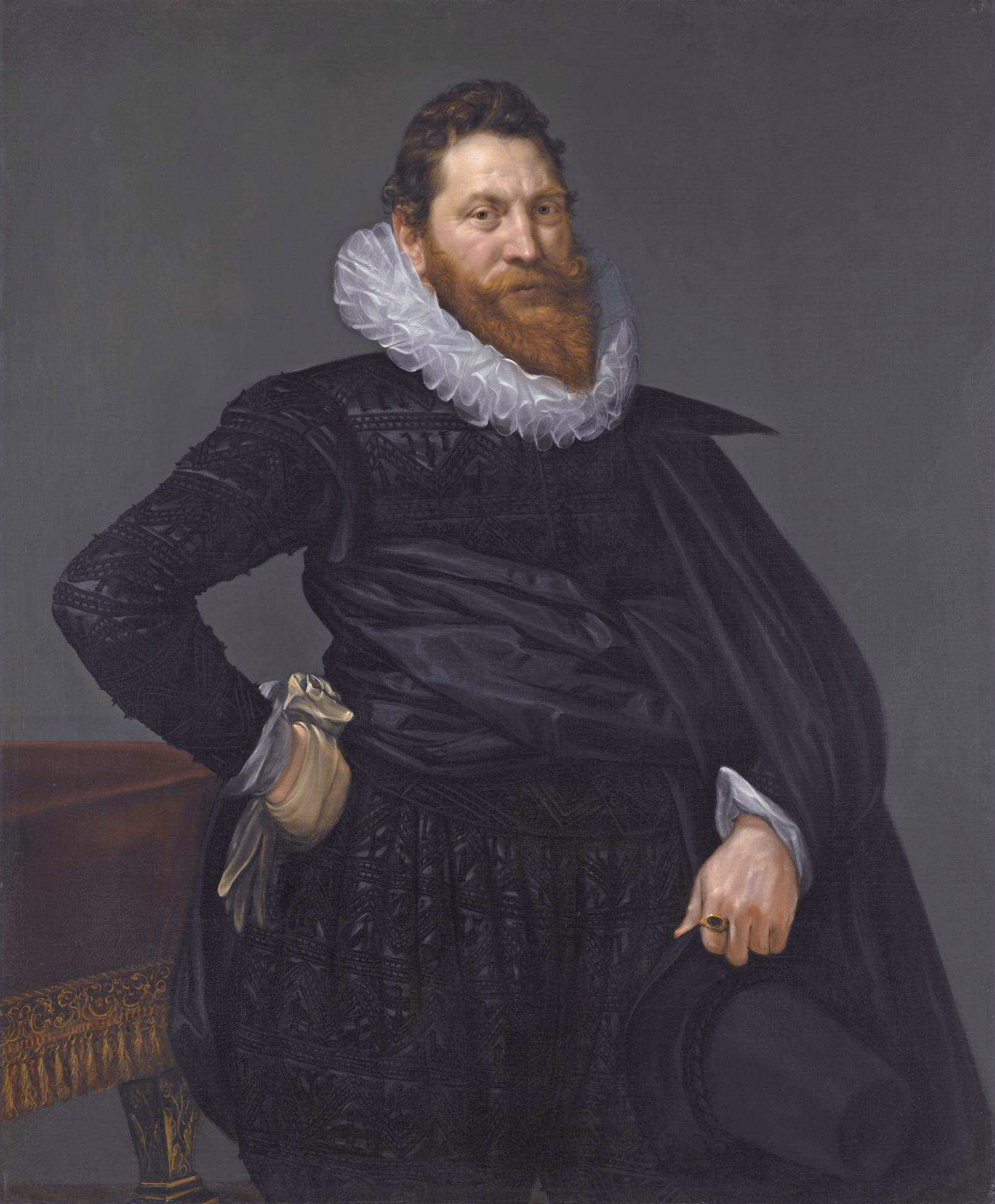

Burgemeester of Amsterdam
- Incumbent
- Assumed office 1621 and 1628

Personal details
- Born: 7 October 1570
- Died: 18 October 1630 (aged 60) Amsterdam, Netherlands
- Party: States Faction

Volkert Overlander (also Volcker and Volckert Overlander; 7 October 1570 – 18 October 1630) was a Dutch noble, jurist, ship-owner, merchant and an Amsterdam regent from the Dutch Golden Age.

== Biography ==
Volkert Overlander was born in Amsterdam, the son of Nicolaes Overlander († 1607) and Catharina Sijs (also: Chijs) (1536–1617. Nicolaes was a grain merchant in Amsterdam's Warmoesstraat, and in 1580 a captain in the schutterij. He studies law at the University of Leiden and finished at the University of Basel in 1595. In 1599 he married Geertruid Jansdr Hooft (1578–1636). His sister Gertruid Overlander (1577–1653) married Geertruids brother Pieter Jansz Hooft. The couple had ten children, among other:

- Claes (Nicolaes) Overlander (van Purmerland), died unmarried in 1627; the inheritance thus passed to his sister Maria
- Maria Overlander van Purmerland (1603–1678)[6] became the wife of burgomaster Frans Banning Cocq and inherited the paternal inheritance in Purmerland and Ilpendam
- Geertruid Overlander van Purmerland (1609–1634) became the first wife of statesman and burgomaster Cornelis de Graeff who remarried in 1635 to Geertruids cousin Catharina Hooft, daughter of her paternal aunt Geertruid Overlander Geertruid Overlander (1577–1653)

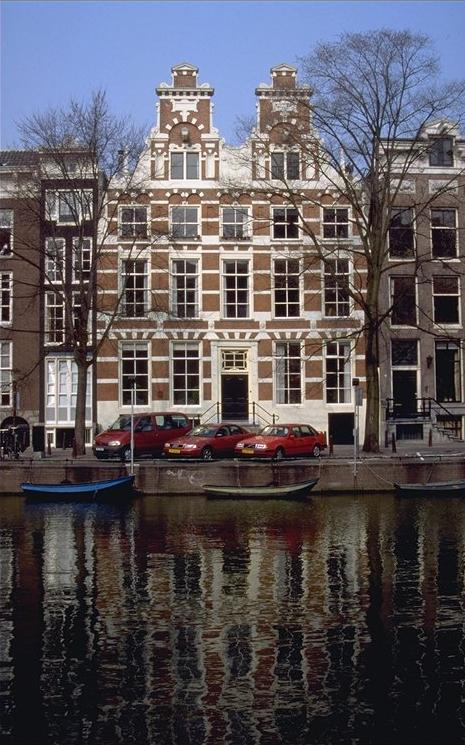
Overlaner lived in "De Dolphijn", Singel 140

Volkert Overlander worked as a merchant and shipowner. In 1602 Volkert Overlander became one of the founders of the Dutch East Trading Company. He lived in the cityhouse De Dolphijn in the Amsterdam Singel, which he bought in 1609 from the important writer and thinker Hendrick Laurensz Spiegel for 14,000 guilders. In 1603 he was appointed Schepen of Amsterdam, and between 1605 and 1630 he was member of the Vroedschap. Between 1614 and 1621 he became a councillor of the Admiralty of Amsterdam. In 1618 Volkert bought the Free and High Fief Ilpendam and Purmerland from the Creditor from the Count of Egmond and in 1622 he built the castle of Ilpenstein. In 1620 Overlander was raised to the hereditary knighthood by the English King James I through the mediation of his brother-in-law Pieter Jansz Hooft. He was made first Dijkgraaf of the Purmer in the early 1620s. In the years 1621 and 1628 he was appointed burgomaster of Amsterdam. In 1628 Overlander became an advisor of the States of Holland and West Friesland in The Hague, a position which he held until his death. After his death his fortune was estimated at 150,000 guilders.

== Coat of arms ==
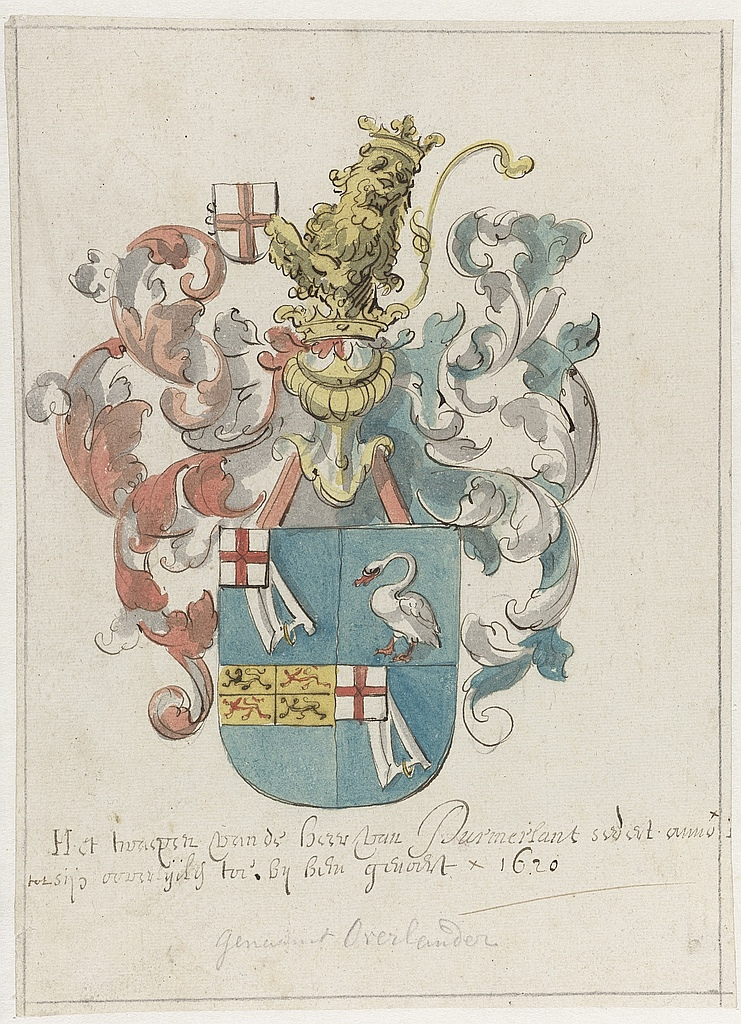
Coat of arms Volkert Overlander

- Quartered: I and IV in blue an antique plow bar, placed diagonally right with the point upwards and a shield angle of silver, charged with a cross of red; II In blue a swan of silver, beak and legs of red (Lordship Purmerland); III In blue a quartered shield head, I and IV in gold a walking lion of black, II and III in gold a walking lion of red (Lordship Ilpendam).

| Preceded by States of Holland | 13.th Lord of the Free and high Lordship Purmerland and Ilpendam; 1618–1630 | Succeeded by Geertruid Hooft |

== Literature ==
- Elias, J.E., De vroedschap van Amsterdam (1903-5 Haarlem), p. 274
- Moelker, H.P., De heerlijkheid Purmerland en Ilpendam (1978 Purmerend), p. 120-124
