= Frans Banninck Cocq =

Dutch guard captain, mayor of Amsterdam

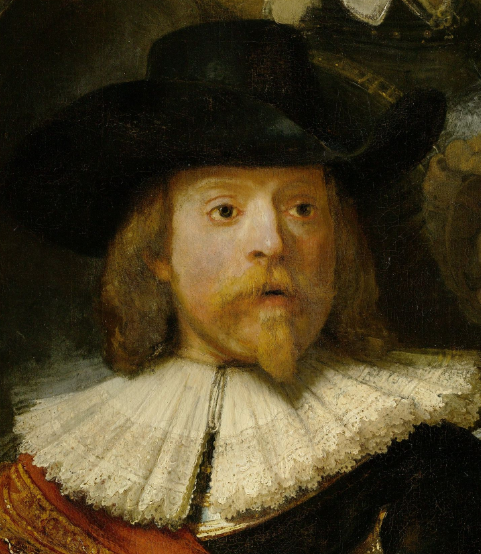
- Frans Banninck Cocq in 1642, detail of The Night Watch by Rembrandt
- Born: 25 February 1605; Warmoesstraat
- Died: January 1, 1655 (aged 49); Amsterdam
- Burial place: Oude Kerk
- Occupations: Knight, burgemeester (mayor) and military person
- Spouse: Maria Overlander van Purmerland (married 1630-55; his death)

Frans Banninck Cocq (sometimes incorrectly spelled as Banning), free lord of Purmerland and Ilpendam (February 23, 1605 – January 1, 1655) was a knight, burgemeester (mayor) and military person of Amsterdam in the mid-17th century, the Dutch Golden Age. He belonged to the wealthy and powerful Dutch patriciate, the regenten, and is best known as the central figure in Rembrandt's masterpiece The Night Watch.

== Biography ==
=== Background and family ===
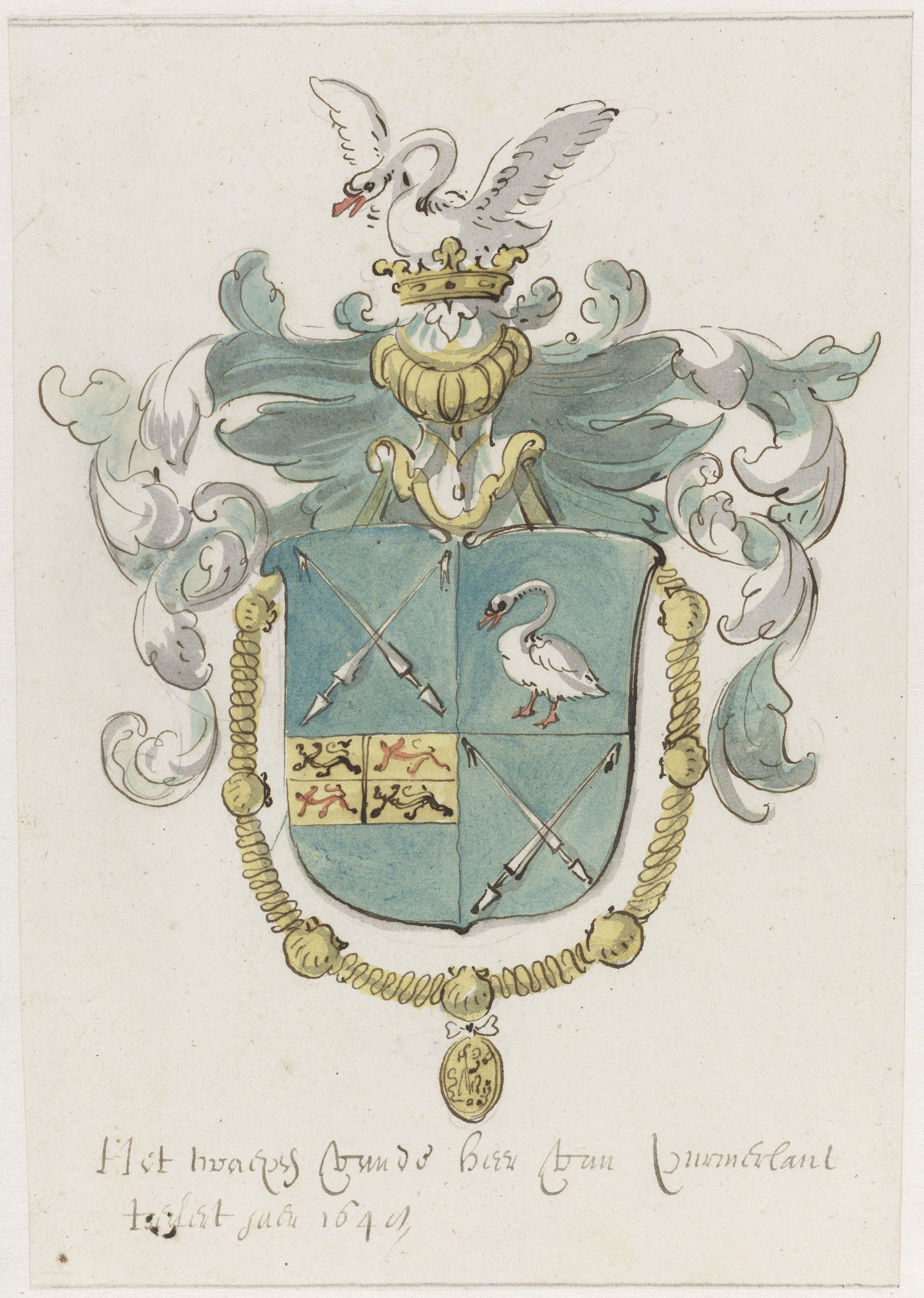
Coat of arms Frans Banninck Cocq, drawing by Pieter Jansz., 1648, Rijksprentenkabinet, Amsterdam

Frans was born on February 23, 1605, as the son of Jan Jansz Cock (1575–1633), a local pharmacist of German descendant in the Warmoesstraat. His father, born in Bremen, moved around 1592 to Amsterdam. Nothing is known about his grandfather. He was married to Lysbeth Fransdr Banninck (1581–1623) of Amsterdam origin. In the Amsterdam patriciate of the 16th and 17th centuries, there were two families with very similar names, the Banning(h) family, also known as Benning(h), and the Banninck family, which were not closely related to each other. The first-named family was of greater importance, since they were members of the city government for a longer period of time. Banninck Cocq's mother belonged to the less important family, and was related to Amsterdam burgomaster Cornelis Hooft. Deviating from the tradition according to which, as the first-born, he was to receive the name of his paternal grandfather, he received the first and last name of his maternal grandfather Frans Banninck (1544–1582), who died at young age. The Bannincks had been members of the Amsterdam City Council for generations and only Frans Banninck Cocq's early death, before he could reach an office, broke the tradition. In this way, the parents documented their right to continue a family tradition. Frans was baptized on 27 February 1605 in the Oude Kerk. As his parents were not married, it caused a scandal, but on 17 September of the same year they went to the townhall to notice the marriage.

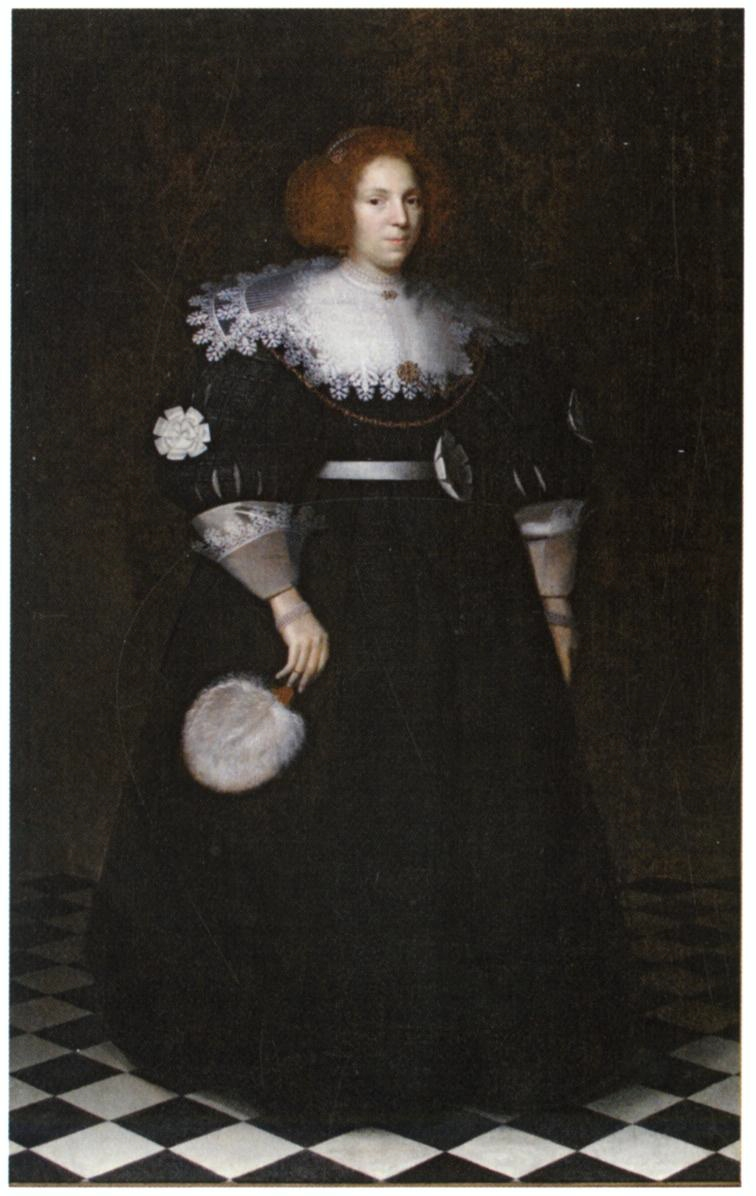
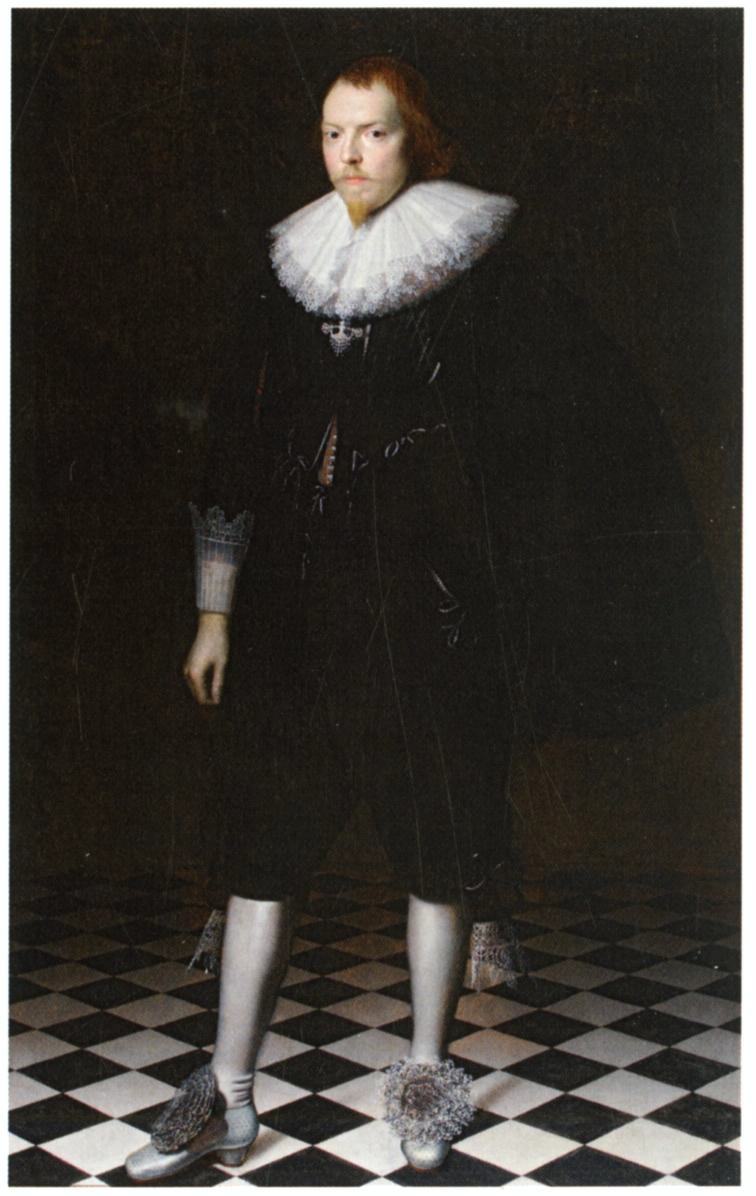
Wedding portraits of Maria Overlander and Frans Banning Cocq, Wybrand de Geest, 1630, oil on canvas, each 198.5 × 121 cm, Museum Het Prinsenhof, Delft

Frans Banninck Cocq, who seems to have had one deaf brother, studied law in Poitiers and Bourges between 1625 and 1627. In 1630 he married Maria Overlander van Purmerland, daughter of knight Volkert Overlander, merchant, one of the founders of the Dutch East Trading Company, a few times burgemeester of Amsterdam and Lord of Purmerland and Ilpendam. One of her sisters, Geertruid Overlander van Purmerland (1609–1634), was married to statesman and Amsterdam burgomaster Cornelis de Graeff.

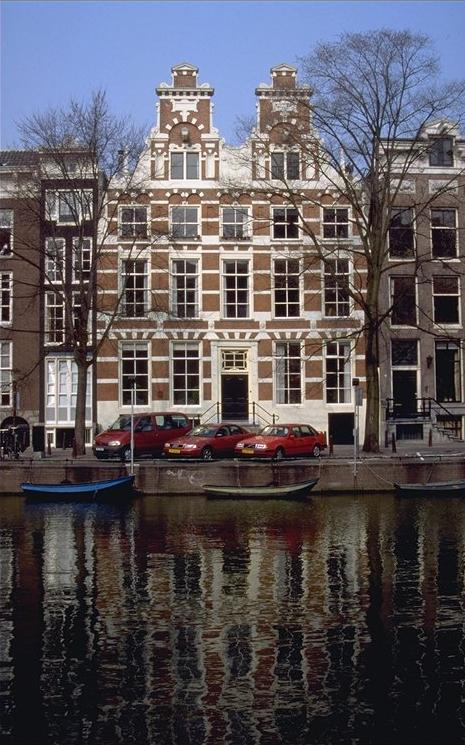
Banninck Cocq lived in "De Dolphijn", Singel 140

Through his marriage Banninck Cocq became linked with the powerful Bicker and De Graeff families of Amsterdam and also to the family of Johan de Witt, later Grand Pensionary of Holland. When Frans' father-in-law died, Banninck Cocq inherited his properties, including the title Free Lord of Purmerland and Ilpendam along with the castle of Ilpenstein north of Amsterdam and the canal house De Dolphijn in the city. At Ilpenstein, Banninck Cocq decorated the main hall with portraits of his wife's ancestors. The couple had no children.

=== Political career ===
From 1632 he held a large number of offices in the Amsterdam city administration. In 1632, 1633 and 1636 he became a member of the Commission for Marital Affairs. In 1634, 1635, 1641, 1643, 1644 and 1650 he was a member of the Commission for Small Affairs (Commissaris van Kleine zaken). In 1634 he succeeded his father-in-law as a member of the vroedschap (city council). In 1637, 1640, 1642, 1645, 1646, 1648 and 1649 he was elected to Schepen. From 1638 to 1639 he was a member of the commission for the municipal loan (Commissaris van de Bank van Leening).

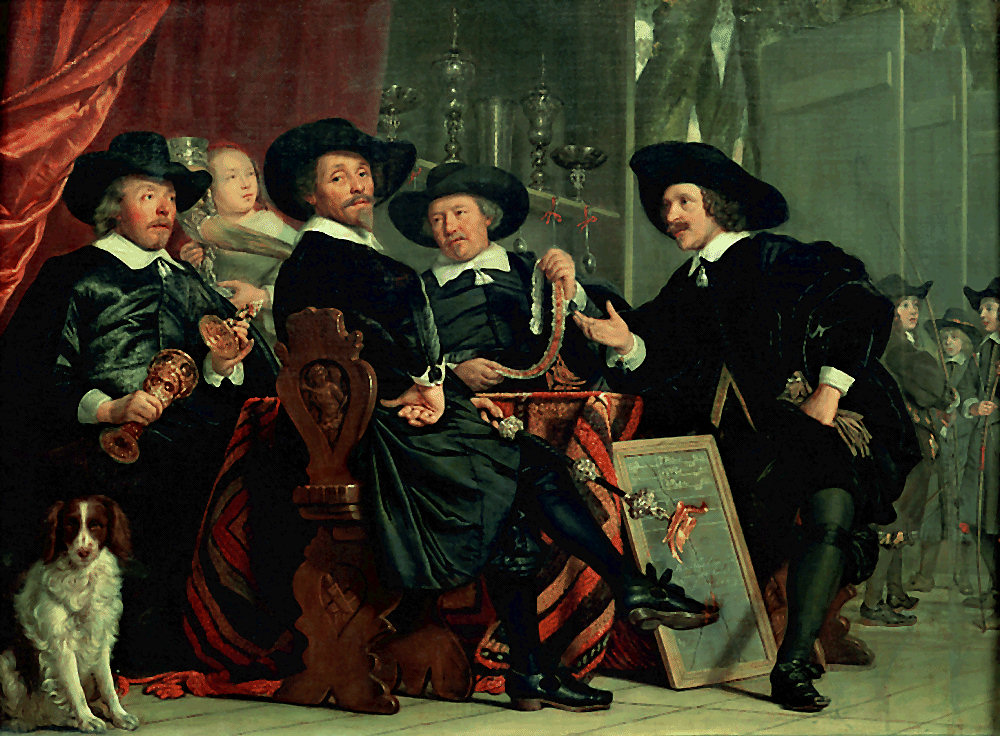
The Amsterdam archery militia whose patron saint was St. Sebastian, in 1653 by Bartholomeus van der Helst. Cocq is at the left.

In 1648 he was accepted as a knight in the French Ordre de Saint-Michel. In 1650 he was appointed burgemeester of Amsterdam (mayor). In 1651, 1653 and 1654 he was re-elected. He acted in close cooperation with his brother-in-law Cornelis de Graeff, leader of the state-oriented-faction De Graeff, and Johan Huydecoper van Maarsseveen.

=== Military career, Night watch ===
In 1635 Frans Banninck Cocq was a lieutenant of the Amsterdam civil guard (militia) of Wijk I and captain of that of Wijk II from about 1635 to about 1646. From about 1646 to 1650 he was a colonel. He is also depicted in the Bartholomeus van der Helst portrait of The Governors of the Longbow Civic Guards, 1653, now in the Amsterdam Museum.

Banninck Cocq is primarily known today for being depicted in a painting by Rembrandt van Rijn commissioned in 1638, which shows him and his company of civil guards. Although known as The Night Watch (1642), this is not the original title; at that time it was in fact unusual to title paintings but if indeed it had a name, the more correct one would be "The Company of Captain Frans Banning Cocq and Lieutenant Willem van Ruytenburch". The painting is notable, among other things, for its huge size: approximately 3.35 m x 4.26 m (11 ft by 14 ft).

=== Heritage ===
Frans Banninck Cocq was buried on 6 January 1655; his tomb chapel is located in the Oude Kerk.

His inheritance passed to his widow Maria, who named her cousin Catharina Hooft (daughter of Maria's paternal aunt Geertruid Overlander; 1577–1653) and their two sons, her nephews Pieter de Graeff and Jacob de Graeff as heirs on her death in 1678. Catharina and Jacob inherited the Lordship of Purmerland and Ilpendam, while Pieter inherited their fortune of 200,000 guilders and after the death of Jacob (1690) and Catharina (1691) the lordship.

==== The family album of Frans Banninck Cocq ====
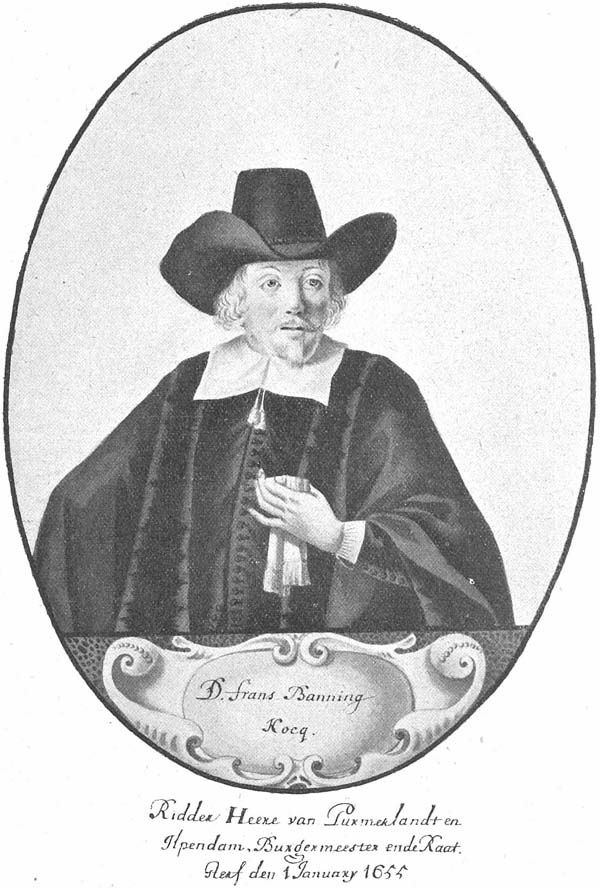
Portrait of Frans Banninck Cocq, captioned Dr. Frans Banning Cocq probably comes from Pieter de Graeff

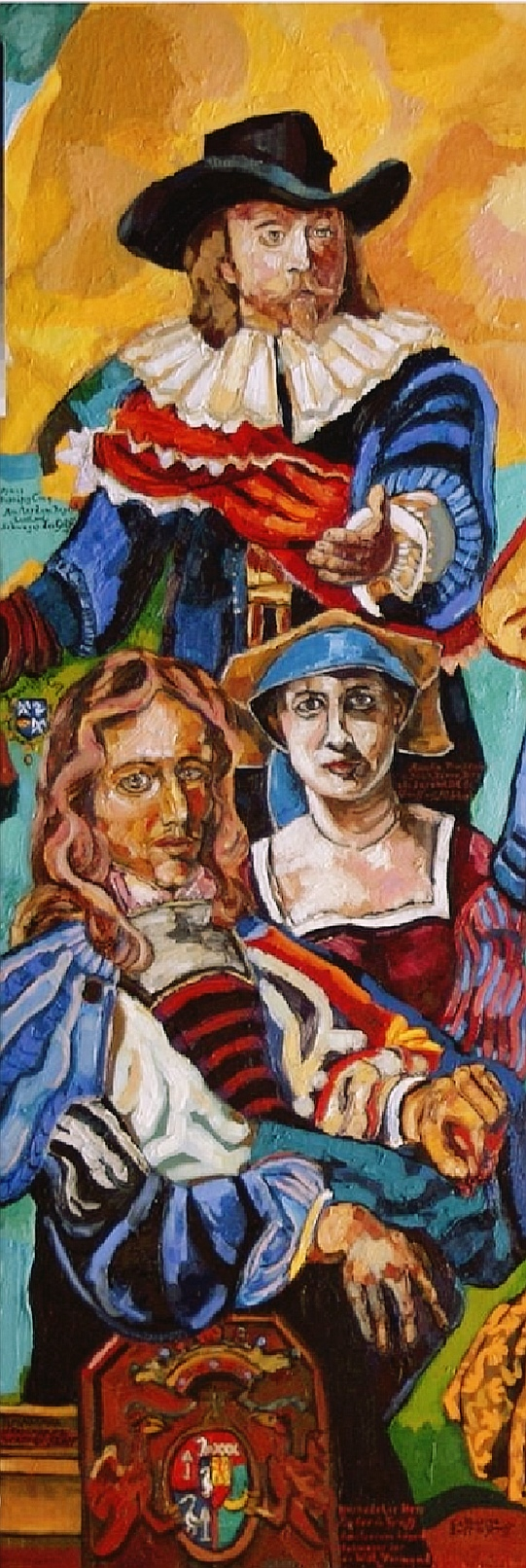
Frans Banning Cocq (back) with his nephew and heir Pieter de Graeff (front). Detail from the painting "Ahnenfolge" (Ancestral Succession/Ancestry) by Matthias Laurenz Gräff (diploma thesis "Weltaußenschau-Weltinnenschau", 2007)

Two families with similar names existed in the Amsterdam patriciate, the Banning(h) family, also known as Benning(h), and the Banninck family, who were not closely related. The Banning(h) / Benning(h) family was of greater importance, since they were members of the city government for a longer period of time. Frans Banninck Cocq belonged to the less important Banninck family via his mother's side. Due to the similar names, there were already misspellings among contemporaries. A two-part family album created by Banninck Cocq contains numerous colored drawings and watercolors in addition to a copy of The Night Watch. It shows the genealogy of his family, with illustrations of a number of coats of arms. Numerous buildings are also shown to which Banninck Cocq had a relationship. Many of the illustrations were probably painted by himself, and the book was completed by himself around 1654. The Night Watch was probably painted by Jacob Colijns on behalf of Banninck Cocq. A number of handwritten additions were made by his nephew and later heir Pieter de Graeff after Banninck Cocq's death in 1655. It is possible that other drawings and watercolors in the family book were also added by Colijns after Banninck Cocq's death, who also forged or falsified documents on other families related to him in De Graeff's favor. For a long time it was assumed that Banninck Cocq himself had manipulated the family albums in such a way that they proved his origin from the older patrician family. In fact, the forgeries were made in the handwriting of De Graeff, who had lost his municipal offices after the Rampjaar in 1672 and therefore also had reason and opportunity to improve his family history. The painter Colijns, who may have also painted the copy of the Night Watch in the family album, and the poet Joost van den Vondel also assisted him in manipulating this family history. The Dutch historian Johan Engelbert Elias published his two-volume history of the Amsterdam city government De vroedschap van Amsterdam, 1578–1795 between 1903 and 1905. Elias did not see through De Graeff's forgeries and combined both families into one, but this could be refuted in the 21st century by new research and the completely different family crests. The family book is still owned by the De Graeff family and is on permanent loan in the Rijksprentenkabinet of the Rijksmuseum Amsterdam.

== In popular culture ==
While The Night Watch itself is widely referenced in media, some works focus specifically on Frans Banning Cocq:

- "The Shooting Company of Captain Frans B. Cocq" is the fifth track of the album Universal Migrator Part 1: The Dream Sequencer by the prog rock band Ayreon
- Nightwatching (2007) is a film directed by Peter Greenaway that depicts a fictionalized rendition of Cocq’s life

== Succession template ==
Preceded by Geertruid Hooft	15.th Lord of the Free and high Lordship Purmerland and Ilpendam; 1637–1655	Succeeded by Maria Overlander van Purmerland
