= Ilpenstein Castle =

- Ilpenstein / Huis te Ilpendam / Hof te Ilpendam
- Ilpendam, Netherlands
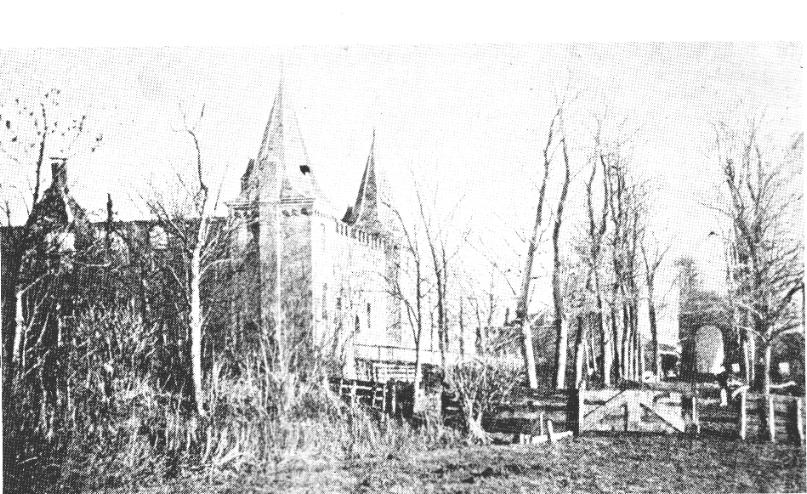
- Photo of Ilpenstein

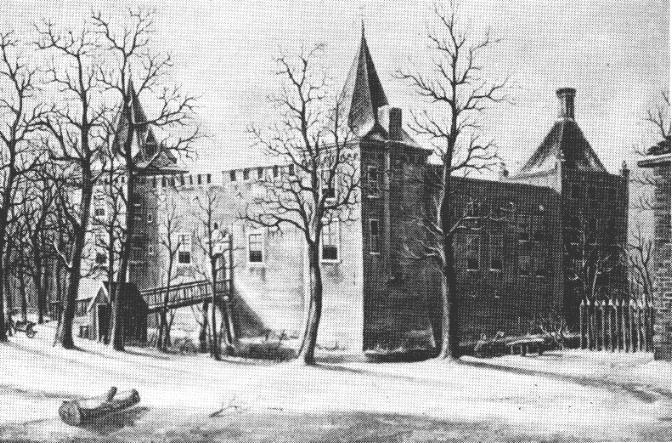
- Ilpenstein Castle (second half 19th century)

Site information
- Type: Castle
- Condition: Demolished

Location
- the Netherlands
- Location within Netherlands
- Coordinates: 52.4645°N 4.9575°E

Site history
- Built: 1618-1622
- Built by: Volkert Overlander
- Demolished: 1872

Ilpenstein Castle (Dutch: Ilpenstein, Huis te Ilpendam, Hof te Ilpendam) was a castle of the Free and High Lordship of Purmerend, Purmerland and Ilpendam, located in Ilpendam (Waterland) in the north of Amsterdam.

== History ==
In 1618, Volkert Overlander - knight, mayor and advisor of the city of Amsterdam - bought the Lordship from the Count of Egmond. In 1622 Overlander built the castle of Ilpenstein.

After Overlanders death, Frans Banning Cocq, who had married his daughter Maria Overlander van Purmerland, inherited his influence and properties in the north of Amsterdam as well as the title Free Lord of Purmerland and Ilpendam. After Banning Cocqs death in 1655 the castle belonged to the Amsterdam regent family De Graeff.

Joost van den Vondel wrote poems about Pieter de Graeffs and Jacoba Bickers wedding in 1662 at castle Ilpenstein. Their cousin and brother-in-law Johan de Witt was also at the wedding.

The last residents of the castle were Christina Elisabeth de Graeff and her husband Jacob Gerrit van Garderen. In 1872, the castle was sold and demolished and a new building was constructed at the site.

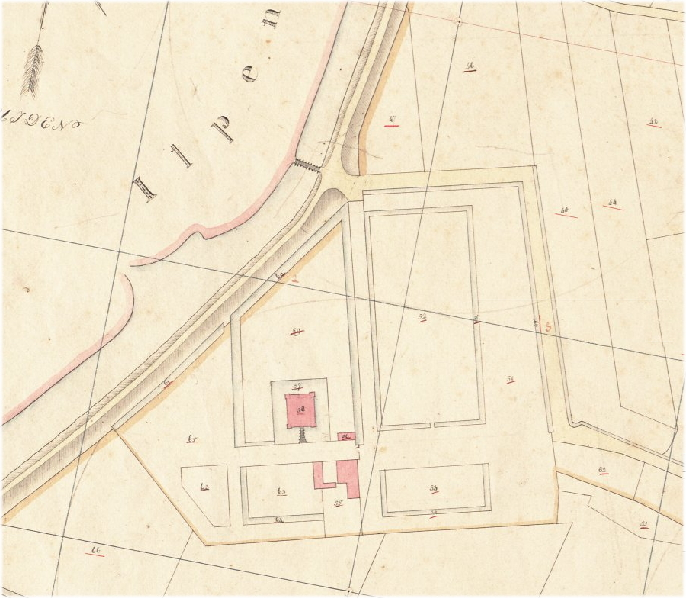
Map of Ilpenstein

== See also ==
- List of castles in the Netherlands
