= Cornelis de Graeff (disambiguation) =

Cornelis de Graeff (1599–1664) was a Dutch politician and diplomat.

Cornelis de Graeff may also refer to:

- Cornelis de Graeff (Dutch noble, born 1650) (1650–1678), Dutch nobleman, nephew of the above
- Cornelis de Graeff II (1671–1719), Dutch nobleman, grandson of the politician
- Andries Cornelis Dirk de Graeff (1872–1957), Dutch colonial administrator and diplomat, descendant of the above
