= Gerrit de Graeff (II) van Zuid-Polsbroek =

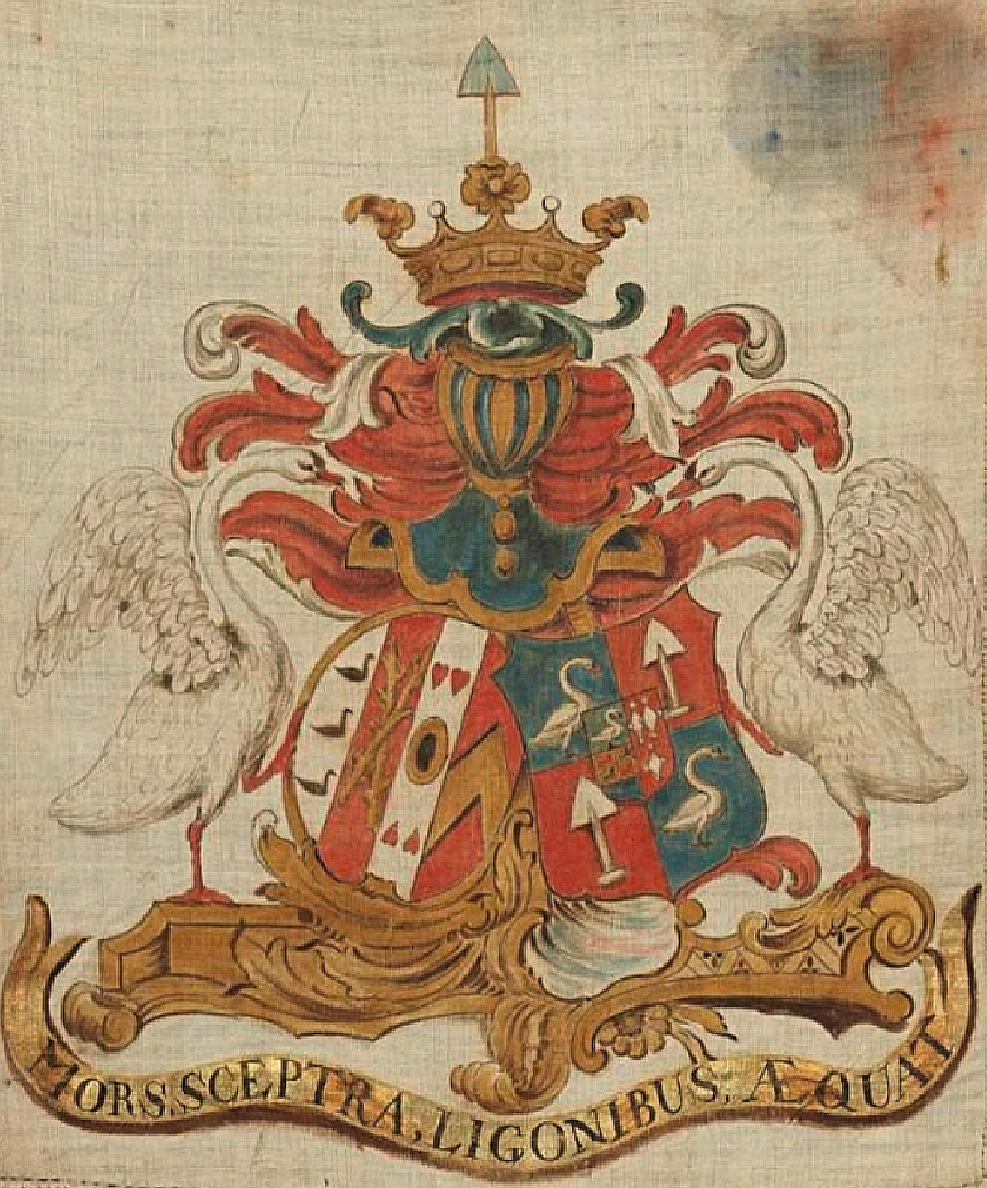
Alliance crest De Graeff-Van Herzeele (Gerrit de Graeff van Zuid-Polsbroek on the right side, his wife Christina van Herzeele on the left side)

Gerrit de Graeff (II) van Zuid-Polsbroek (23 December 1741 in Amsterdam – 20 December 1811 at Ilpenstein) was a Dutch politician at local and national Level during the Patriottentijd and afterwards. He belonged to the patrician class of Amsterdam and held the feudal titles Free Lord of Zuid-Polsbroek as those of Purmerland and Ilpendam.

== Biography ==
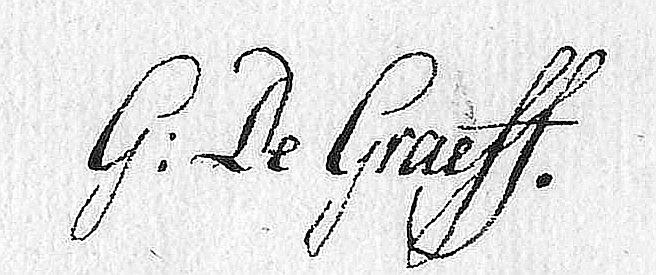
Signature of Gerrit de Graeff

Gerrit de Graeff was a scion of the influential De Graeff family from Amsterdam. His parents where Gerrit de Graeff (I.) van Zuid-Polsbroek (1711–1752) and his second wife Elizabeth Lestevenon (1716–1766). Gerrit was related through his father's marriages to the ambassador Mattheus Lestevenon and Apollonius Jan Cornelis Lampsins, nominally Baron of Tobago. After his father's death in 1752 his older brother Joan de Graeff inherited the title Free Lord (Vrijheer) of Zuid-Polsbroek, and after his sudden death in 1754 Gerrit succeeded him there. In 1766, after the death of his mother, he succeeded her as Free Lord of Purmerland and Ilpendam. He received his doctorate on 28 July 1763 at the University of Leiden. In 1785 he married Christina van Herzeele, with whom he had two children:

- Gerrit III de Graeff, his successor in the high Lordships
- Geertruid Elisabeth de Graeff (1776–1857), married to general Gijsbert Carel Rutger Reinier van Brienen van Ramerus (1771–1821)

Gerrit de Graeff was a Remonstrant and patriotic politician in the tradition of the 17th century regents of the Dutch States Party. Between 1762 and 1787 he held various government posts in Amsterdam, including Vroedschap, Schepen (both since 1771), Councilor (1771–1781) and Commissioner (1762). He lived at Herengracht, in a mansion now the Tassenmuseum Hendrikje. In 1776 he was named as commissioner of the 't Zandpad in the Noorderkwartier. In 1787, after the invasion of Prussian troops in Holland and the reinstatement of Stadtholder William V of Orange, he was expelled from the city government together with burgomaster Hendrik Daniëlsz Hooft because of his democratic sentiments and attitude.

After the French troops had invaded and the Batavian Republic was founded, Gerrit De Graeff was again admitted to the city government in June 1795 together with a number of old vroedschap members such as Willem Backer, Daniel Hooft, Cornelis van der Hoop and Jan Bernd Bicker. In 1799 he was appointed a member of the Governing Council Vertegenwoordigend Lichaam (parliament during the Batavian Republic), and in 1803 he was named Wethouder and Council of Amsterdam.

Gerrit de Graeff died on 20 December 1811 at Ilpenstein Castle. His burial chapel is located in the Reformed Church in Ilpendam.

Gerrit de Graeff (II) van Zuid-Polsbroek House De Graeff Born: 23 December 1741 Died: 20 December 1811
Regnal titles
Preceded by Joan de Graeff	Free Lord of Zuid-Polsbroek; 1754–1811	Succeeded by Gerrit de Graeff (III.) van Zuid-Polsbroek
Preceded by Elizabeth Lestevenon	24th Lord of the Free and high Lordship Purmerland and Ilpendam; 1766–1811	Succeeded by Gerrit de Graeff (III.) van Zuid-Polsbroek
