= Cornelis de Graeff II =

Dutch regent (1671–1719)

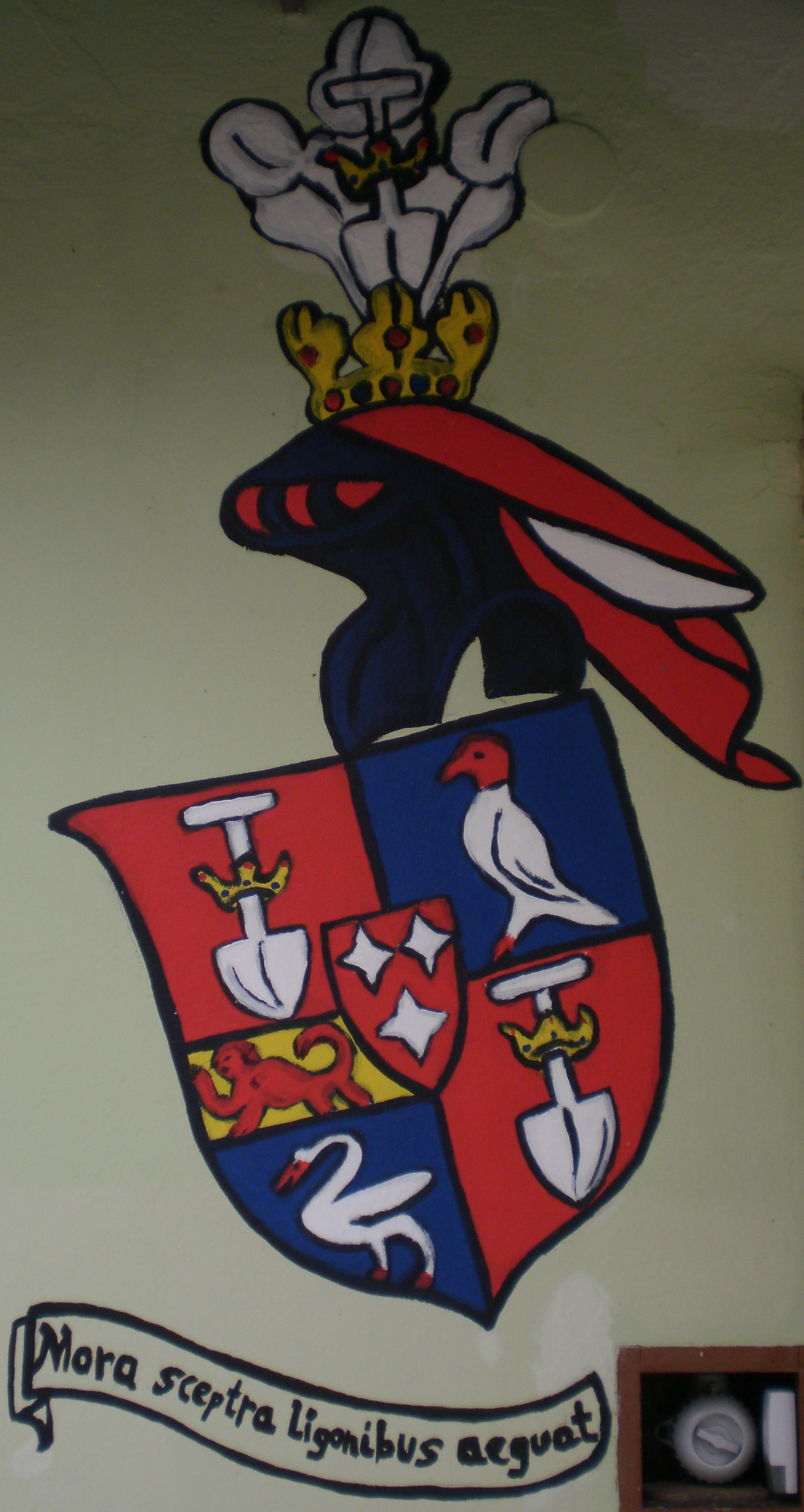
- full coat of arms De Graeff (painted by Matthias Laurenz Gräff, 2011)

Personal details
- Born: 23 August 1671 Amsterdam
- Died: 27 July 1719 (aged 47) Ilpendam
- Party: States Faction
- Spouse: Cornelis was never married.
- Occupation: Landlord
- Profession: Canon of St. Pieter at Utrecht

Cornelis de Graeff (23 August 1671, Amsterdam – 16 February 1719, Ilpendam) was a member of the family De Graeff, a prominent regent family from the Dutch Golden Age. He held the title 20th Free Lord of Purmerland and Ilpendam.

== Biography ==
His parents were Pieter de Graeff and his cousin Jacoba Bicker, his younger brother was Johan de Graeff, the Free Lord of Zuid-Polsbroek. His uncle was Johan de Witt, Statesman of the True Freedom, husband of Wendela Bicker, sister of Cornelis' mother Jacoba.

Cornelis de Graeff was a Canon of St. Pieter at Utrecht. Most of the time he resided at his castle Ilpenstein. He also owned Bronstee, a country estate near Heemstede. De Graeff was mentally disturbed and remained unmarried. Since his father's death in 1707 he was under the tutelage of Jacobus de Fremeri, and died at his castle Ilpenstein on February 16, 1719. His successor as Free Lord of Purmerland and Ilpendam was his cousin Gerrit de Graeff. Cornelis' burial chapel is in the Oude Kerk in Amsterdam, in the Sint Cornelis choir, the family grave of the De Graeff family.

At Ilpenstein castle De Graeff had a famous art collection, including Rembrandts Jacob Blessing the Sons of Joseph (the sitters were Wendela de Graeff and her two sons) and the Portrait of Andries de Graeff. The two famous paintings, both by Rembrandt, can be seen today at Wilhelmshöhe in Kassel. De Graeff also owned Frans Halsens painting Catharina Hooft with her Nurse. In 1710 a copy of Rembrandt's 'The Night Watch' was assigned to him. Around 1712, De Graeff's curator De Fremery sold the piece to Pieter van der Lip. Rembrandt expert Abraham Bredius suspected that a second copy of 'The Night Watch', painted by Gerrit Lundens, had gone to Cornelis de Graeff; which turned out to be correct. A painting after Lundens was also present at Pieter de Graeff, after the well-known drawing in the album by De Graeffs uncle Frans Banninck Cocq. This album has been owned by the De Graeff family since 1678.

== Coat of arms ==
The personal coat of arms of Cornelis de Graeff is quarterd with a heart shield and shows the following symbols:

- heart shield shows the three silver rhombuses on red (originally from the family Van Woerdern van Vliet) of the High Lordship Zuid-Polsbroek (that Heart shield from Zuid-Polsbroek as a sign of family ownership, but not from Cornelis de Graeff himself)
- field 1 (left above) shows the silver shovel on red of their paternal ancestors, the Herren von Graben
- field 2 (right above) shows the silver swan on blue of the Fief Vredenhof [or that one (Waterland) of their maternal ancestors, the De Grebber family
- field 3 (left below) shows the silver goose in blue of Purmerland (High Lordship Purmerland and Ilpendam)
- field 4 (right below) shows the red and black lions on gold (the arms of the County of Holland) for Ilpendam (High Lordship Purmerland and Ilpendam) above a blue area
- shield holders are two silver swans
- helmet covers in red and silver
- helm adornment shows an upright silver spade with ostrich feathers (Herren von Graben)
- motto: MORS SCEPTRA LIGONIBUS AEQUAT (DEATH MAKES SEPTRES AND HOES EQUAL)

== Literature ==
- Graeff, P. de (P. de Graeff Gerritsz en Dirk de Graeff van Polsbroek) Genealogie van de familie De Graeff van Polsbroek, Amsterdam 1882.
- Bruijn, J. H. de Genealogie van het geslacht De Graeff van Polsbroek 1529/1827, met bijlagen. De Built 1962-63.
- Elias, J.E., De Vroedschap van Amsterdam 1578-1795 (1903-1905 Haarlem), page 423
- Moelker, H.P., De heerlijkheid Purmerland en Ilpendam (1978 Purmerend), page 178

Cornelis de Graeff II House De Graeff Born: 15 August 1638 Died: 3 June 1707
Dutch nobility
Preceded by Pieter de Graeff	20th Free Lord of Purmerland and Ilpendam; 1707–1719	Succeeded by Gerrit de Graeff I
