= Gerrit de Graeff (I.) van Zuid-Polsbroek =

Dutch patrician (1711–1752)

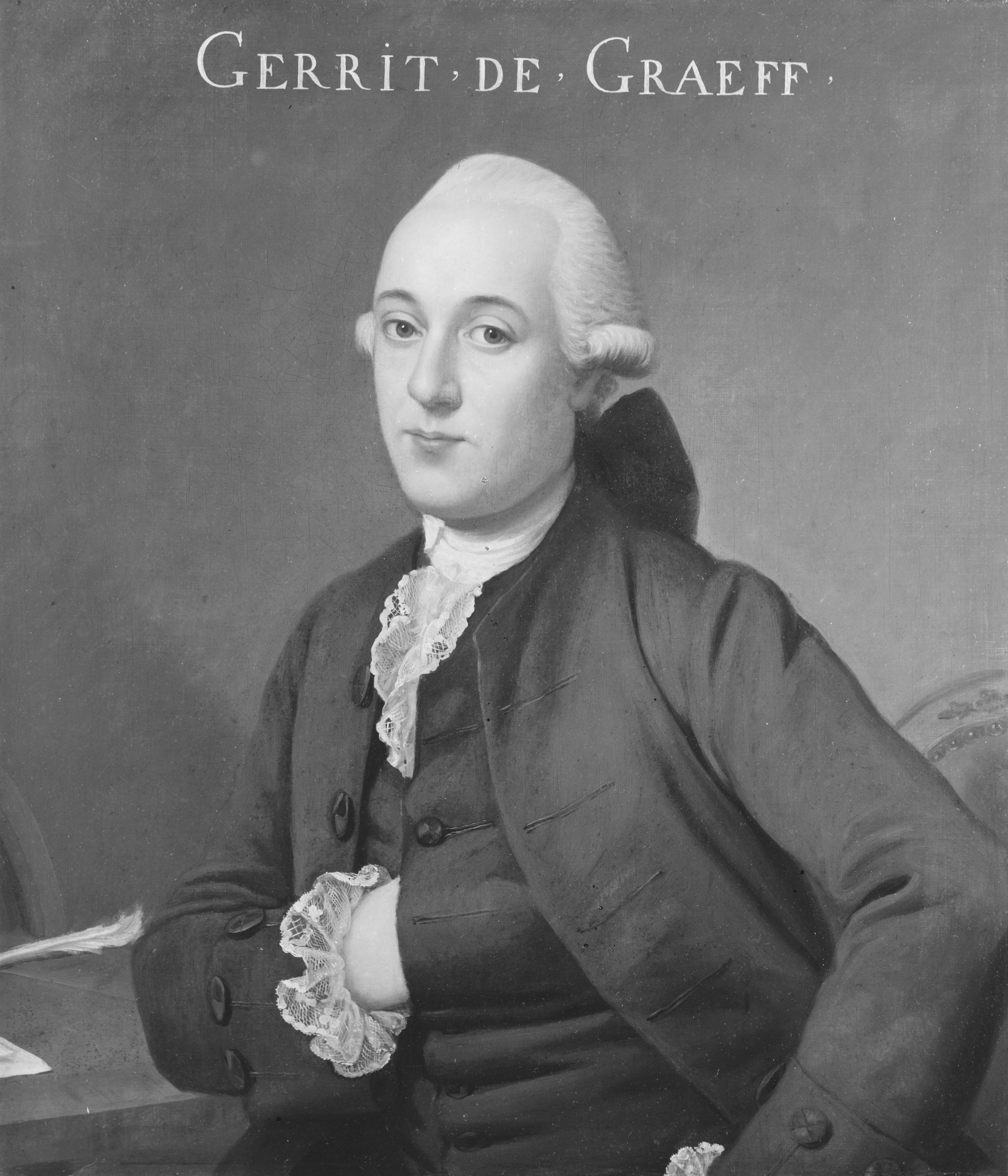

Chairman of the Dutch East Indies Company and the Dutch West Indies Company
- In office 1736 / 1737 – 1752
- Preceded by: Mattheus Lestevenon

Personal details
- Born: 1711 Amsterdam
- Died: 1752 (aged 40–41) Amsterdam
- Party: Dutch States Party
- Spouse: Elizabeth Lestevenon
- Relations: Mattheus Lestevenon (brother in law)
- Children: Geertruid Joanna, Gerrit, Elisabeth Jacoba
- Occupation: Regent, Landlord

Gerrit de Graeff (also Gerrit de Graeff van Zuid-Polsbroek) (27 February 1711 in Amsterdam – 10 November 1752) belonged to the patrician class of Amsterdam and held the feudal titles Free Lord of Zuid-Polsbroek as those of 21st Purmerland and Ilpendam. Known for his wealth and notorious for his stinginess, De Graeff was not particularly popular.

== Family ==
Gerrit was a member of the illustrious De Graeff family from the Dutch Golden Age. His parents where Johan de Graeff and Johanna Hooft. In 1734 he married Maria Elisabeth Sautijn (1709-1736), daughter from Jan Sautijn (burgomaster of Amsterdam) and Constantia Catharina Munter, and in 1739 he remarried Elizabeth Lestevenon (1716–1766). She was a daughter of Abraham Lestevenon (1675-1728) and Geertruid de Vroede (1681-1745) and herself a niece of Mattheus Lestevenon, heer of Strijen, mayor of Amsterdam and Lady Catharina Elisabeth Livingstone (1689-1717; niece of Major-General Sir Thomas Livingstone, 1st Viscount Teviot). The cousin of Elizabeth, Mattheus Lestevenon, was the Dutch ambassador to France.

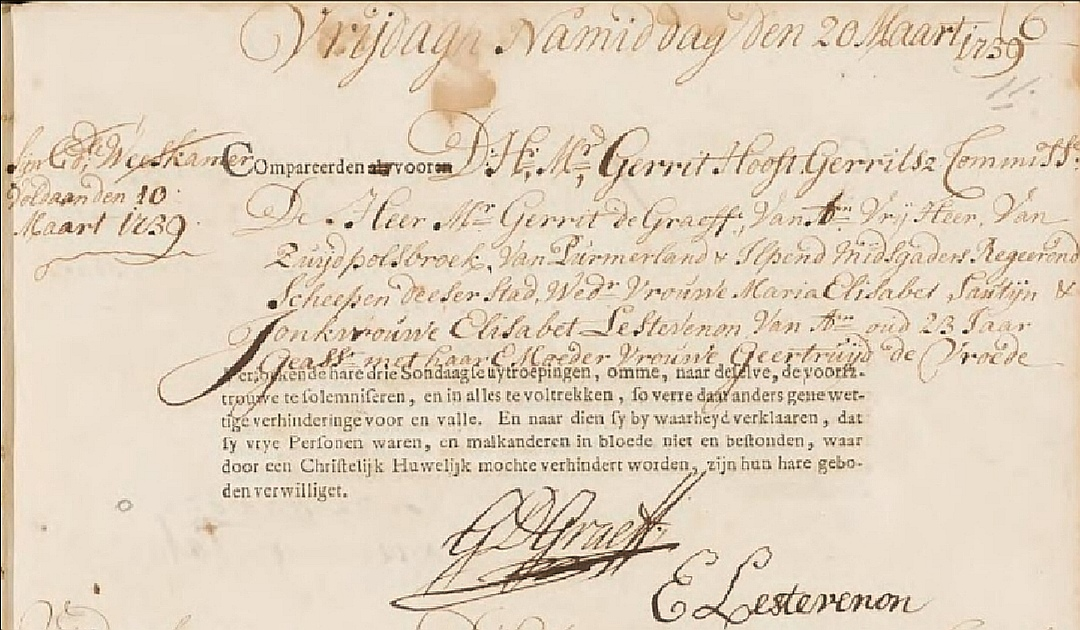
Marriage certificate of Gerrit de Graeff and Elisabeth Lestevenon from 1739

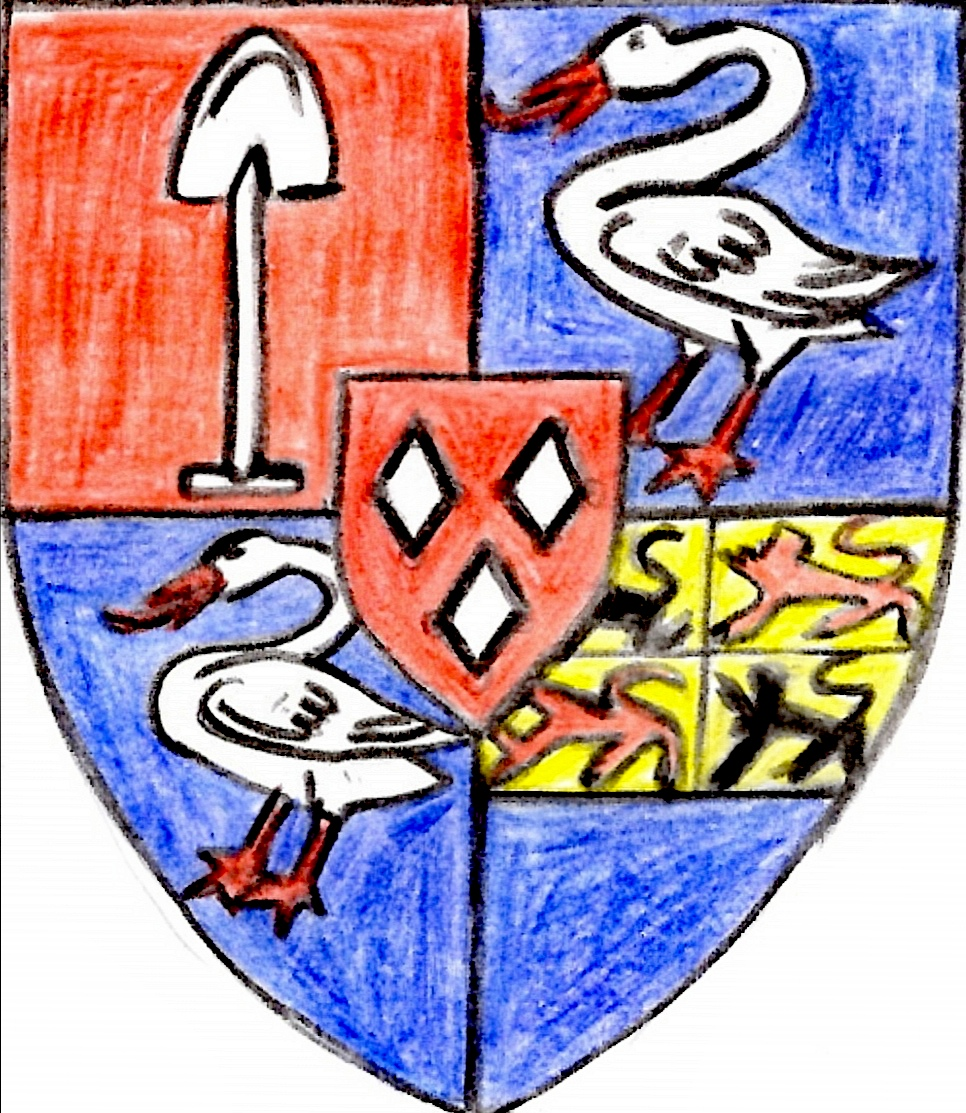
Full coat of arms De Graeff (drawing by Matthias Laurenz Gräff, 2023)

From his first marriage De Graeff had one child, Joan de Graeff (1735-1754), his succeeder as Lord of Zuid-Polsbroek, who died at the age of 19. With his second wife he had six children; Abraham (1743–1744), Pieter (1746–1762) and Elisabeth Jacoba de Graeff (1748–1750) died young. The children who have reached adulthood are:

- Geertruid Joanna de Graeff (1740–1801) was first married to Isaac Ernst des H.R. Rijksbaron de Petersen (1737–1783), Schout-bij-nacht, and in 1790 to Mr François Jacob van de Wall (1756–1834)
- Gerrit de Graeff (1741–1811) married in 1765 Christina van Herzeele (1748–1798)
- Elisabeth Jacoba de Graeff (1751–1802), married in 1768 Jan des H.R. Rijksbaron De Petersen (1745–1786), the younger brother of Isaac Ernst

== Life ==
In 1732 De Graeff finished his studies at the University of Leiden. In 1736 he became one of the chairmen of the Dutch East Indies Company (VOC). One year later he was also appointed as one of the Chairmen of the Dutch West India Company (WIC). In 1739 he took place in the Amsterdam city government as a member of the vroedschap and Schepen. He acted also as captain of the schutterij. In 1742 his income was estimated at 20,000 to 22,000 guilders annually. From 1748 to 1752 De Graeff was one of the directors of the Company of Surinam and commissaris in Noorderkwartier.

Gerrit de Graeff lived at Herengracht, in a mansion now the Tassenmuseum Hendrikje. In the first half of the 18th century an extensive renovation of the building takes place, particularly of the interiors. In the large period room various ceiling paintings and a mantelpiece with richly carved and gilded ornaments were installed. A richly ornamented chimneypiece in the late Louis XIV style was placed in the small period room. Most of the time he resided at his castle Ilpenstein. He also owned Bronstee, a country estate near Heemstede.

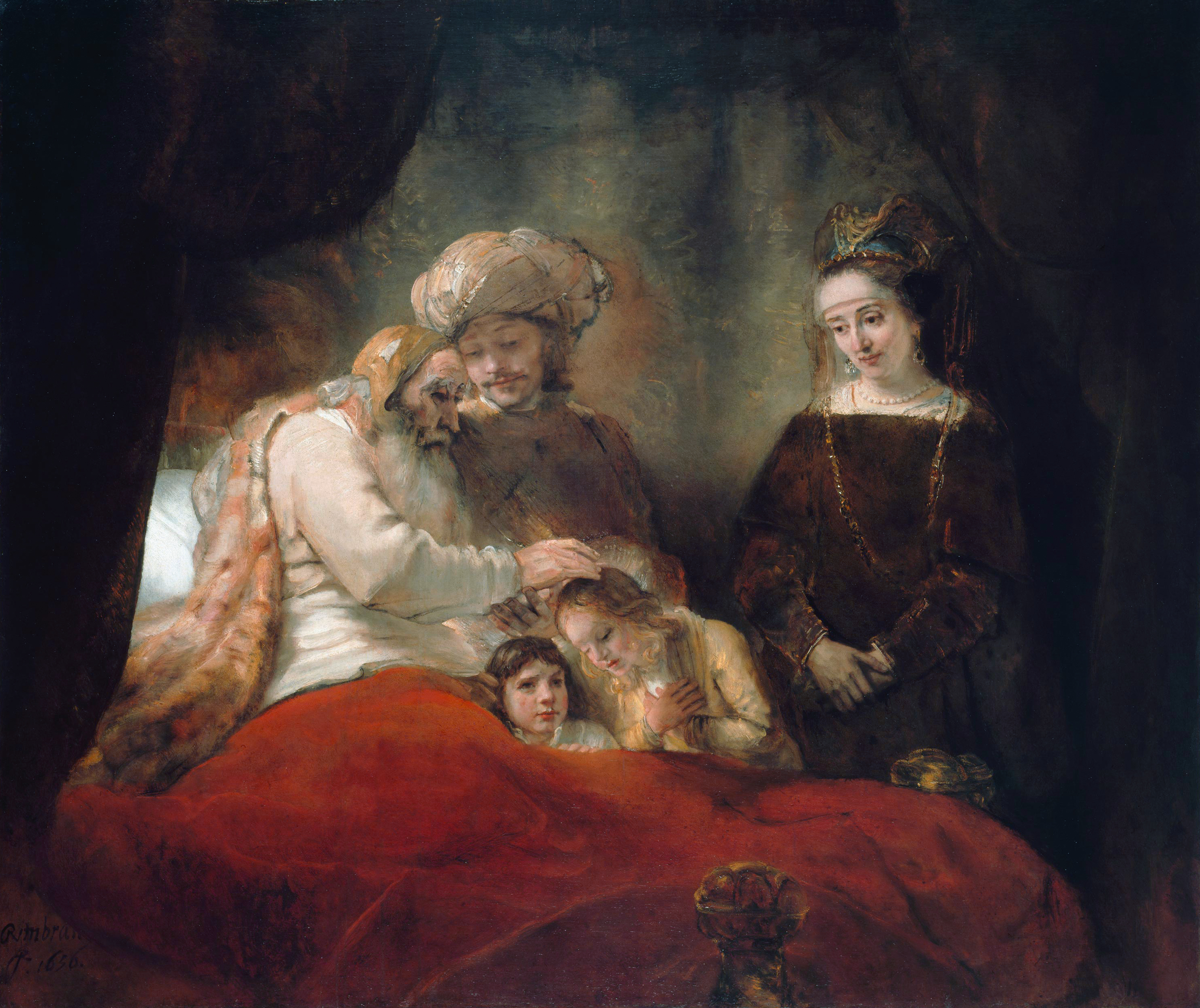
Jacob Blessing the Sons of Joseph by Rembrandt

De Graeff had a huge and valuable art collection, and between 1738 and 1749, he secretly sold various masterpieces of Dutch painting depicting his ancestors to the Hamburg art dealer Anthony Rutgers. This also applies to Rembrandt's painting of Andries de Graeff and Jacob Blessing the Sons of Joseph, which the art dealer sold to Landgrave William VIII, Landgrave of Hesse-Cassel, who used it to decorate his picture gallery at Wilhelmshöhe in Kassel. De Graeff must have known for sure that it was the portrait of his relative Andries de Graeff, but he could not afford to squander his family portraits. The transaction was probably tacit and the portrait anonymous. When Hendrik Pothoven made drawings after portraits from the De Graeff collection for prints by Jacobus Houbraken between 1749 and 1759, he drew Andries de Graeff's bust of Artus Quellinus, so the painting by Rembrandt was probably no longer in De Graeff's collection at the time.

Gerrit de Graeff died on november 12, 1752 at Ilpenstein. His burial chapel is located in the Reformed Church in Ilpendam. Jacob Bicker Raye wrote in his diary about De Graeff's death:

Op 10 November is de Edl. Achtb. Heer Mr. Gerrit de Graeff, Vrijheer van Zuid Polsbroek, Heer van Purmerland en Ilpendam, na lange, zeer zware en ellendige pijnen te hebben uitgestaan, op een zeer jammerlijke wijze overleden. Hij was omtrent 43 jaar oud. Bij zijn eerste vrouw heeft hij een zoon en bij zijn tweede vrouw, die nog leeft, heeft hij diverse geprocureert (waarvan slechts drie den volwassen leeftijd bereikten). Hij laat een schat van gelt naar, dog was uytermaate suynig, beknibbelde ider ter alder scharpste, gunde een ander niets, benijdende een iders welvaart, en hat plisier om die geene, daar hij over gestelt was, haar inkomen en emolumente te besnoyje, bedisputeeren en te verminderen, sodat hij, na gedachte, van seer weinige, als hij niemandt goet deet (als zeer gedwongen) betreurt sal worden.

== Titles ==
Gerrit de Graeff (I.) van Zuid-Polsbroek House De Graeff Born: 27 February 1711 Died: 10 November 1752
Regnal titles
Preceded by Johan de Graeff	Free Lord of Zuid-Polsbroek; 1714–1752	Succeeded by Joan de Graeff
Preceded by Cornelis de Graeff II.	21st Lord of the Free and high Lordship Purmerland and Ilpendam; 1719–1721, 1721-1752	Succeeded by Agneta de Graeff (1721)

== Literature ==
- Graeff, P. de (P. de Graeff Gerritsz en Dirk de Graeff van Polsbroek) Genealogie van de familie De Graeff van Polsbroek, Amsterdam 1882.
- Bruijn, J. H. de Genealogie van het geslacht De Graeff van Polsbroek 1529/1827, met bijlagen. De Bilt 1962–63.
- Moelker, H.P. De heerlijkheid Purmerland en Ilpendam (1978 Purmerend)
- Elias, J.E., De Vroedschap van Amsterdam 1578–1795 (1903–1905 Haarlem), p. 693.
