= Mattheus Lestevenon =

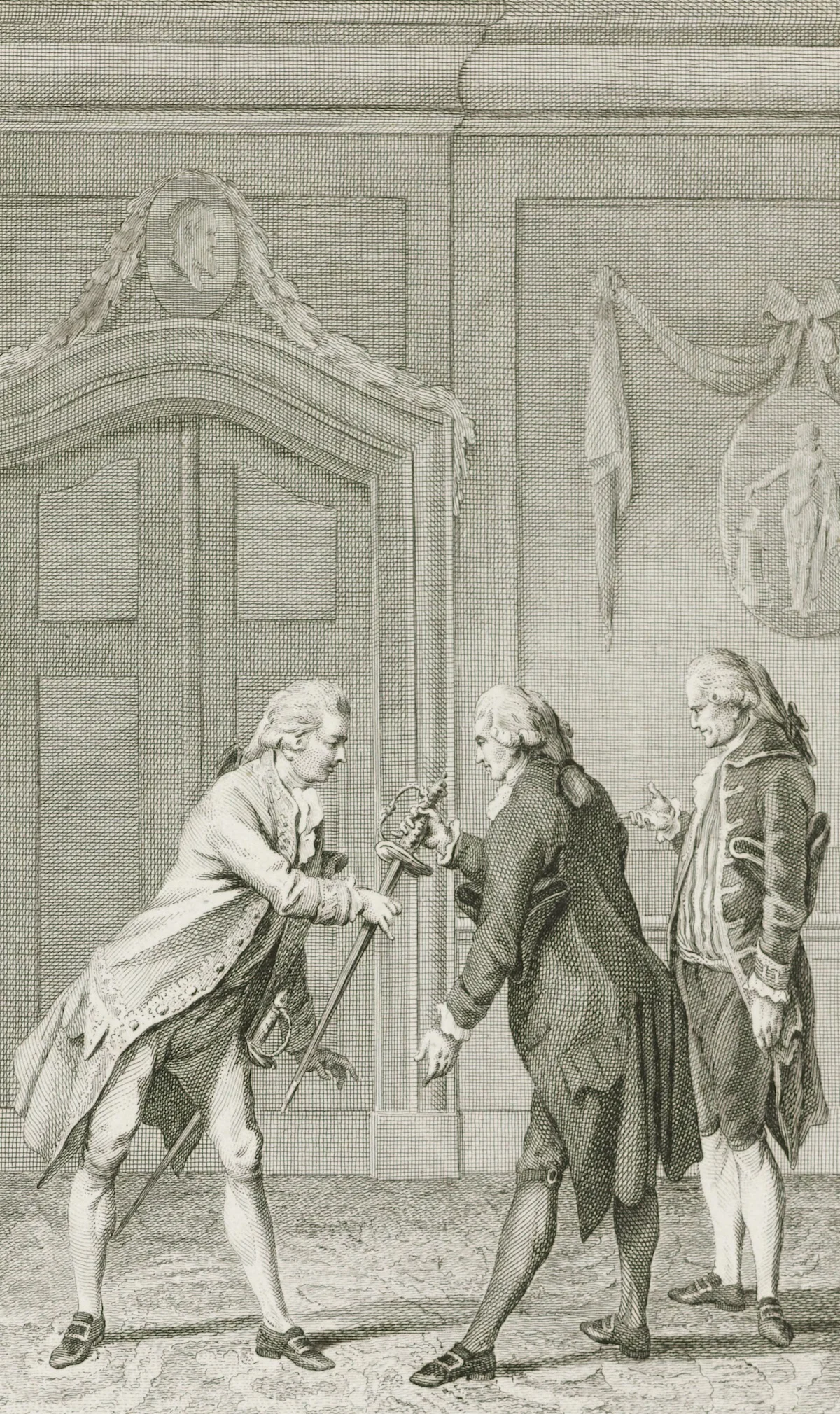
Lestevenon and Gerard Brantsen presenting Pierre André de Suffren with a golden sword in 1784

Mattheus Lestevenon, heer van Berckenrode (8 February 1715 – 13 January 1797) was a Dutch diplomat. He was city-secretary and schepen in Amsterdam, then Dutch ambassador to France. Lestevenon played an important role in the year 1748 and in the negotiations for the Treaty of Paris. Pietro Locatelli dedicated six violin sonatas to him.

== Life ==
=== Family ===
Lestevenon was born into a powerful regent family. His father Mattheus Lestevenon (1674-1743) was an administrator of the Dutch East India Company, heer of Strijen and five-times mayor of Amsterdam (between 1722 and 1736). Gerrit de Graeff (I.) van Zuid-Polsbroek, vrijheer van Zuid-Polsbroek, was his cousin by marriage. In 1743 Lestevenon had married Maria Wilhelmina, baroness van der Duyn. His two children Maria Jacqueline and Willem Anne Lestevenon were born in 1749 in Brussels and Paris respectively. On 8 June 1755 he divorced the baroness, probably while she conceived a child from an officer by the name M. De Villegagnon. Lestevenon next married Susanna Faulquier in an unknown year. He sold his house on Keizersgracht to Thomas Hope. It's the building at Singel 292, that he had inherited from his grandfather Dirk Trip, he sold to Joachim Rendorp. After an inheritance from a late aunt, Lestevenon bought a palace at Lange Voorhout on the Hague, with 16 servants. Mattheus Lestevenon married Lady Catharina Windsor, a sister of Herbert Windsor, 2nd Viscount Windsor, in London in 1742 and went on honeymoon to Italy. His wife died of smallpox on the return trip. She was buried in Bockenheim on 26 May. Mattheus again inherited "considerable wealth and goods" ("considerabel veel gelt en goet") on the death of his father in 1743. He moved to the attractive building at Keizersgracht 444–446. Because he was not appointed as a successor to his father, it is supposed he was frustrated.

Nota : afin de compléter les informations ci-dessus, il serait nécessaire de se référer au récent article (et contenant des informations totalement inédites sur Marie-Jacqueline (de) Lestevenon et sur son frère Willem-Anne Lestevenon, ambassadeur) publié dans la revue intitulée Le Parchemin, OGHB (Office royal Généalogique et Héraldique de Belgique), Juillet-Août 2024, n°472, par l'archéologue et historien (Spé. Conflits militaires) Guilhem de MAURAIGE, Biographie bruxelloise, Pierre-Dominique PREVOST (1748-1807), général de la Révolution et de l'Empire, chevalier de Saint-Louis, commandeur de la Légion d'honneur, allié à la famille Lestevenon de Berkenroode, pp.292-306. Lien internet : Le Parchemin 472 (Juillet-Août 2024) | OGHB et complément informatif (sépulture de Côni), Le Parchemin 474bis (Novembre-Décembre 2024) OGHB, p.643. / Idem. Informations inédites concernant les enfants de Pierre-Dominique Prévost et de Marie-Jacqueline Lestevenon).

=== Career ===
In 1729, he got a job as city secretary. In all probability, someone else did the work and Lestevenon's earnings funded his Studie. Lestevenon was appointed schepen of Amsterdam in 1745.

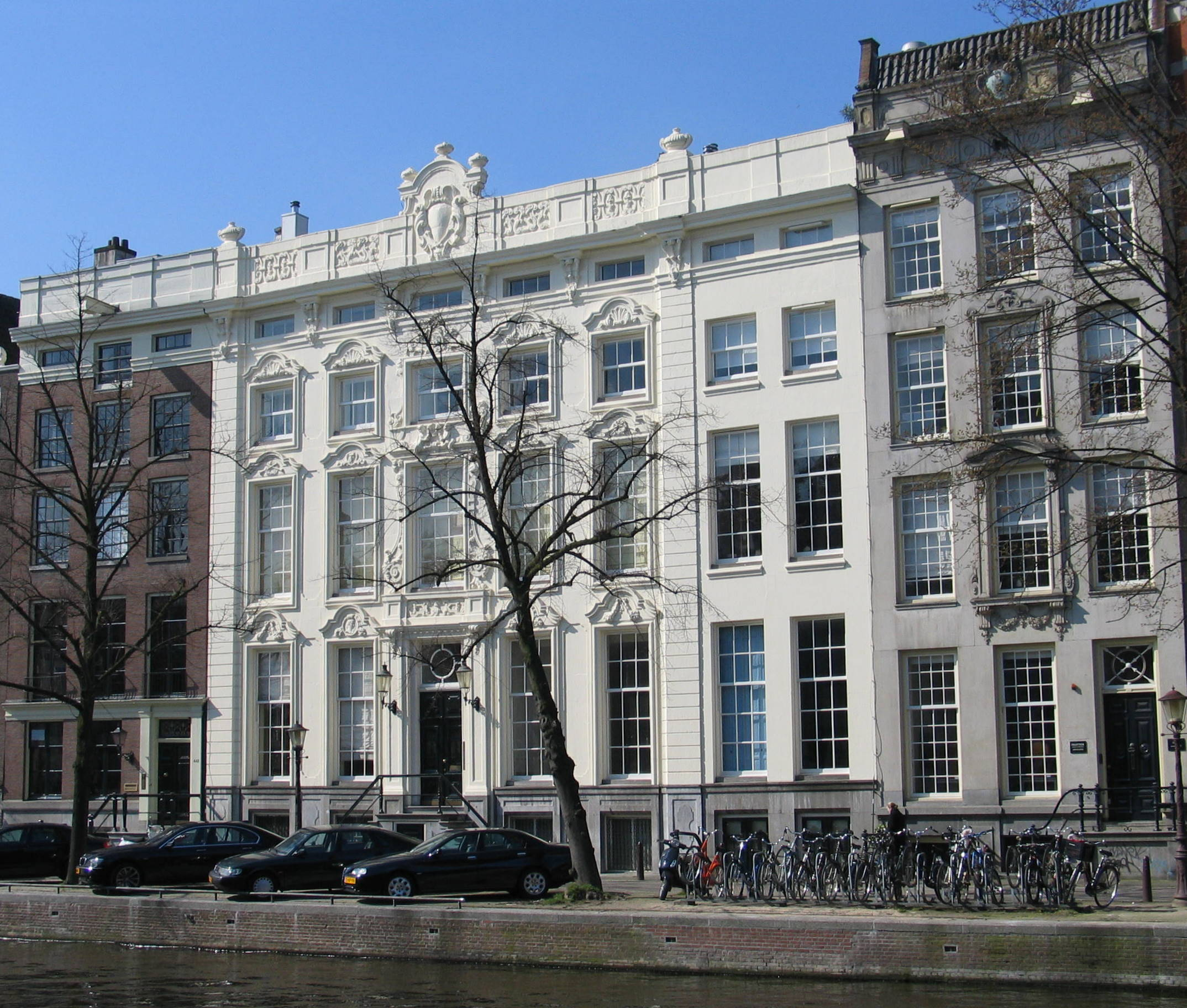
His mansion on Keizersgracht

After the Pachtersoproer (1748), the Doelisten invited prince William IV and requested to remove the inter-related regenten clique and to change the appointment of mayors. Of the forty mayors chosen between 1696–1748, only two (or, as some maintain, even just one) were not related to earlier mayors. Finally Lestevenon left the council of his own accord. The stadholder changed his opinion and more than half the men on the council got their seats back. Not long after that Mattheus Lestevenon was appointed ambassador to the court to Versailles.

Little is known about his activities as ambassador. Mostly it involved meetings with La Vauguyon on finishing the Fourth Anglo-Dutch War (1780–1784) and the Treaty of Fontainebleau (1785); his correspondence with Comte de Montmorin ends in 1788? Mattheus Lestevenon died in 1797 in the Hague. His son meanwhile played an important role as a Patriot.

== Bibliography ==
- J.E. Elias (1903–1905, reprinted 1963) De vroedschap van Amsterdam 1578-1795, 2 vols.
- Het dagboek van J. Bicker Raye; bewerkt door F. M. Bijerinck & M. G. de Boer, (1935).
- Ligtelijn, M. (2006) "Regentencoterieën 1650–1750". In: De Gouden Bocht van Amsterdam, p. 187. Edited and composed by Milko den Leeuw en Martin Pruijs.
