= Johan de Graeff =

Dutch patrician (1673–1714)

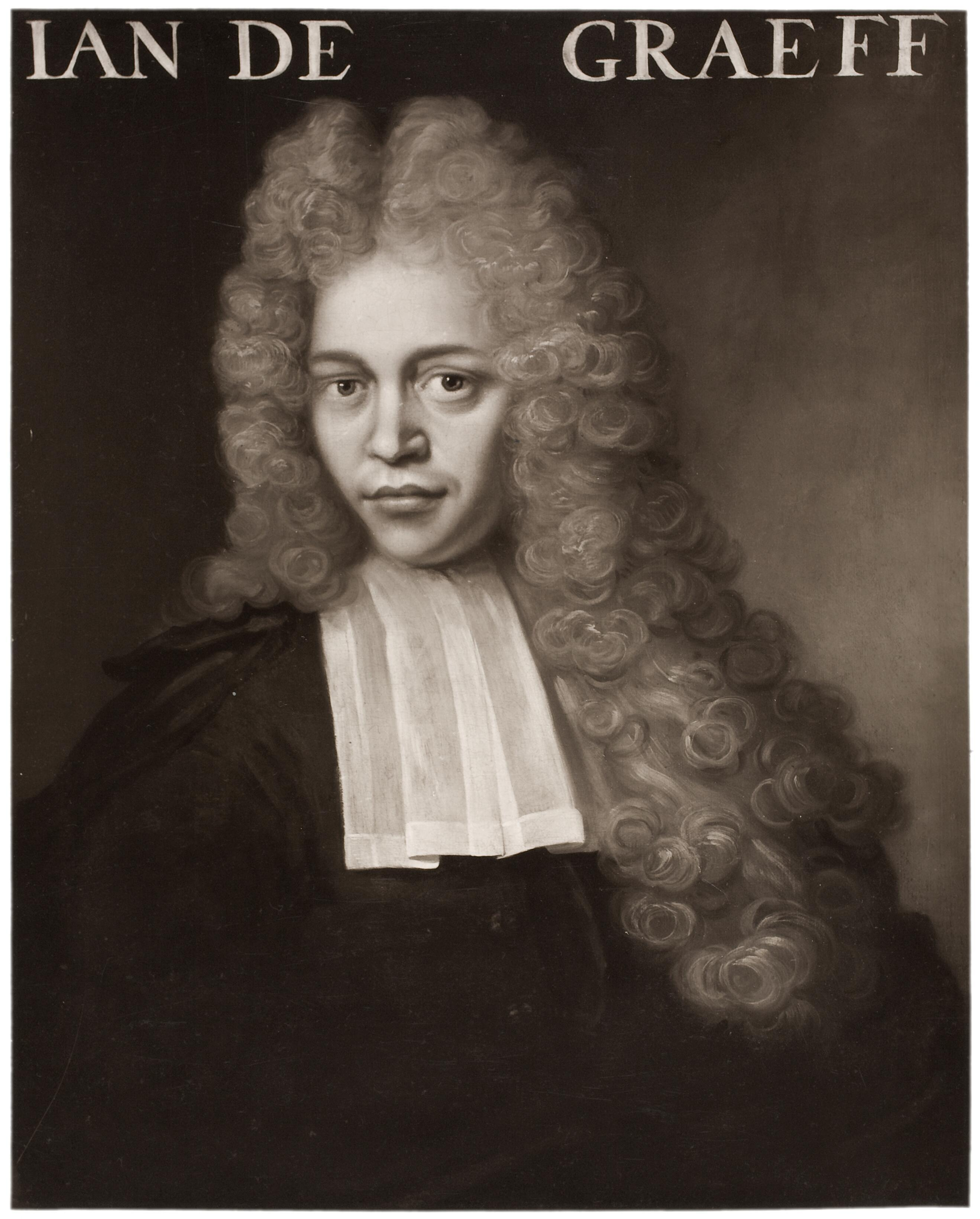
Johan de Graeff (unknown artist, ca 1700)

Johan de Graeff, also Jan de Graeff (29 October 1673 in Amsterdam – 12 April 1714) - patrician of Amsterdam, Free Lord of Zuid-Polsbroek - was a member of the De Graeff - family from the Dutch Golden Age. His political Position was that of the Dutch States Party.

== Life ==
Johan was the oldest son of Pieter de Graeff and his cousin Jacoba Bicker, sister of Wendela Bicker, who was married to Grand Pensionary Johan de Witt. He was given his first name Johan in memory of De Witt, who was murdered in Rampjaar 1672. His elder brother was Cornelis de Graeff II. who became Free Lord of Purmerland and Ilpendam, his younger sister Agneta de Graeff was married to Jan Baptiste de Hochepied, who lives in a City-Place in The Hague today called Kabinet der Koningin.

After his studies at the University of Leiden in the year 1699, he became an advisor and from 1709 to 1714 a member of the vroedschap of the City of Amsterdam.

De Graeff residence at the Herengracht in a house now called Tassenmuseum Hendrikje, at castle Ilpenstein and at Bronstee, a Countryhouse near Heemstede.

In the year 1709 Johan married Johanna Hooft, they had five children:

- Jacoba Adriana de Graeff (1710–1745), married to Mr Jacob Jan de Blocq van Kuffeler, deputy of Frisia
- Gerrit de Graeff I (1711–1752), married to Maria Elisabeth Sautijn and later with Elisabeth Lestevenon; Gerrit succeeded him as Lord of Zuid-Polsbroek
- Alida Joanna de Graeff (1713–1757), married with Mr François de Witt, burgomaster of Amsterdam

== Art collection ==
Johan de Graeff has a big art collection including paintings from Rembrandt van Rijn, Gerard Ter Borch and Jacob van Ruisdael. The best known pictures in the collection include: Catharina Hooft with her Nurse, painted by Frans Hals, Jacob Blessing the Sons of Joseph and Portrait of Andries de Graeff, both from Rembrandt.

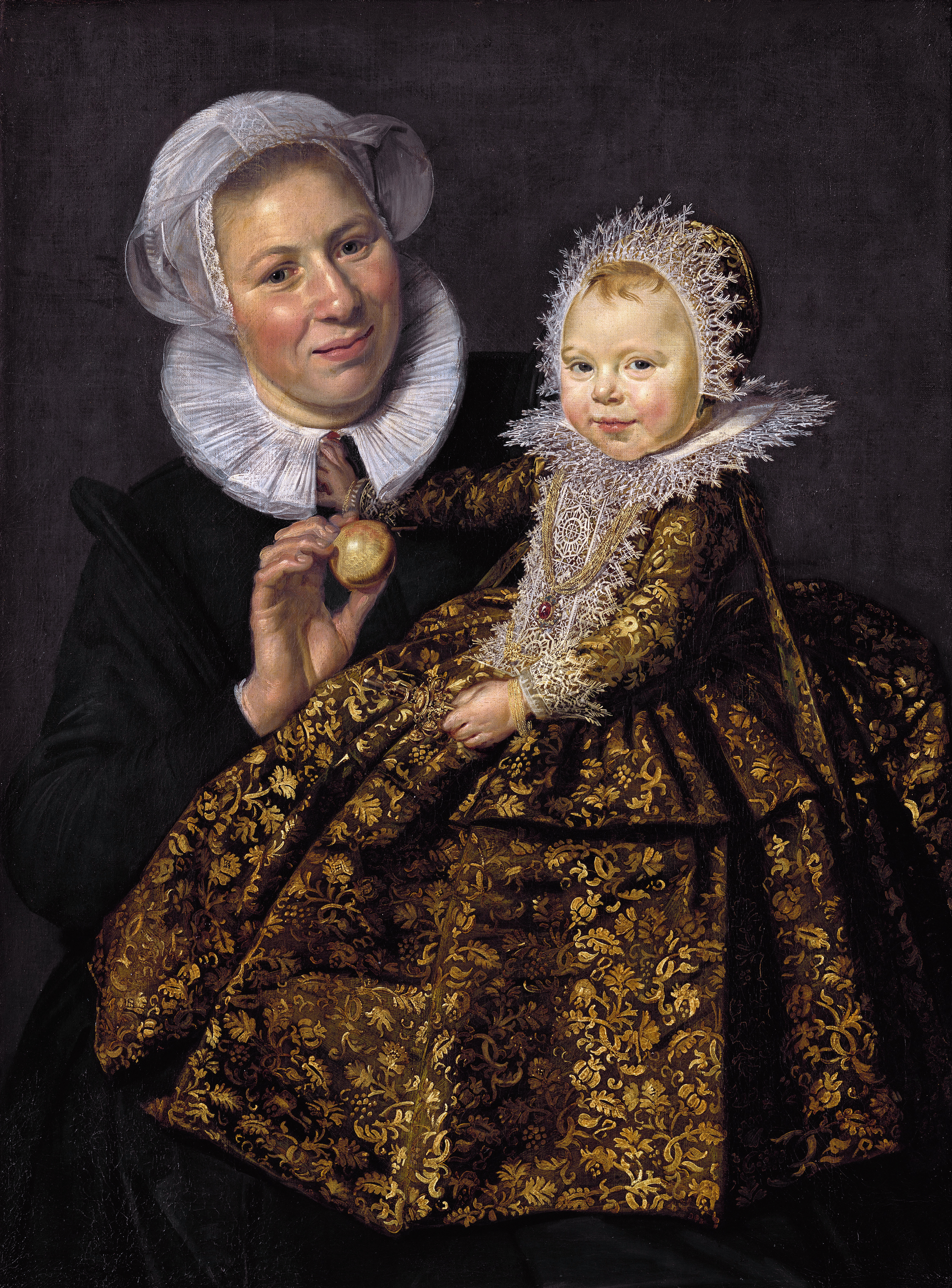
Johan de Graeffs Grandmother Catharina Hooft as a child, by Frans Hals (1619)

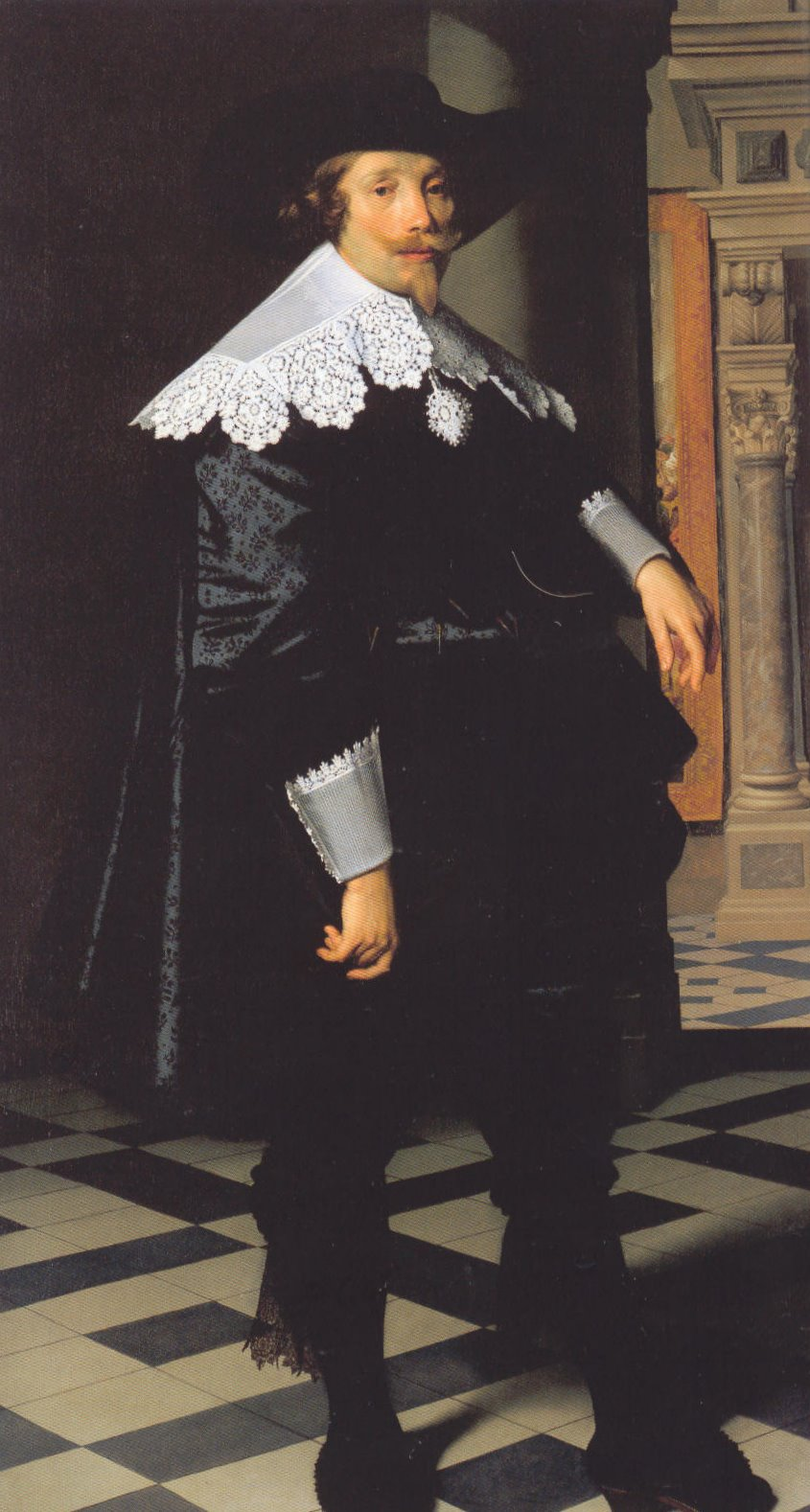
Cornelis de Graeff, painted by Nicolaes Eliaszoon Pickenoy, Gemäldegalerie, Berlin, (1636)

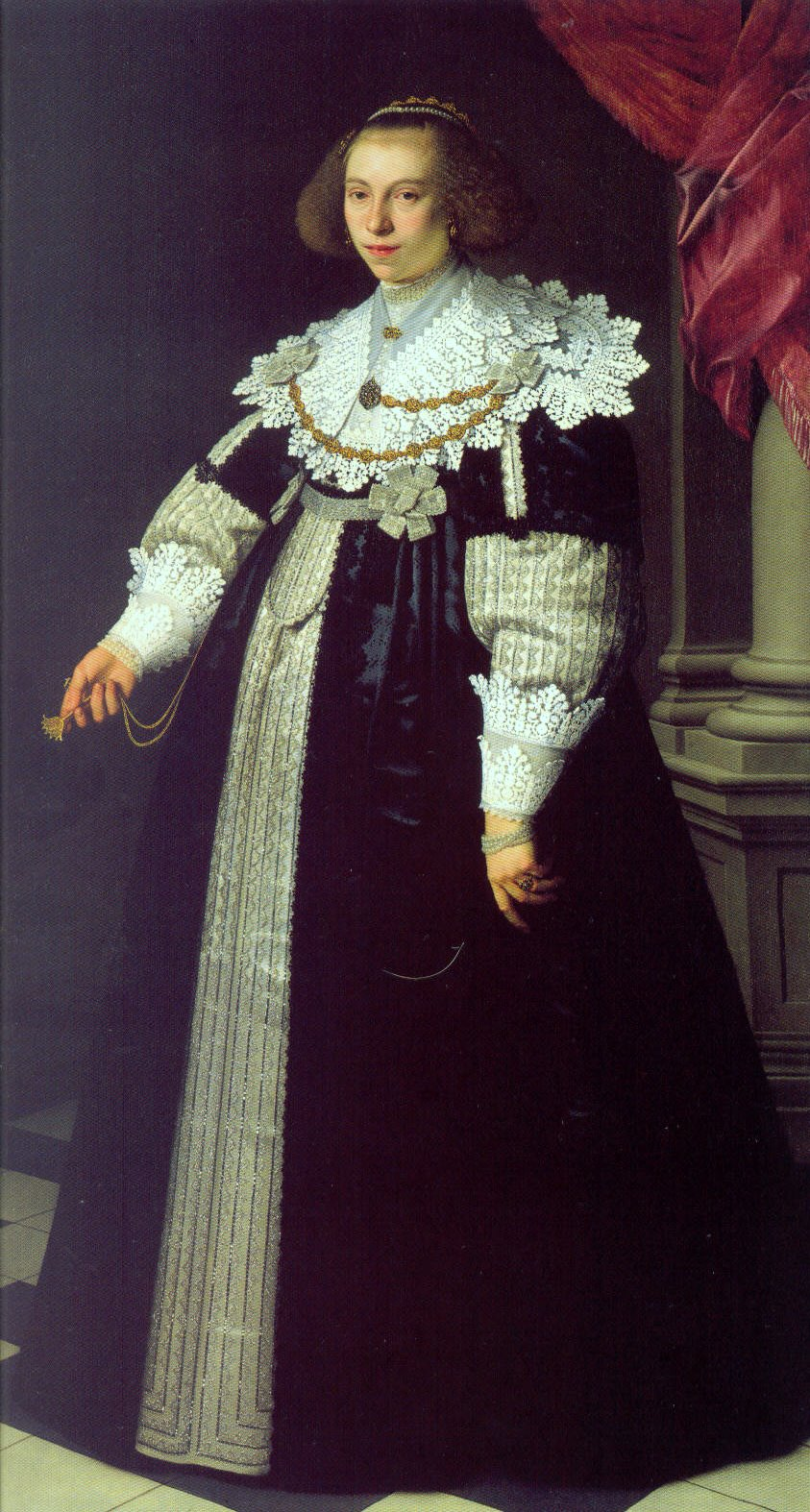
Catharina Hooft - second wife of Cornelis de Graeff, painted by Nicolaes Eliasz. Pickenoy (1636)

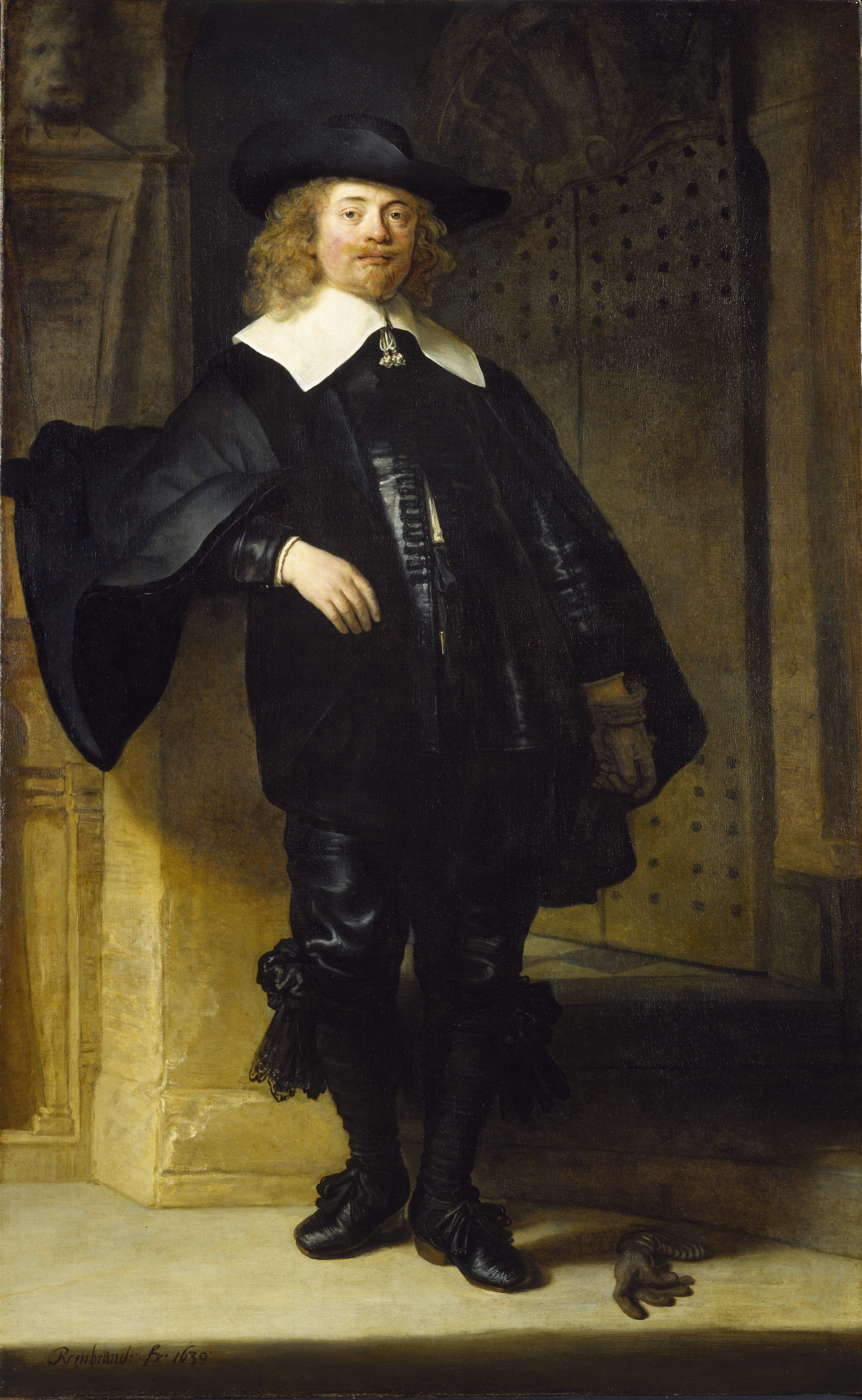
Andries de Graeff, painted by Rembrandt in 1639

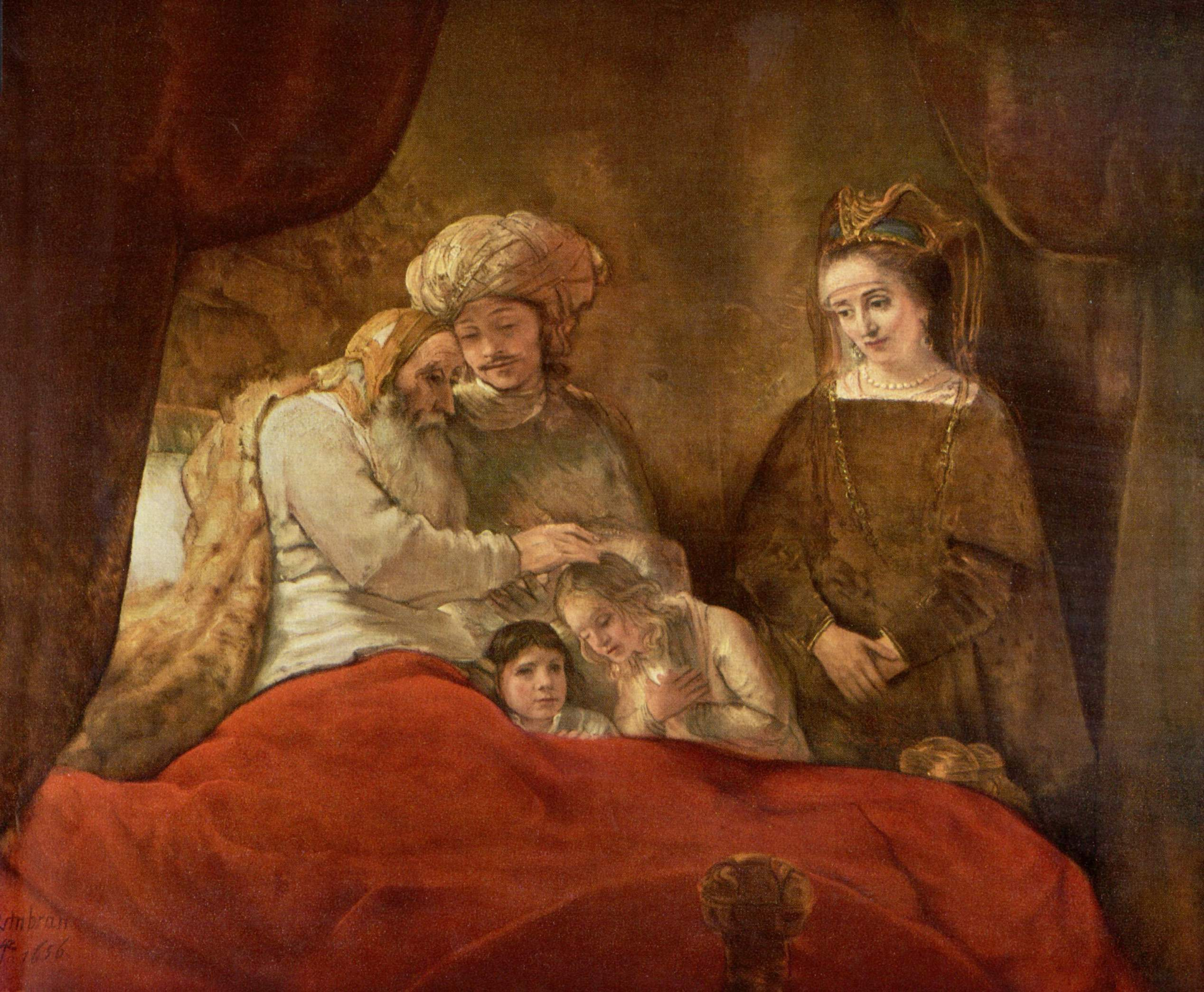
Jacob Blessing the Sons of Joseph by Rembrandt (Portrait of Petrus Scriverius, Wendela de Graeff and their sons) (Rembrandt, 1656)

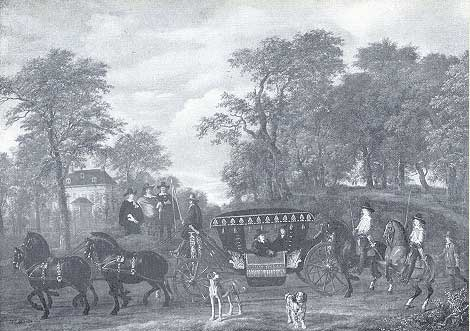
Cornelis de Graeff at Soestdijk, painted by Jacob van Ruisdael (1656-1660)

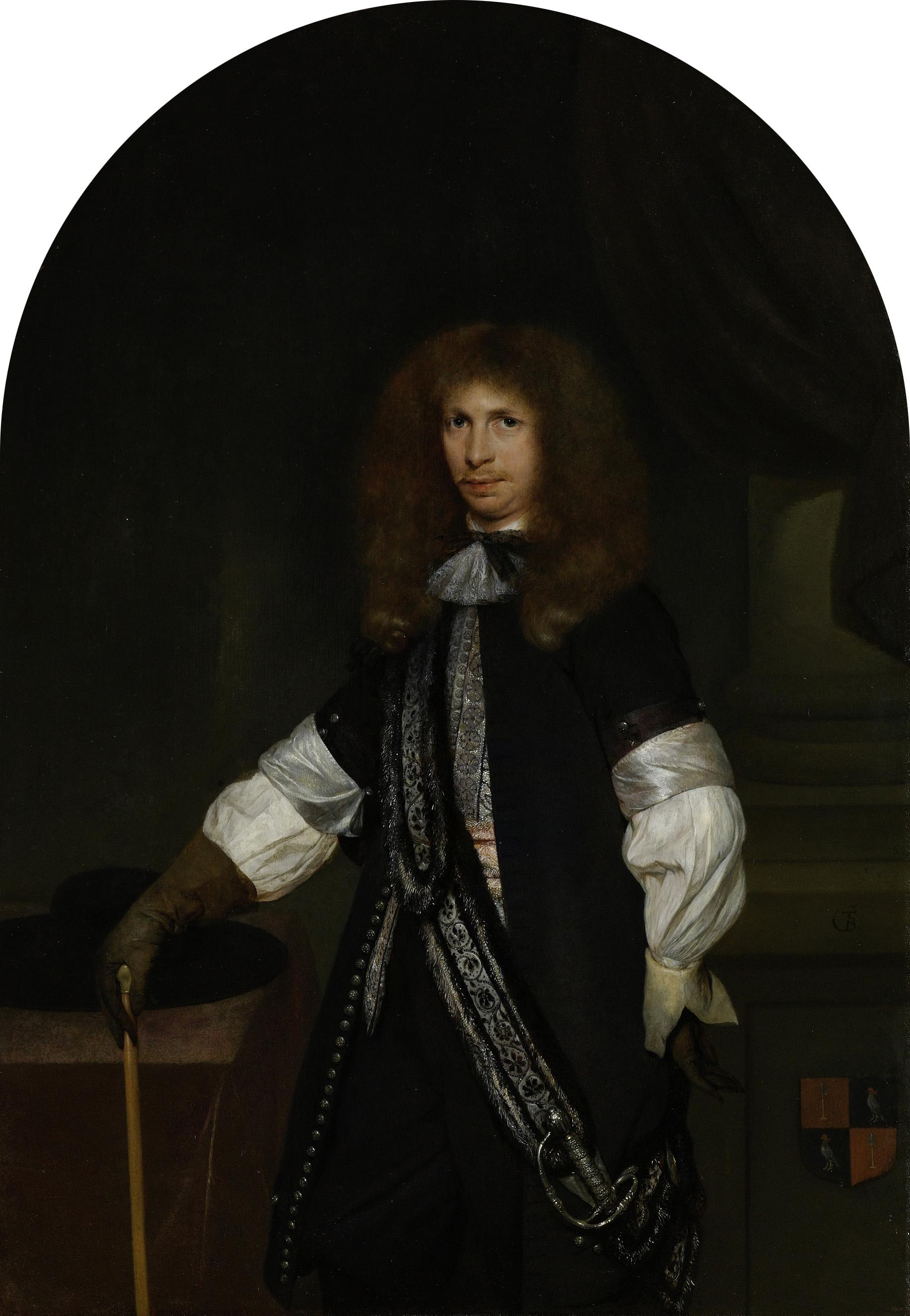
Portrait of Jacob de Graeff (1642-1690), painted by Gerard ter Borch (second half 17th century)

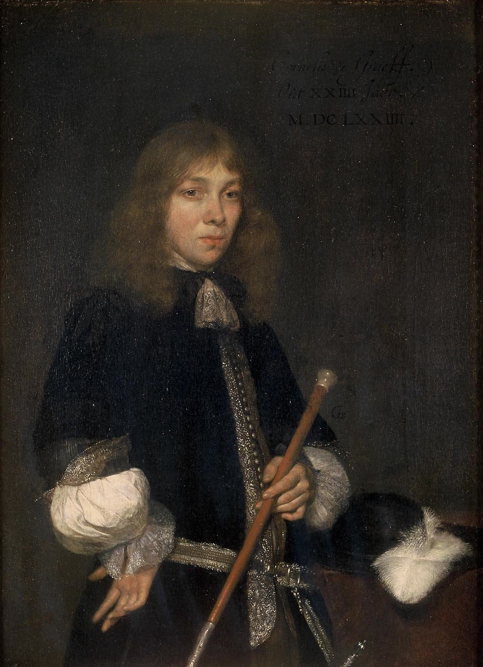
Portrait of Cornelis HrR Ridder de Graeff (1650-1678), painted by Gerard Terborch (1673)

== Coat of arms ==
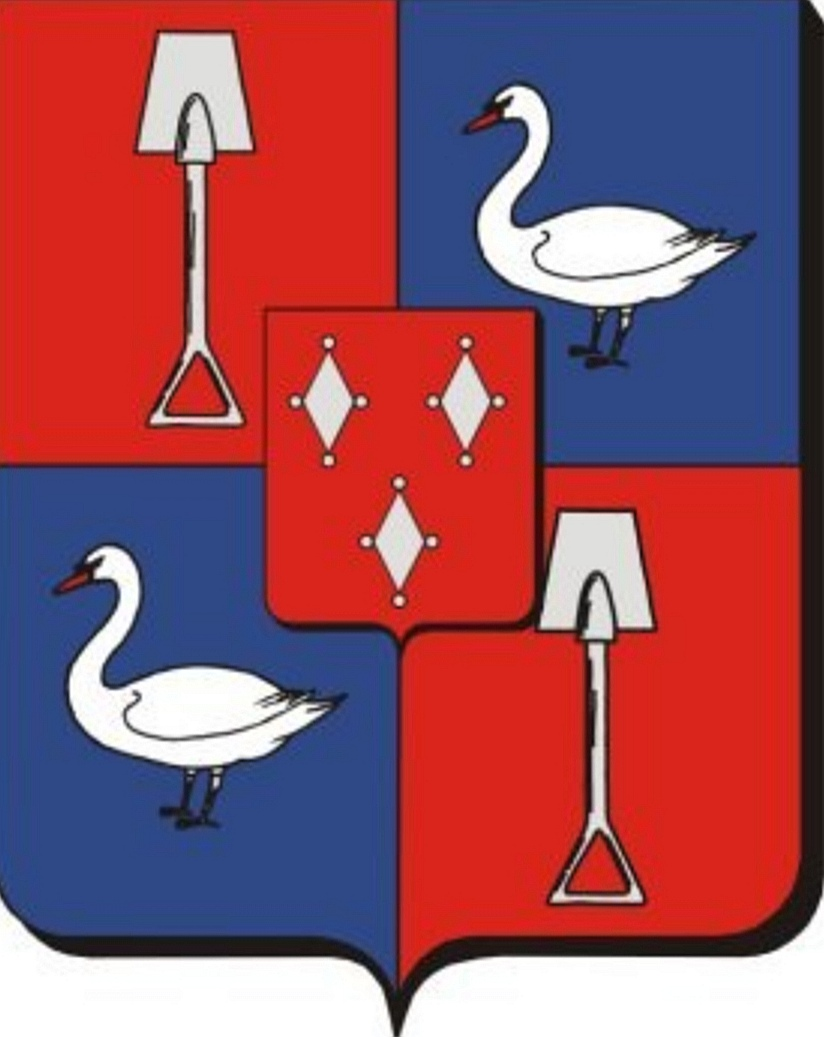
Coat of arms of Free Lord of Zuid-Polsbroek

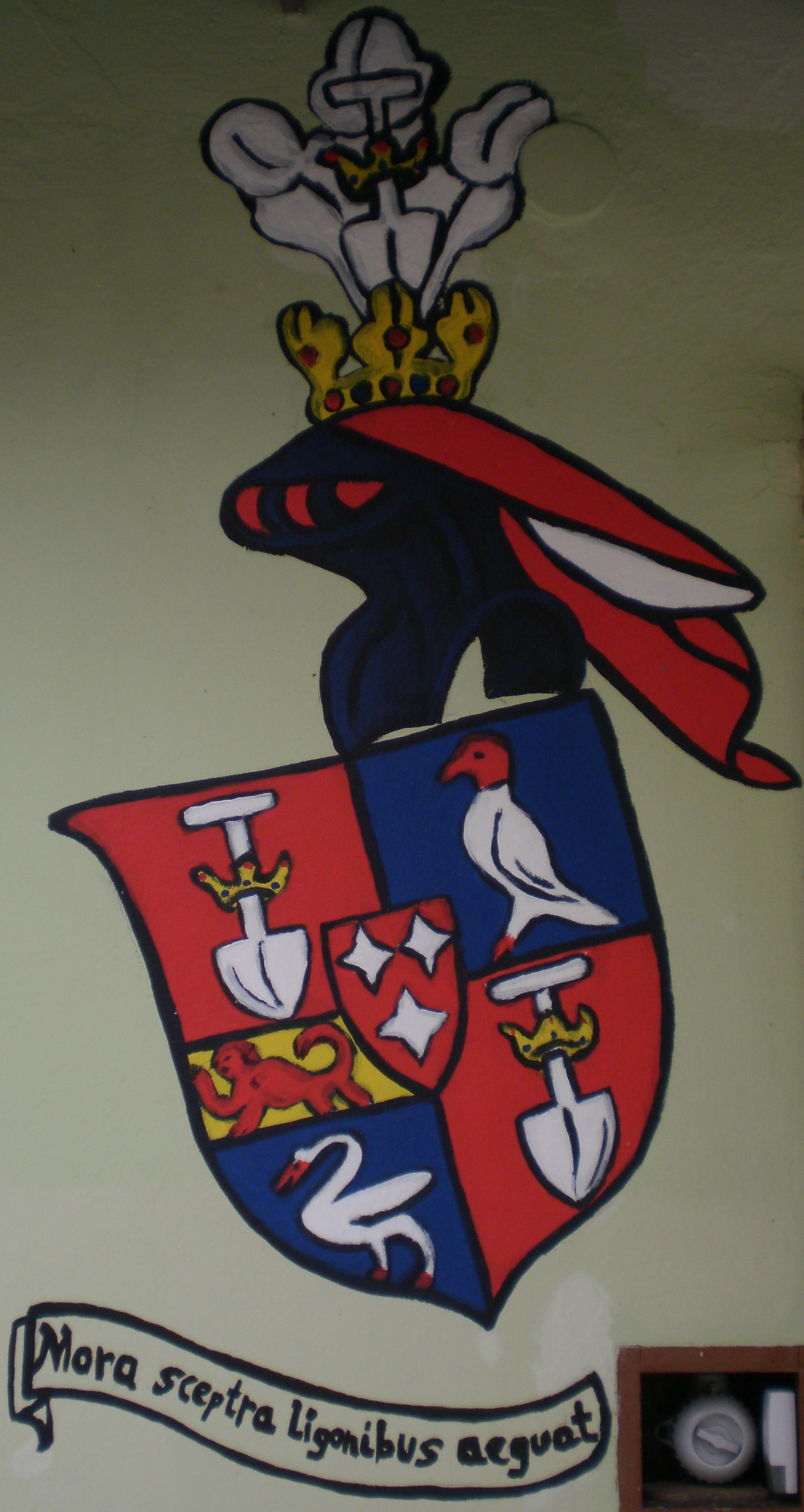
full coat of arms De Graeff (painted by Matthias Laurenz Gräff, 2011)

The personal coat of arms of Johan de Graeff is quarterd with a heart shield and shows the following symbols:

- heart shield shows the three silver rhombuses on red (originally from the family Van Woerdern van Vliet) of the High Lordship Zuid-Polsbroek
- field 1 (left above) shows the silver shovel on red of their paternal ancestors, the Herren von Graben
- field 2 (right above) shows the silver swan on blue of the Fief Vredenhof [or that one (Waterland) of their maternal ancestors, the De Grebber family
- field 3 (left below), same as field 2
- field 4 (right below), same as field 1
- helmet covers in red and silver
- helm adornment shows an upright silver spade with ostrich feathers (Herren von Graben)
- motto: MORS SCEPTRA LIGONIBUS AEQUAT (DEATH MAKES SEPTRES AND HOES EQUAL)

== Title ==
Johan de Graeff House De Graeff Born: 29 October 1673 Died: 12 April 1714
Dutch nobility
Preceded by Pieter de Graeff	Free Lord of Zuid-Polsbroek; 1707–1714	Succeeded by Gerrit de Graeff I

== Literature ==
- Graeff, P. de (P. de Graeff Gerritsz en Dirk de Graeff van Polsbroek) Genealogie van de familie De Graeff van Polsbroek, Amsterdam 1882.
- Bruijn, J. H. de Genealogie van het geslacht De Graeff van Polsbroek 1529/1827, met bijlagen. De Built 1962-63.
- Moelker, H.P. De heerlijkheid Purmerland en Ilpendam (1978 Purmerend)
