= Museum of Bags and Purses =

- Tassenmuseum Amsterdam
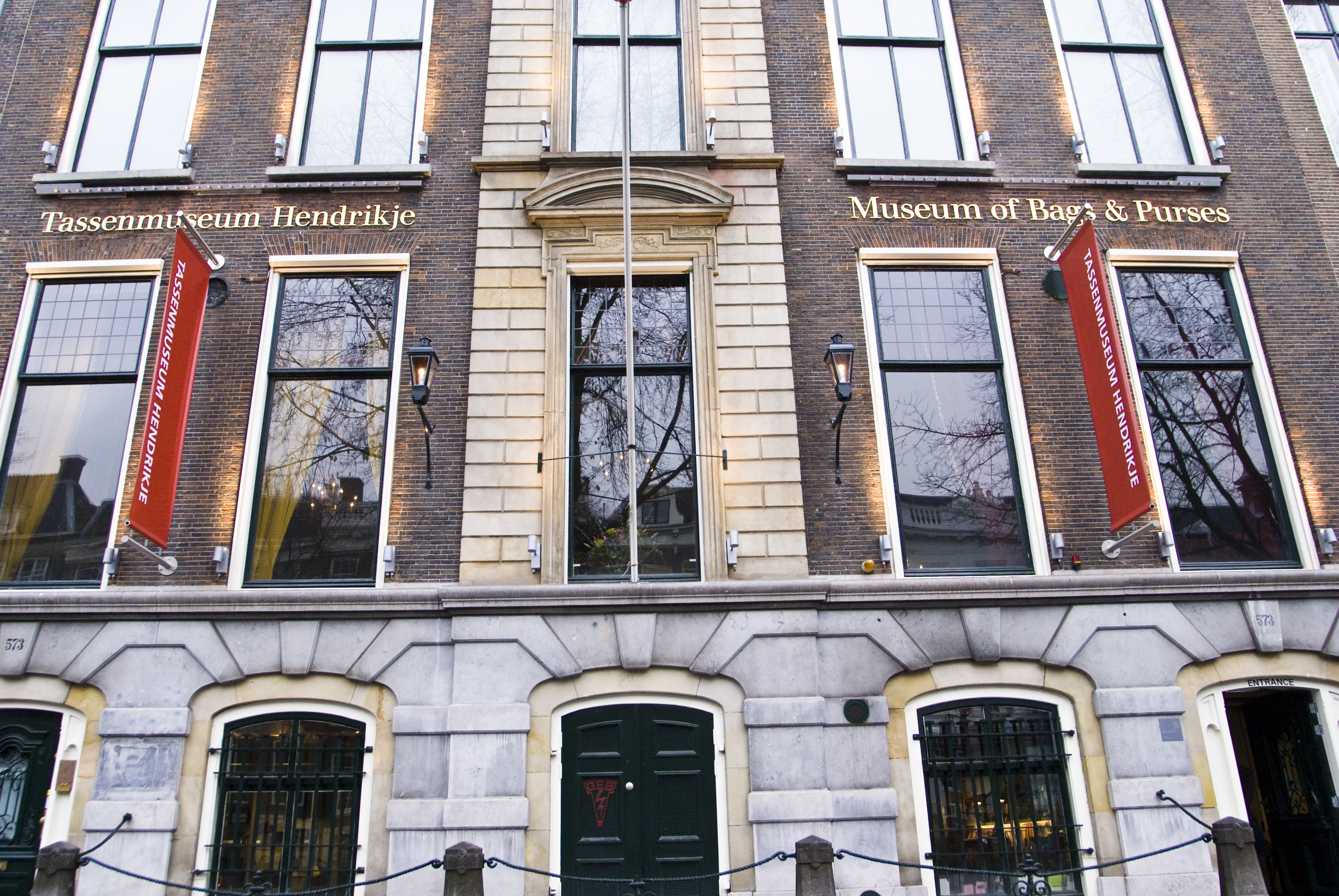
- Museum of Bags and Purses, Herengracht, Amsterdam

- Location within the city center of Amsterdam
- Former name: Tassenmuseum Hendrikje
- Established: 1996; current location 2007
- Dissolved: April 2020
- Location: Herengracht 573; Amsterdam, Netherlands
- Coordinates: 52.365938°N 4.896782°E
- Type: Fashion Museum
- Key holdings: Margaret Thatcher's handbag, early pieces from Hermès, Chanel, and Louis Vuitton, pieces owned by celebrities including Madonna and Elizabeth Taylor
- Collections: Handbags and accessories
- Collection size: 5,000 bags
- Visitors: 85.084 (2014)
- Founder: Sigrid Ivo
- Director: Manon Schaap
- Curator: Leonie Sterenborg
- Public transit access: Rembrandtplein Tramhalte
- Website: tassenmuseum.nl/en/

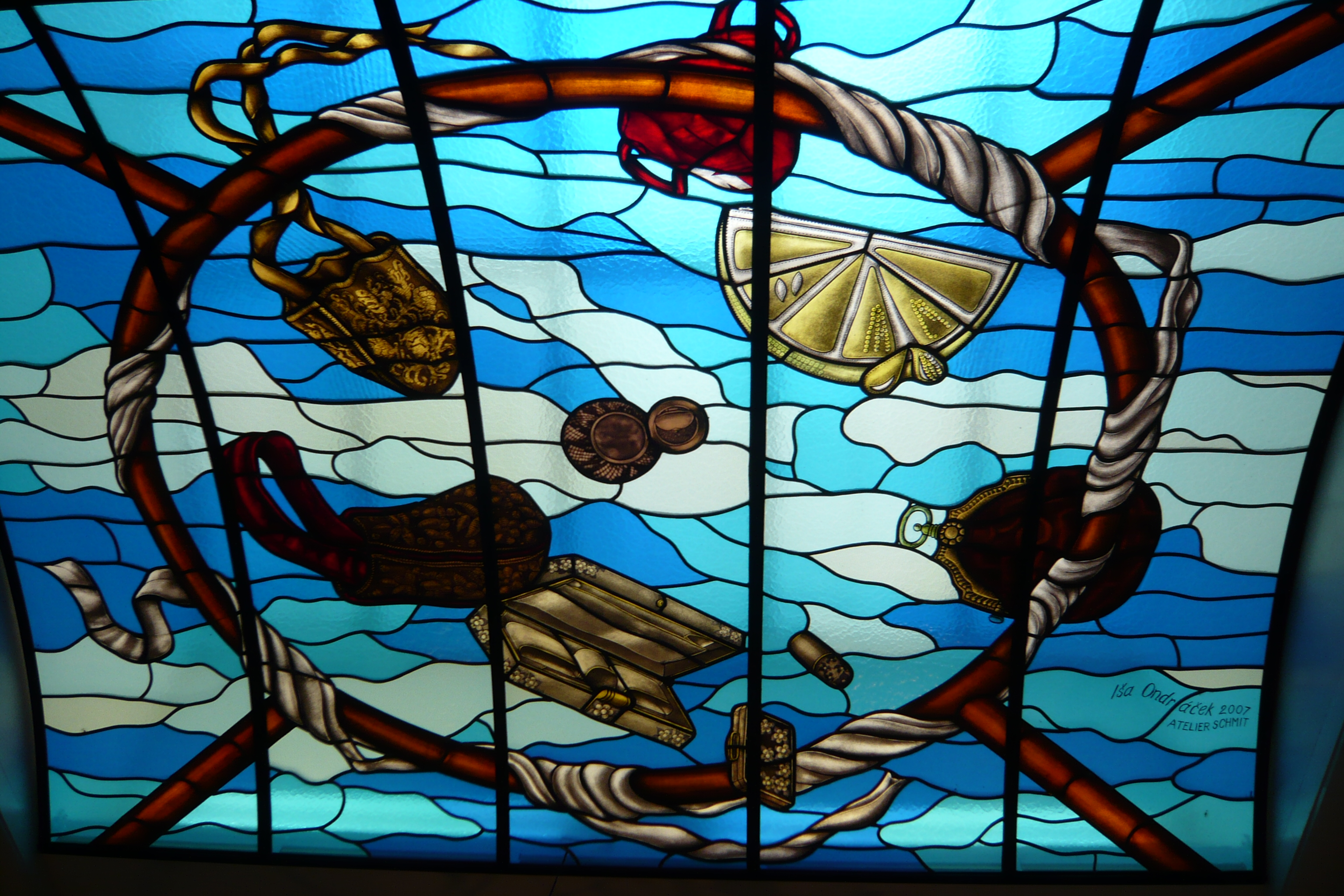
Stained-glass ceiling featuring objects from the collection.

The Museum of Bags and Purses (Dutch: Tassenmuseum Amsterdam), was a museum devoted to the history of bags, purses, and their related accessories. Located in Amsterdam's historic central canal belt, the museum's collection included over 5,000 items dating back to the sixteenth-century.

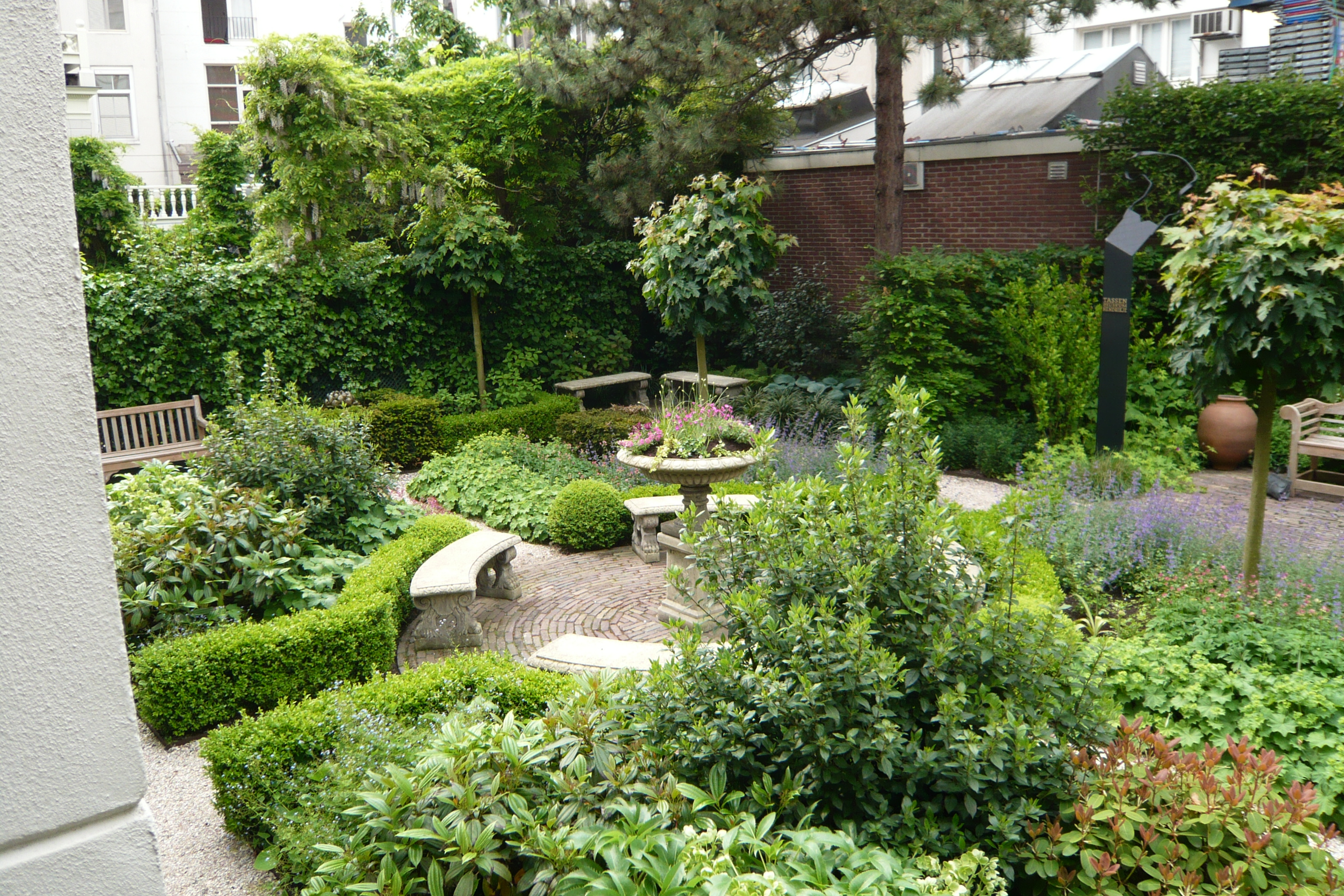
Museum of Bags and Purses, garden.

One of only three museums across the globe specialising in this field, it housed the world's largest collection of bags and purses.

The Museum of Bags and Purses was the first cultural institution in the Netherlands to announce its permanent closure in April 2020 as a result of the coronavirus pandemic.

== History ==
Hendrikje Ivo, an antique dealer from Amstelveen, bought her first bag in the mid-1960s. A small tortoiseshell bag inlaid with mother of pearl dating from the 1820s, it was the beginning of a lifelong passion. Together with her husband Heinz, Hendrikje collected more than 3,000 bags before deciding to open part of the collection to the public. The first Museum of Bags and Purses consisted of two rooms in the Ivos' own house in Amstelveen, where it remained for ten years. It was very much a family business, with their daughter, Sigrid, an art historian, developing the museum's informative content. (Sigrid Ivo later became the director of the Museum of Bags and Purses). However, as the collection continued to grow, it became apparent that new premises were required. A donor came forward, and offered the museum its present location on the Herengracht.

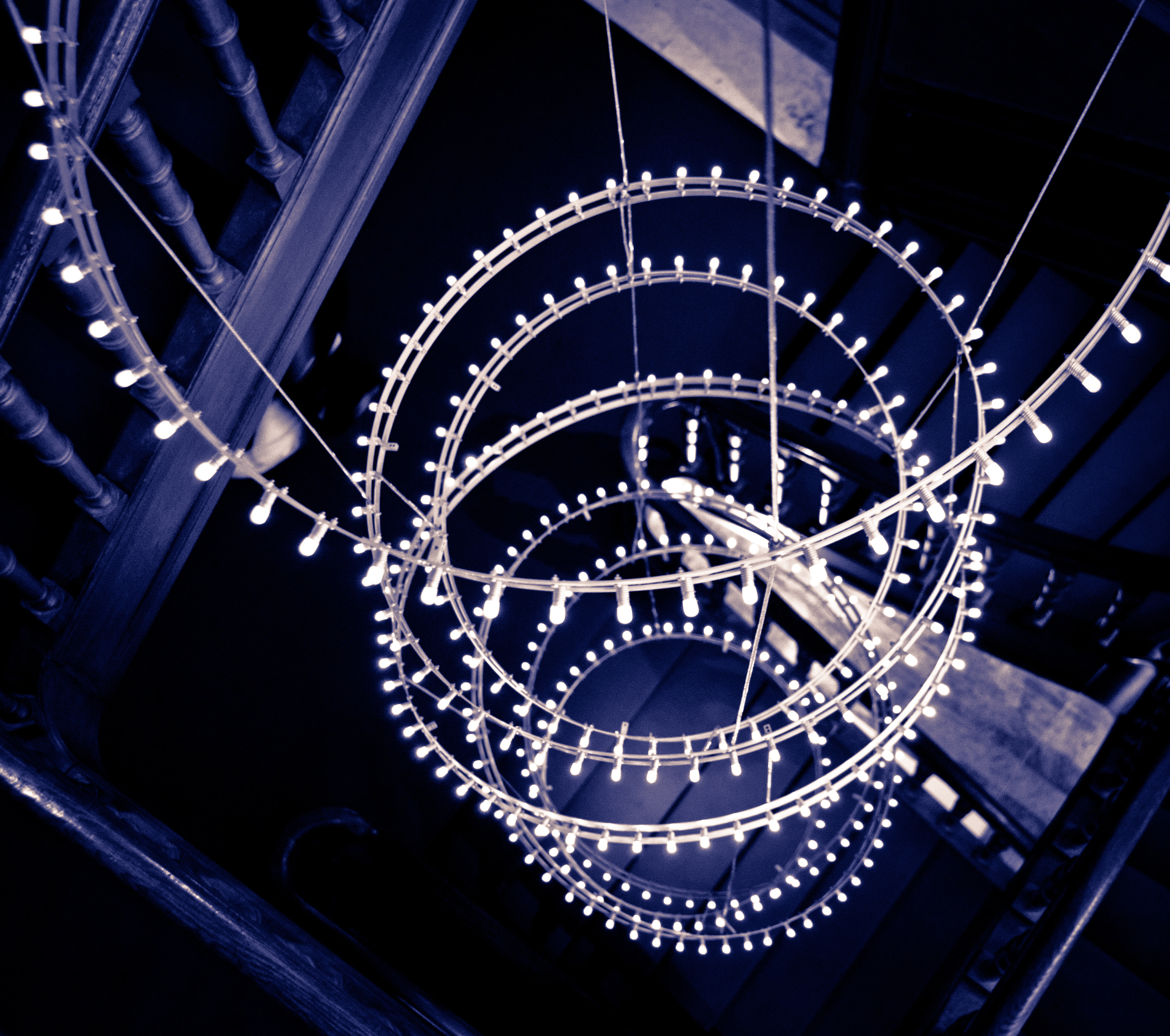
Museum of Bags and Purses, staircase.

The museum recently began a large-scale renovation project of its permanent collection. The third floor of the museum, which houses the museum's collection of objects dating from the sixteenth- to the nineteenth-century, was reopened on the 24th of April 2018. The intention was to begin the renovation of the twentieth-century collection in November 2019.

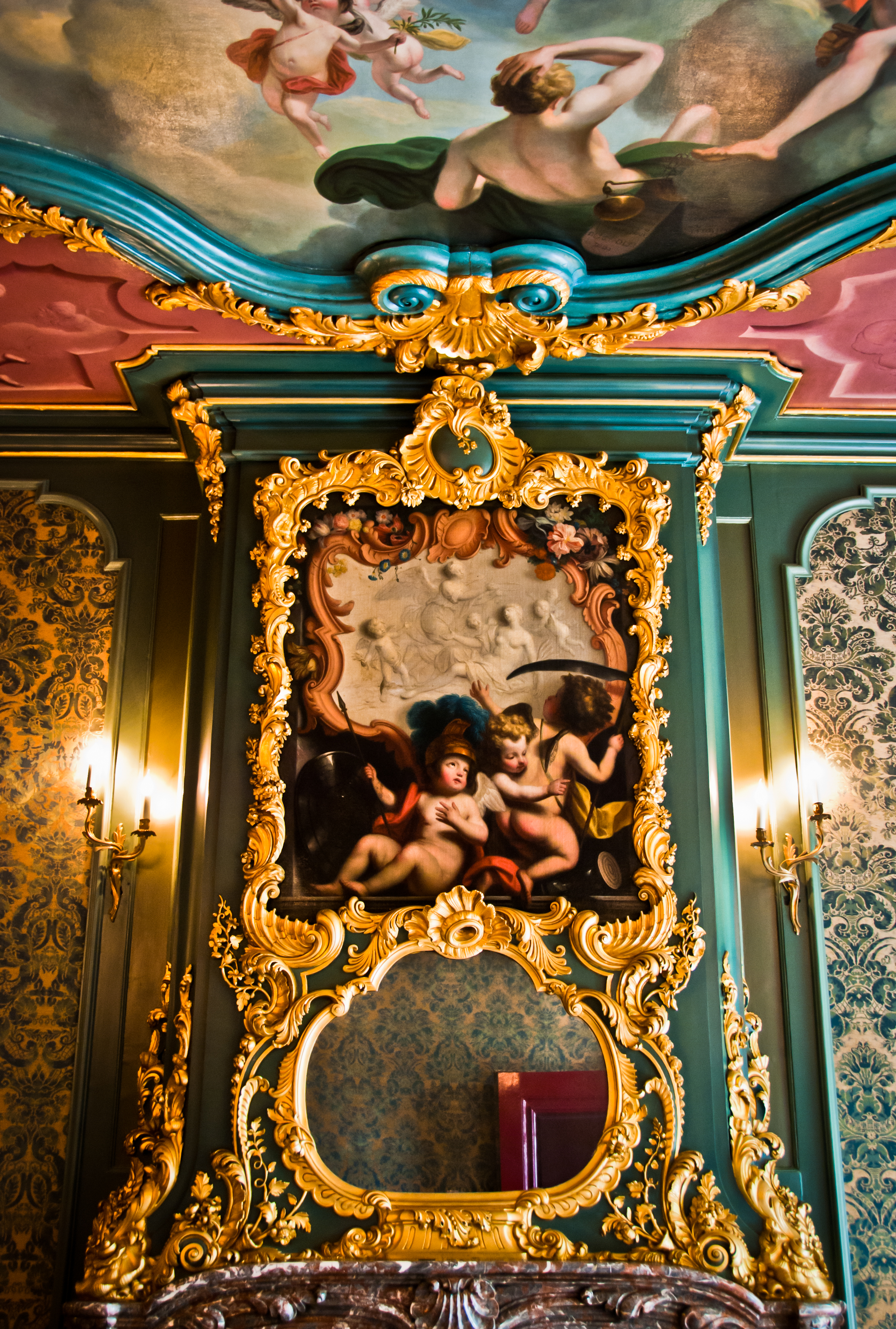
Museum of Bags and Purses, original period room.

The highlights of the museum's collection were on permanent display on the second and third floors, whilst the lower levels were used for temporary exhibitions. Recent exhibitions have included "Accessories Are a Girl's Best Friend", which was made in collaboration with the Rijksmuseum, and "Made In Italy, which was the museum's first use of clothing in an exhibition. By the time it closed, the collection contained over 5,000 bags.

In March of 2019, the museum announced it had hired Manon Schaap as director, following the retirement of Sigrid Ivo a year earlier.

Upon the announcement, Schaap said in a press release: "The Museum of Bags and Purses has an incredible amount of potential. Together with an enthusiastic team...I am working on a challenging program with new stories, sparkling presentations and room for experimentation." Schaap presented three exhibitions during her tenure: "Bags in Bloom", "Talent Invasion" and "It's a Family Affair".

The museum closed its doors in line with the Dutch lockdown restrictions responding to the coronavirus pandemic in March 2020. In April, director Manon Schaap announced this closure would be permanent, as the museum was facing insurmountable financial pressure.

In a press statement published on the museum's website, Schaap wrote: "Unfortunately, insufficient financial resources in the form of subsidies and sponsorship have been found for our long-term future. Due in part to the current societal crisis, there is insufficient perspective for the future. It makes me very sad that I have to close the doors. We were working on bringing the vision of the bag, identity, fashion, craft and society to life. Unfortunately, reality has caught up with us."

== Herengracht 573 ==
Since June 2007, the Museum of Bags and Purses was located in a traditional 17th-century canal house. On the Herengracht, it formed part of the 'Grachtengordel', the ring of canals at the centre of Amsterdam that was made a UNESCO World Heritage Site in 2010.

The house was built by Cornelis de Graeff, one of the most powerful statesmen during the Dutch Golden Age, uncle of Grand Pensionary Johan de Witt and owner of a huge art collection, who was appointed burgomaster of Amsterdam ten times. His second marriage was to Catharina Hooft, an influential woman in her own right who was painted by Frans Hals as a child. At an auction in 1664, De Graeff bought two building plots on the Herengracht. A unique agreement was signed between De Graeff and the other purchasers in which they promised to build their new houses ‘to a single height, a single faciat and a single gable’. This led to the creation of a uniform row of houses. It is the only example of this throughout the entire canal belt, which is famous for its eclectic mix of gabeled housing. Cornelis de Graeff passed away shortly afterwards, leaving his older son Pieter de Graeff to continue the building project. The first stone of Herengracht 573 was laid on the 17th of April 1664. Pieter de Graeff was every bit as illustrious as his parents. He also served as an Amsterdam city councillor, as well as being the brother-in-law and advisor of the famous statesman Johan de Witt, and together with his wife moved in the highest circles of the Dutch Republic.

The two surviving period rooms were decorated during Pieter de Graeff's time. The five ceiling paintings in the smaller period room were painted by Paulus de Fouchier around 1682. The central panel depicts a woman representing the city of Amsterdam, surrounded by allegorical representations of Europe, Asia, Africa and the Americas. Oceania is not represented due to it still being unknown to the West at the time of painting.

The next inhabitant where Pieter's older son Johan de Graeff and later Gerrit de Graeff (I.) van Zuid-Polsbroek, Gerrit de Graeff (II) van Zuid-Polsbroek, Gerrit de Graeff (III.) van Zuid-Polsbroek and Gerrit de Graeff (IV) van Zuid-Polsbroek all influential city councillors. By that time, the De Graeff family had accumulated a substantial fortune, through inheritance and trading with the Dutch East Indies. Gerrit lived in the canal house until 1752. In the first decades of the eighteenth-century, his successors had the building thoroughly renovated and modernised. These renovations can still be seen today, particularly in the larger period room, where both the ceiling paintings and fireplace mantel date from this time. The small period room also contains a sumptuously decorated eighteenth-century chimney-piece.

During the nineteenth-century, the mansion was inhabited by Jeltje de Bosch Kemper. An early feminist and member of the women's suffrage movement in the Netherlands, she was one of the first women to speak out about the limited lifestyle upper-class women at the time were expected to lead. She also championed women's right to employment, and was a vocal member of the Algemeene Nederlandsche Vrouwenvereeniging Arbeid Adelt ("Universal Dutch Women's Labour Association"). Together with like-minded people she founded the "Amsterdamsche Huishoudschool", a school to train women in housework, intended for both housewives and those who wished to become professional housekeepers.

The last inhabitant of the Herengracht 573 was Maria van Eik. She bought the mansion in 1893 for 44,000 Dutch guilders (approximately 20,000 euro) and lived there until her death in 1906. A year later, the building was sold to the Hollandsche Brand Assurantie Sociëteit and was occupied by a number of different businesses throughout the twentieth-century. In 2007, thanks to the support of an anonymous donor, Herengracht 573 was purchased by the Museum of Bags and Purses. The museum retained many of its original period features, notably in its two period rooms on the first floor. These rooms were restored to their former glory, and could be booked for weddings and other events. During museum opening hours, the rooms were open to the public as part of the museum cafe, where visitors could enjoy 'Period Room Lunches' and high teas.

== Collection ==
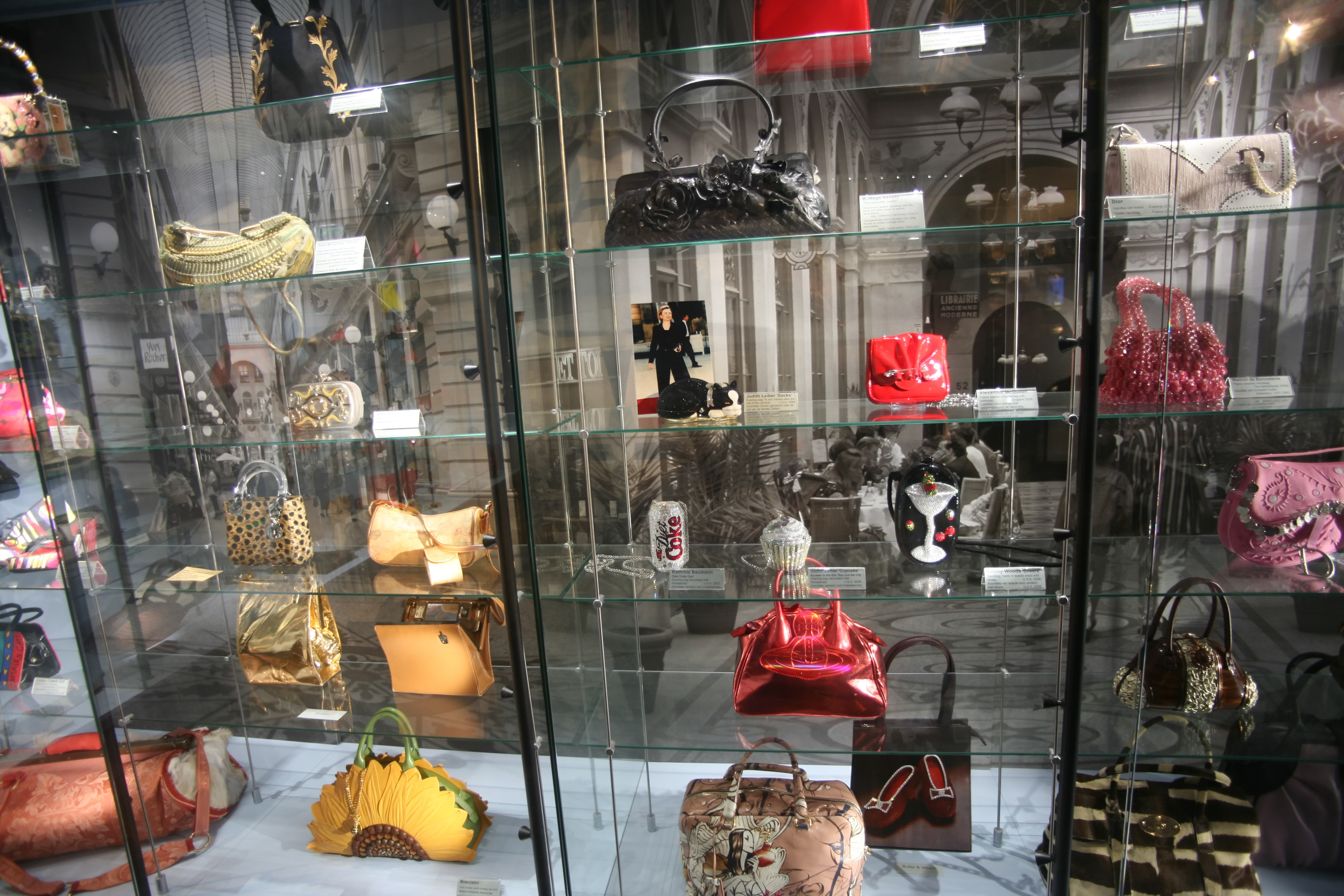
Museum of Bags and Purses, collection.

The earliest item in the collection was a sixteenth-century men's goatskin pouch. With metal belt loops and eighteen concealed pockets, it was most likely used by travelling merchants. Many of the earliest bags in the collection are characterised by their heavy metal frames. Frames often outlasted the fabric bags, leading to many early purse frames being reused in later bags, something the museum showcases. The number of bags owned by men notably declines after the introduction of pockets to menswear in the sixteenth century. Bags owned by men become increasingly specialised, with the museum displaying examples such as tobacco pouches and doctors bags.

The museum also displayed a number of pouches from the seventeenth- and eighteenth-century intended for use by both men and women at the gambling table. These pouches can be distinguished by their wide mouths and stiffened bases, which ensured that the bags could stand upright, displaying any winnings prominently within. There are also several examples embroidered with coats of arms, intended as a further statement of prestige. There are also examples of sablé beaded wedding pouches. Of a similar shape to gaming bags, they were often given as gifts, sometimes as part of a dowry. These would have contained money, but in many cases the bags themselves would have been just as valuable. The museum's collection included one example embroidered with over 50,000 tiny sablé beads. 'Sablè' is the French for 'sand': the beads are so small, they had to be threaded on a strand of horsehair instead of a needle. This kind of bag would have taken even an experienced craftsman over two weeks to make.

Within the home environment, women of every class were expected to be able to sew, and the museum has many examples of work bags and sewing accessories dating from the eighteenth- to the twentieth-century. Women wore separate pockets tied at the waist up until the early nineteenth century, and several examples of these 'thigh pockets' were on display in the museum's permanent collection, including an impressive flame-stitched example dating to 1766. However, the shift of the waistline to just below the bust (the Empire waistline), as well as the growing fashion for sheer fabrics such as cotton and muslin, meant that the tied pockets no longer fit under fashionable clothing. This led to the invention of the reticule (often referred to in early fashion texts as a 'ridicule', from the French), of which the museum has many examples. Reticules are usually small, as upper-class women were not expected to carry very much: sometimes not much more than a handkerchief and a bottle of smelling salts. In an era of footmen and maidservants, aristocratic women could rely on others to carry their jackets and outdoor shoes, and often 'bought' things on credit, meaning they rarely carried money. The earliest reticules bear a close relation in shape to the tied pocket, but as can be seen in the museum's nineteenth-century display, styles and fashions changed rapidly throughout the period. Reticules continued to be used up until the 1930s, and the museum had an extensive collection of beaded evening bags from the 1920s that share many similarities with bags from a century before.

With the coming of the Industrial Revolution, technology and the growth of the railways made travel accessible to the burgeoning middle class. This in turn led to a whole new trade in travelling accessories, from larger bags-often made of durable leather- to the famous trunks of makers such as Louis Vuitton, who first made his name supplying to the Empress Eugenie de Montijo. The museum had a large collection of suitcases, including early examples of Louis Vuitton travelling cases, as well as steamer trunks, portable wardrobes (complete with drawers and coat hangers), and vanity cases. There are also examples of bags intended for shorter trips, notably picnic baskets, including one example from England that comes complete with tea set and stove.

The word 'handbag' came into use in the twentieth-century. With an increasing number of women going out to work, women needed to carry more on a day-to-day basis. As could be seen in the museum's twentieth-century displays, handbags have been offered in a number of shapes and sizes, from solid transparent Perspex bags and novelty-shaped baskets to a handbag that incorporates a fully functioning telephone. There was a display on the materials that designers have used over the years, including the skin of stingrays, leopards, and armadillos. The museum received many donations from collectors who, for ethical reasons, no longer wish to keep animal-based handbags themselves. Brand name bags came to the fore in the 1950s, and the museum held many examples, including several quilted Chanel purses, early examples of Gucci's bamboo-handled handbag, and the Hermès Kelly Bag. There were also bags on display with a larger history: the museum displays a handbag owned by Margaret Thatcher, as well as a Judith Leiber minaudière identical to the one Hillary Clinton brought to the 1993 Inauguration Ball shaped like the Clinton cat, Socks.

The Museum of Bags and Purses continued the Ivos' legacy of collecting. Some of their last acquisitions included the 2016 Balenciaga Bazar Shopper bag, which had been called the 'It Bag' of 2016.

== See also ==
- Simone Handbag Museum in Seoul, South Korea
- ESSE Purse Museum in Little Rock, Arkansas
- Handbag collecting
