= Gerrit de Graeff (IV) van Zuid-Polsbroek =

Dutch patrician and aristocrat (1797–1870)

Gerrit de Graeff (IV), vrijheer van Zuid-Polsbroek, Purmerland and Ilpendam (26 July 1797, Ilpendam – 27 March 1870) was a Dutch patrician, Amsterdam aristocrat and feudal Lord.

== Life ==
Gerrit de Graeff was a scion of the De Graeff family and a son of Gerrit de Graeff (III.) van Zuid-Polsbroek and Emilia Henriette Stadlander. At the age of 17 years he inherited the Free Lordships (Vrijheerlijkheiden) of Zuid-Polsbroek and Purmerland and Ilpendam from his father. His profession was a manufacturer and he became captain of the Amsterdam Schutterij (Civic Guard), President College Hoofdingelanden of the Purmer and a member of the Amsterdam Municipal Council between 1839 and 1848. In 1833 he acted as a deacon of the Reformed Church in Amsterdam.

De Graeff had seven children through his 1827 marriage with Carolina Ursulina Stephania Engels (1795-1864):

- Emilia Henrietta Maria de Graeff (1828-1839), died young
- Gerrit Arnold Theodoor de Graeff (1831–1889), founded a family branch in South-Africa
- Carolina Frederica Christina de Graeff (1832–1885), married Gustaaf Adolf Croockewit
- Dirk de Graeff van Polsbroek (1833–1916), diplomat who laid the foundation stone for modern Dutch and European diplomacy in Japan
- Christina Jacoba de Graeff (1836-1842), died young
- Frederik Lodewijk de Graeff (1837-1918), major hussar, lieutenant-colonel
- Gijsbert Carel Rutger Reinier de Graeff (1838-1923), major Infanterie in Dutch East Indies, lieutenant-colonel, knight Military Order of William

The family of Gerrit de Graeff lived at Herengracht in a mansion, now the Tassenmuseum Hendrikje, at castle Ilpenstein and at the country estate Bronstee near Heemstede. At Ilpenstein, De Graeff owned a big art collection, including paintings from Rembrandt van Rijn, Gerard Ter Borch and Jacob van Ruisdael. The collection included some famous paintings like Catharina Hooft with her Nurse, painted by Frans Hals, and the Pickenoys representative Marriage portraits from Cornelis de Graeff and Catharina Hooft. Both now can be seen at the Gemäldegalerie, Berlin. After De Graeff's death, the two high Lordships were sold to Dirk de Jongh.

=== Coat of arms ===
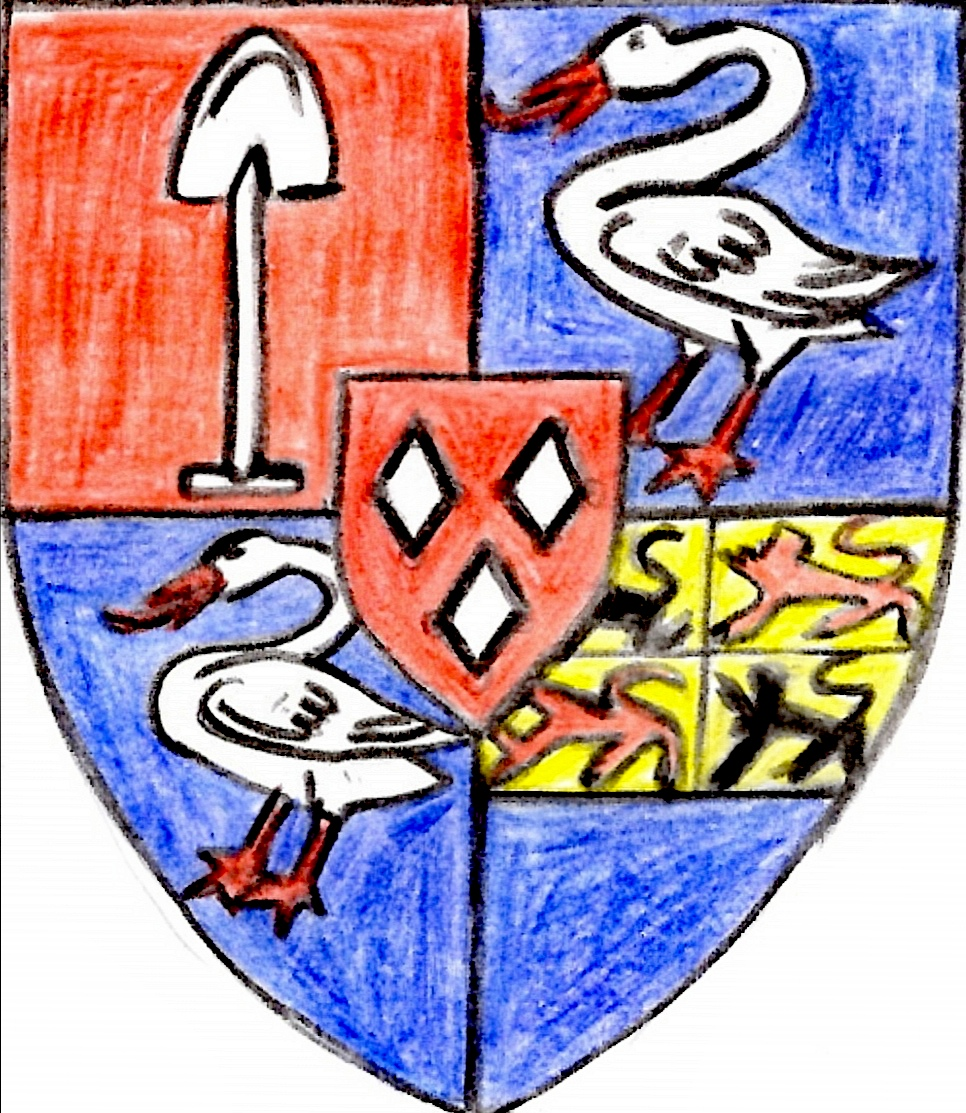
Full coat of arms De Graeff (drawing by Matthias Laurenz Gräff, 2023)

The coat of arms of Gerrit de Graeff is quartered with a heart shield and it shows the following symbols:

- heart shield shows the three silver rhombuses on red (originally from the family Van Woerdern van Vliet) of the High Lordship Zuid-Polsbroek
- field 1 (left above) shows the silver shovel on red of their paternal ancestors, the Herren von Graben
- field 2 (right above) shows the silver swan on blue of the Fief Vredenhof or that one (Waterland) of one of their maternal ancestors, the De Grebber
- field 3 (left below) shows the silver goose in blue of Purmerland (High Lordship Purmerland and Ilpendam)
- field 4 (right below) shows the red and black lions on gold (the arms of the County of Holland) for Ilpendam (High Lordship Purmerland and Ilpendam) above a blue area
- shield holders are two silver swans
- helmet covers in red and silver
- helm adornment shows an upright silver spade with ostrich feathers (Herren von Graben)
- motto: MORS SCEPTRA LIGONIBUS AEQUAT (DEATH MAKES SEPTRES AND HOES EQUAL)

=== Titles ===
Gerrit de Graeff (IV) van Zuid-Polsbroek House De Graeff Born: 24 February 1766 Died: 16 December 1814
Regnal titles
Preceded by Gerrit de Graeff (III.) van Zuid-Polsbroek	Free Lord of the High Fief Zuid-Polsbroek; 1814–1870	Succeeded by Dirk de Jongh
Preceded by Gerrit de Graeff (III.) van Zuid-Polsbroek	26.th Lord of the Free Fief Purmerland and Ilpendam; 1814–1870	Succeeded by Dirk de Jongh

== Literature ==
- Graeff, P. de (P. de Graeff Gerritsz en Dirk de Graeff van Polsbroek) Genealogie van de familie De Graeff van Polsbroek, Amsterdam 1882.
- Bruijn, J. H. de Genealogie van het geslacht De Graeff van Polsbroek 1529/1827, met bijlagen. De Built 1962–63.
- Moelker, H.P. De heerlijkheid Purmerland en Ilpendam (1978 Purmerend)
