= Gerrit de Graeff (III.) van Zuid-Polsbroek =

Dutch noble (1766–1814)

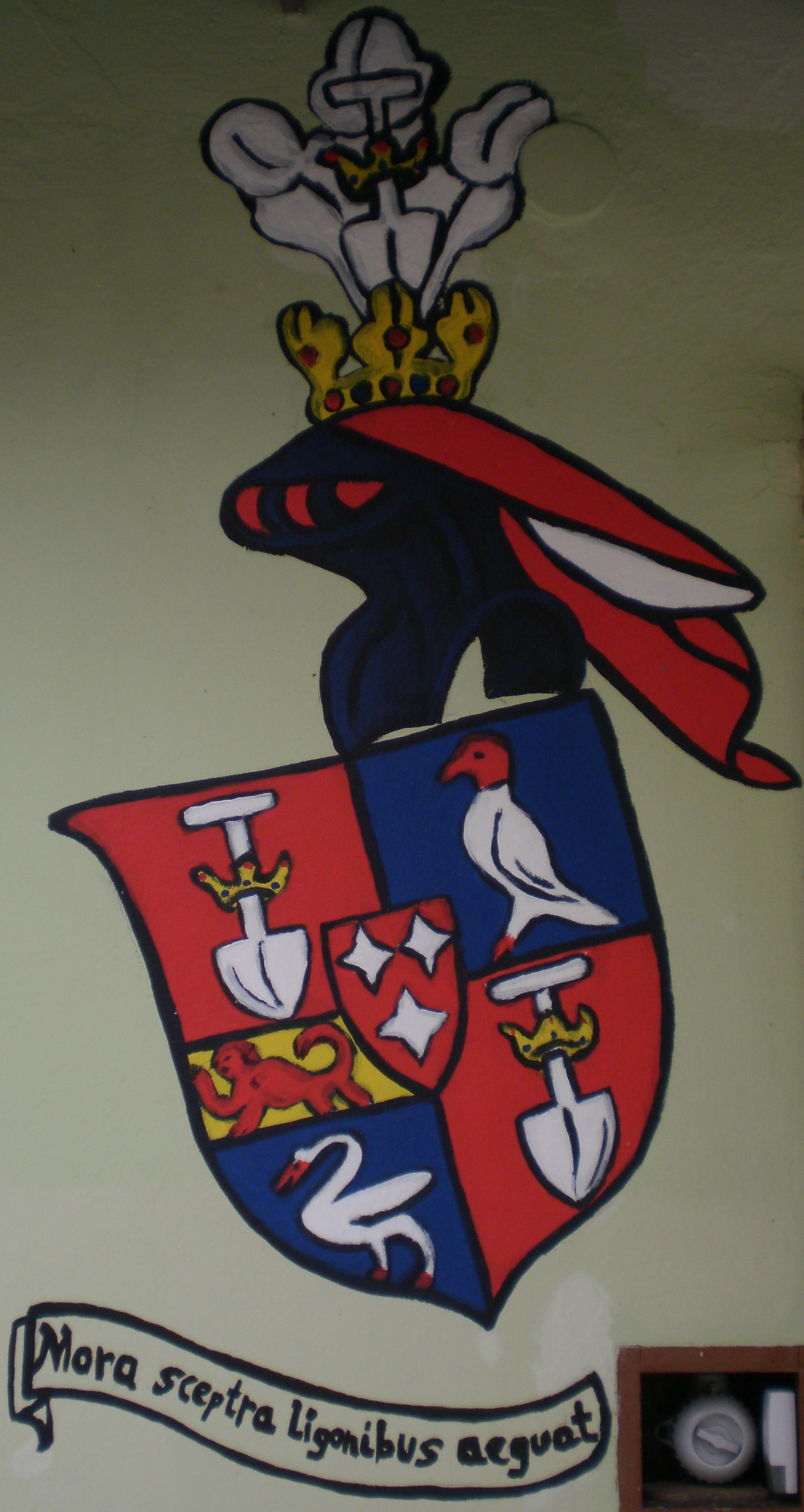

full coat of arms De Graeff (painted by Matthias Laurenz Gräff, 2011)

Personal details
- Born: 24 February 1766 Amsterdam
- Died: 16 December 1814 (aged 48) Amsterdam
- Party: States Faction
- Spouse: Emilia Henriette Stadlander
- Children: Christina Elisabeth, Gerrit, Anna Margaretha, Cornelia Maria
- Occupation: Landlord

Gerrit de Graeff, vrijheer van Zuid-Polsbroek, Purmerland and Ilpendam (24 February 1766, Amsterdam – 16 December 1814) was a member of the influential De Graeff family of Amsterdam. He belonged to the patrician class of the city and held the feudal titles Free Lord of Zuid-Polsbroek as those of Purmerland and Ilpendam.

== Biography ==
Gerrit de Graeff was a son of Gerrit de Graeff (II) van Zuid-Polsbroek, patrician of Amsterdam and Christina van Herzeele. In 1794 he married Emilia Henriette Stadlander (1766–1826). The couple had four children:

- Christina Elisabeth de Graeff (born 1795), married Jacob Gerrit van Garderen (1803–1856) and lived as the last residents at Ilpenstein castle. Van Garderen was mayor of Ilpendam, member of the Provincial Council of North Holland for Broek in Waterland and Heemraad of Waterland
- Gerrit de Graeff (IV) van Zuid-Polsbroek (1797–1870), married Carolina Ursulina Stephania Engels (1795–1864)
- Anna Margaretha de Graeff (1798–1824), died five days after marrying Jonkheer Dirk Alewijn
- Cornelia Maria de Graeff (1800–1876), remained unmarried

The family of Gerrit de Graeff lived at Herengracht in a mansion, now the Tassenmuseum Hendrikje. Most of the time he resided at his castle Ilpenstein, and he also owned the country estate Bronstee near Heemstede. At Ilpenstein, De Graeff owned a big art collection, including paintings from Rembrandt van Rijn, Gerard Ter Borch and Jacob van Ruisdael. The collection included some famous paintings like Catharina Hooft with her Nurse, painted by Frans Hals, and the Pickenoys representative Marriage portraits from Cornelis de Graeff and Catharina Hooft. Both now can be seen at the Gemäldegalerie, Berlin.

In 1811 De Graeff inherited the Vrijheerlijkheiden Zuid-Polsbroek, Purmerland and Ilpendam from his father. He was also President-Hoofdingeland of the Purmer (Water Board). He died only three years after his father. His only son Gerrit succeeded him as Free Lord of Zuid-Polsbroek, Purmerland and Ilpendam in 1814.

=== Titles ===
Gerrit de Graeff (III.) van Zuid-Polsbroek House De Graeff Born: 24 February 1766 Died: 16 December 1814
Regnal titles
Preceded by Gerrit de Graeff II.	Free Lord of the High Fief Zuid-Polsbroek; 1811–1814	Succeeded by Gerrit de Graeff (IV) van Zuid-Polsbroek
Preceded by Gerrit de Graeff II.	25.th Lord of the Free Fief Purmerland and Ilpendam; 1811–1814	Succeeded by Gerrit de Graeff (IV) van Zuid-Polsbroek

== Literature ==
- Graeff, P. de (P. de Graeff Gerritsz en Dirk de Graeff van Polsbroek) Genealogie van de familie De Graeff van Polsbroek, Amsterdam 1882.
- Bruijn, J. H. de Genealogie van het geslacht De Graeff van Polsbroek 1529/1827, met bijlagen. De Bilt 1962–63.
- Moelker, H.P. De heerlijkheid Purmerland en Ilpendam (1978 Purmerend)
