= Joan de Graeff =

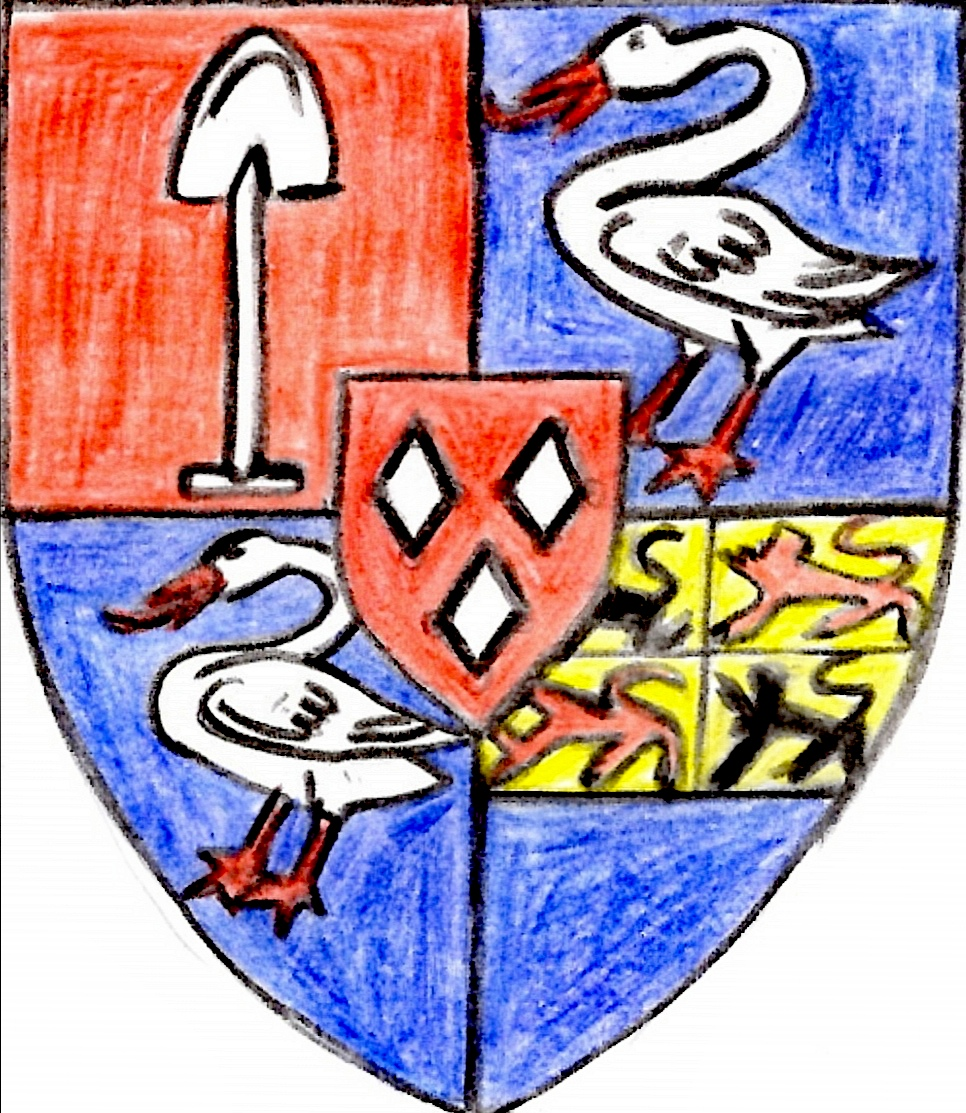
Full coat of arms De Graeff (drawing by Matthias Laurenz Gräff, 2023)

Joan de Graeff (March 11, 1735 in Amsterdam - March 31, 1754 in Geneva) was a Dutch patrician and held the feudal title Free Lord of Zuid-Polsbroek until his sudden death at the age of 19.

== Biography ==
Joan was a scion of the De Graeff family and the only child of Gerrit de Graeff and his first wife Maria Elisabeth Sautijn (1709–1736), daughter from Jan Sautijn, burgomaster of Amsterdam and Constantia Catharina Munter. Through the Sautijns he was a cousin to the families Lampsins and Clifford. After his father's early death at late 1752, he became his successor as Vrijheer of Zuid-Polsbroek. Joan died unmarried while traveling at Geneva, where he is also buried. After his sudden death his younger half-brother Gerrit de Graeff (II) van Zuid-Polsbroek from his father second marriage with Elizabeth Lestevenon (1716–1766) succeeded him in Polsbroek.

== Coat of arms ==
The personal coat of arms of Joan de Graeff is quarterd with a heart shield and shows the following symbols:

- heart shield shows the three silver rhombuses on red (originally from the family Van Woerdern van Vliet) of the High Lordship Zuid-Polsbroek
- field 1 (left above) shows the silver shovel on red of their paternal ancestors, the Herren von Graben
- field 2 (right above) shows the silver swan on blue of the Fief Vredenhof [or that one (Waterland) of their maternal ancestors, the De Grebber family
- field 3 (left below), same as field 2
- field 4 (right below), same as field 1
- helmet covers in red and silver
- helm adornment shows an upright silver spade with ostrich feathers (Herren von Graben)
- motto: MORS SCEPTRA LIGONIBUS AEQUAT (DEATH MAKES SEPTRES AND HOES EQUAL)

Joan de Graeff House De Graeff Born: 11 March 1735 Died: 31 March 1754
Regnal titles
Preceded by Gerrit de Graeff (I.) van Zuid-Polsbroek	Lord of the free and high Lordship Zuid-Polsbroek; 1752–1754	Succeeded by Gerrit de Graeff (II) van Zuid-Polsbroek
