= Free and high fief of Zuid-Polsbroek =

Free or high Lordship of Zuid-Polsbroek Hoge of vrije heerlijkheid Zuid-Polsbroek(nl)
- late 10th century–1923
- Coat of arms
- Status: Vassal of Dutch Republic
- Capital: Polsbroek (Zuid-Polsbroek)
- Government: Allod
- Lords
- Historical era: Middle Ages
  - Lordship founded: early 13th century
  - Allod / Fiefdom of Holland: late 10th century
  - it was not sure if Polsbroek belong to the States of Holland or Utrecht: since the late middleages
  - to Utrecht: 1819
  - Disestablished: 1923

The Free or High Lordship of Zuid-Polsbroek (Dutch: "vrije of hoge heerlijkheid") was a type of local jurisdiction with many rights. It's now part of Polsbroek in the Dutch province of Utrecht.

== History ==
Zuid-Polsbroek, or Polsbroek, was an allodium and a free or high heerlijkheid, a type of local jurisdiction with many rights. Since 1155 the lords of Polsbroek are able to speak the high (blood court) middle and low justice over their territory. Zuid-Polsbroek was a half-independent (semi-sovereign) entity of the provinces Holland or Utrecht, like the larger Barony of IJsselstein to the east. During the late middle ages it became unsure if Zuid-Polsbroek originally belonged to the States of Holland or to the province (unie) of Utrecht. Polsbroek paid their duties to the States of Holland. When the French introduced the municipal system in the Netherlands in 1807, the rights of the heerlijkheid were largely abolished, although the heerlijkheid itself existed until the early 20th century.

The fief of (Zuid-)Polsbroek was first ruled by the Lords of Arkel since the late 10th century. In later years Polsbroek was ruled by the lords of Woerden van Vliet (until 1423), Viscounts of Montfoort (1423-1481/82), Lords of Bergen from the House of Glymes (1481/82 until 1566), the House of Ligne (from 1566 to 1568) and their following House of Arenberg-Ligne (from 1568 to 1610). Since 1610 the heerlijkheid was a possession of the regentenfamily De Graeff from Amsterdam. When the French introduced the municipal system in the Netherlands in 1795, the rights of the heerlijkheid were largely abolished, although the heerlijkheid itself existed until the early 20th century.

=== Capacity ===
Zuid-Polsbroek was not a very big or important one of the Free or High Lordships of Holland or Utrecht. In 1555, Polsbroek had brought Jean de Ligne an annual income of 954 guilders, made up of rental income (63%), taxes (17%) and manorial rights such as hunting and fishing rights (20%). As for the extent of the property, he was recorded in the books in Jacob Dircksz de Graeff's ownership in 1623 with 692 acres of land and 56 houses.

=== Lords of (Zuid-)Polsbroek ===
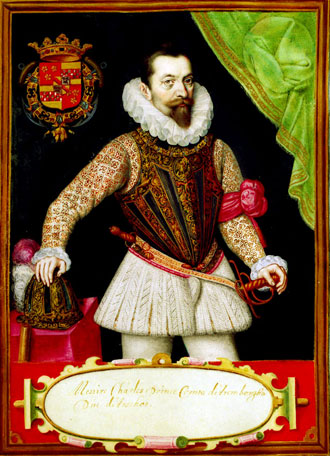
Charles de Ligne, 2nd Prince of Arenberg

- -1008 Foppe van Arkel
- 1008-1034 Johan I van Arkel
- 1034-1077 Johan II van Arkel
- 1077-1115/18 Johan III van Arkel
- 1115/18-1140 Folpert van Arkel van der Leede
- 1140-1200 Herbaren I van der Leede
- 1200-1207 Floris Herbaren van der Leede
- 1207-1212 Folpert II van der Leede
- 1212-1234 Herbaren II van der Leede van Arkel
- 1234-1255 Johan I van der Leede
- 1255-1284 Folpert und Pelgrim van der Leede
- 1284-1296 (?) Johan II van der Leede
- (?) 1296-1299 Wolfert I van Borselen
- -1314 Gerrit van Vliet
- Gerard van Vliet
- -1423 Jan van Woerdern van Vliet
- 1423-1448 Jan II van Montfoort
- 1448-1459 Hendrik IV van Montfoort
- 1459-1481/82 Jan III van Montfoort
- 1482 Michiel van Glymes van Bergen
- 1482-1509 Cornelis van Glymes van Bergen
- 1509-1533 Maximilian van Glymes van Bergen
- 1533-1566 Maria of Bergen
- 1566-1568 Louis de Ligne
- 1568 Jean de Ligne
- 1568-1610 Charles de Ligne
- 1610-1638 Jacob Dircksz de Graeff
- 1638-1664 Cornelis de Graeff
- 1664-1707 Pieter de Graeff
- 1707-1714 Johan de Graeff
- 1714-1752 Gerrit de Graeff I
- 1752-1754 Joan de Graeff
- 1754-1811 Gerrit de Graeff (II) van Zuid-Polsbroek
- 1811-1814 Gerrit de Graeff (III.) van Zuid-Polsbroek
- 1814-1870 Gerrit de Graeff (IV) van Zuid-Polsbroek
- 1870-1912 Dirk de Jongh
