= Johan Engelbert Elias =

Dutch historian (1875–1959)

Johan Engelbert Elias (18 August 1875 – 1 August 1959) was a Dutch historian known mostly for his important work on the history of Amsterdam's regency ("Vroedschap van Amsterdam"). He is considered the father of genealogical research in the Netherlands.

== Biography ==
He was born in a canal house at Keizersgracht to Gerbrand Pieter Elias, wealthy member of the Amsterdam regency family Elias, and Johanna Engelberta ter Meulen. From 1892 to 1905 he worked as volunteer documentalist for the Amsterdam City Archives. During this time he collected data on Amsterdam regency members from the start of the Dutch republic in 1578 until the French occupation in 1795. He was able to collect data on 14,000 people, which he published in 1903 and 1905 as a two-volume work called De vroedschap van Amsterdam 1578-1795. The introduction to the first volume was published separately as Geschiedenis van het Amsterdamsche Regentenpatriciaat in 1923. It shows the various relationships among Amsterdam regent families and their archives. In 1922 he was awarded an honorary title from the University of Amsterdam, and in 1927 he became a member of the Royal Netherlands Academy of Arts and Sciences (KNAW).

== Works ==
- De vroedschap van Amsterdam 1578-1795, 1903-1905
- Schetsen uit de geschiedenis van het zeewezen, 6 volumes, 1916-1930
- Het voorspel van den eersten Engelschen oorlog, 2 volumes, 1920
- Geschiedenis van het Amsterdamsche Regentenpatriciaat, 1923
- De tweede Engelsche oorlog als het keerpunt in onze betrekkingen met Engeland, 1930
- De vlootbouw in Nederland in de eerste helft der 17e eeuw, 1596-1655, 1933
- De geschiedenis van een Amsterdamsche regentenfamilie. Het geslacht Elias, 1937
- Het Geslacht Elias : de geschiedenis van Een Amsterdamsche Regentenfamilie, 1937, 289 pp. OCLC 1006024120 (Delpher.nl)
- Genealogie van het geslacht Elias, Faas Elias en Witsen Elias, Assen, 1942
