= Zuiderwoude =

- Village
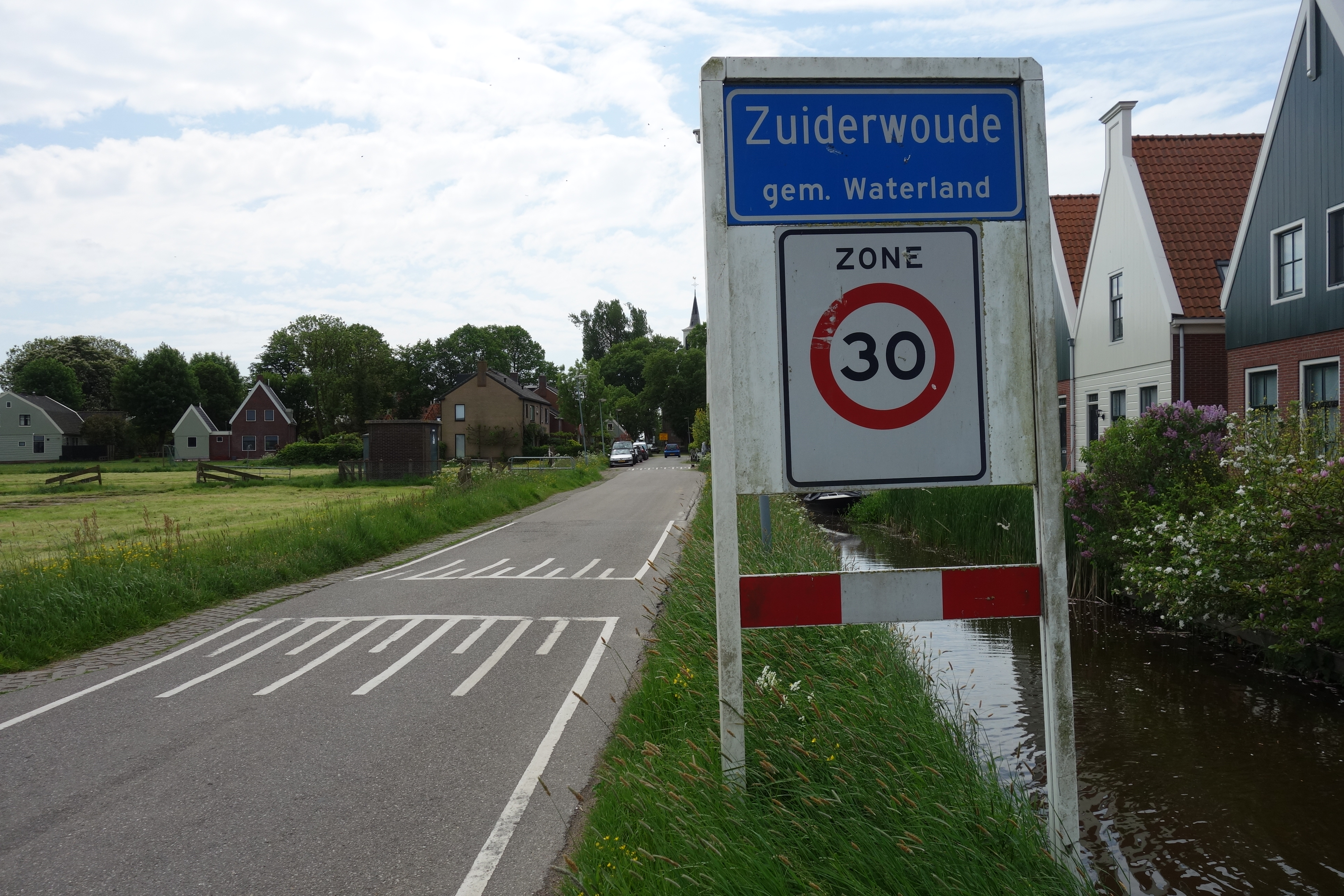
- Zuiderwoude village entrance

- Location in the Netherlands Location in the province of North Holland in the Netherlands
- Coordinates: 52°26′N 5°2′E
- Country: Netherlands
- Province: North Holland
- Municipality: Waterland

Area
  - Total: 6.59 km^{2} (2.54 sq mi)
  - Water: 9.7 km^{2} (3.7 sq mi)

Population (1 January 2021)
  - Total: 320
  - Density: 49/km^{2} (130/sq mi)
- Time zone: UTC+1 (CET)
  - Summer (DST): UTC+2 (CEST)
- Postal code: 1153

Zuiderwoude is a village in the municipality of Waterland, province of North Holland, Netherlands. It lies about 2 km (1.2 mi) south of the municipal administrative centre Monnickendam. In 2021, the statistical area of Zuiderwoude had a population of 320, up from 260 in 2004.

== History ==
The village has been known under various names throughout history: Zuderwout (1340), Zuderwoude (1342), Zuiderwoude (1352), Suyderwoude (1358), Zuyrwoude (1494), Zuider woude (1573), Suyderwoudt (1745). In 1628, Zuiderwoude formed a heerlijkheid with neighbouring Uitdam, until both villages became part of the municipality of Broek in Waterland in 1811.

The current village church (Kerk Zuiderwoude) from 1877 stands where a church has stood since the 11th century. Its address is Dorpstraat 1.
