= Marker Museum =

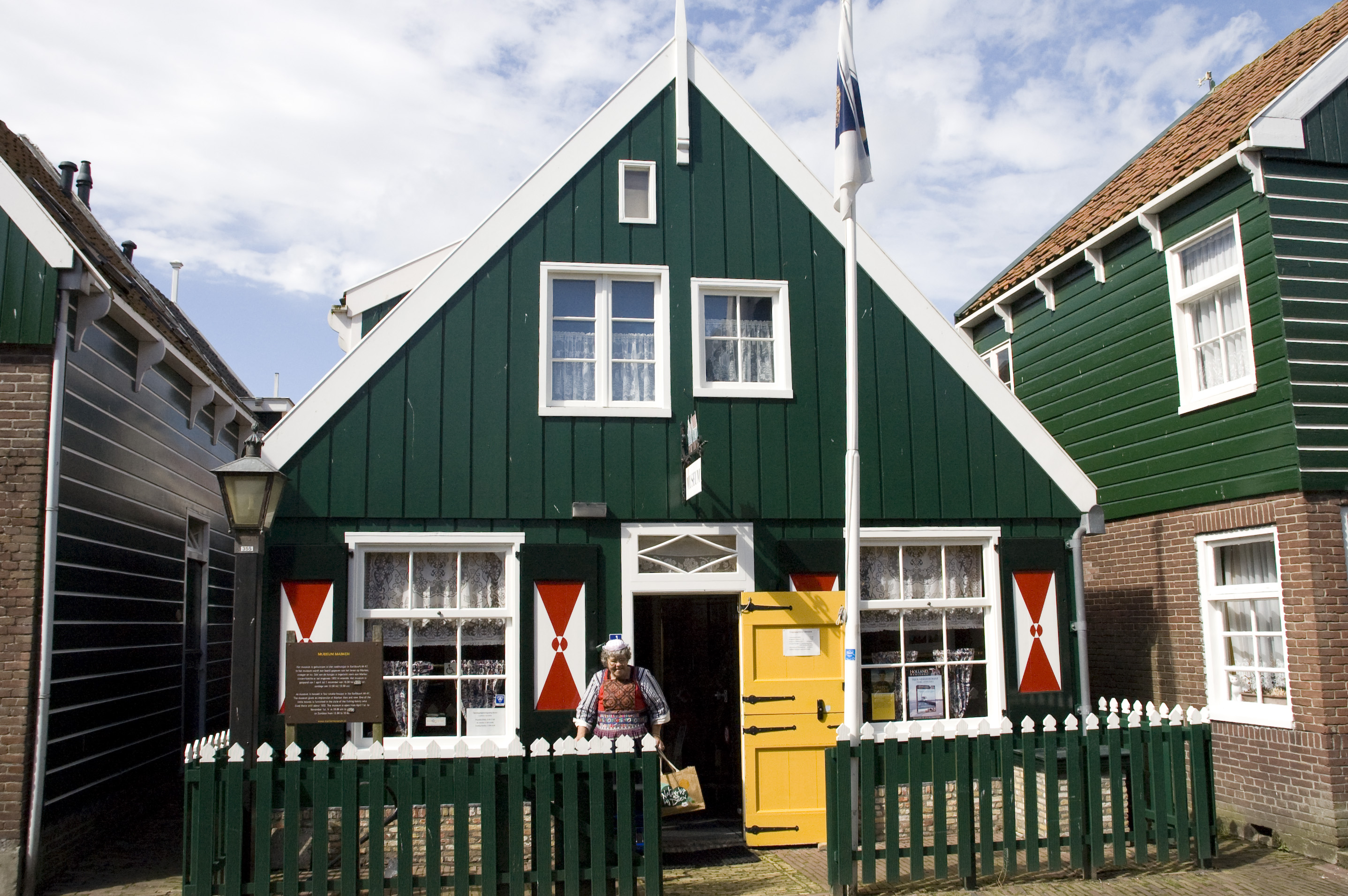
- One of the museum buildings in 2011

- Location in the province of North Holland in the Netherlands
- Established: 1983
- Location: Kerkbuurt 44-47; Marken, Netherlands
- Coordinates: 52.4605°N 5.1062°E
- Type: Local history museum
- Website: www.markermuseum.nl

Marker Museum (Dutch pronunciation: [ˈmɑrkər myˈzeːjʏm]; English: Marken's Museum) is a local museum in the village of Marken in the Netherlands. The museum focuses on the history of Marken, including its fishing heritage.

The museum comprises six houses. The building is a Rijksmonument.
