= Batavus genuinus =

Taxonomic name given to human skull found in Netherlands

Batavus genuinus (Latin for "native" or "authentic Batavian") was the name given in 1828 by the Göttinger professor Johann Friedrich Blumenbach to a human skull from the island of Marken in the Netherlands. Dating from a modern age, the skull's most remarkable single characteristic was its strongly sloping forehead, which Blumenbach thought was an ancient feature that had been preserved by the inhabitants of Marken and other small Zuiderzee islands due to their geographic isolation, which had prevented admixture from other tribes.

In 1877 anthropologist Rudolf Virchow speculated that the low-skulledness exhibited by Frisians in general, but especially by the people of Marken, linked them directly to the ancient prototype of Germanic man. For the same reason, the skulls were classified as Neanderthaloid by craniometrists despite their recent age.

In 1912 Dutch physician Johannes Antonius James Barge demonstrated that the peculiar form of the "Batavus genuinus" skulls, far from being an inherited feature, had been caused by the tight caps that both the male and female children of Marken were made to wear around their heads until the age of seven.
