= Uitdam =

- Village
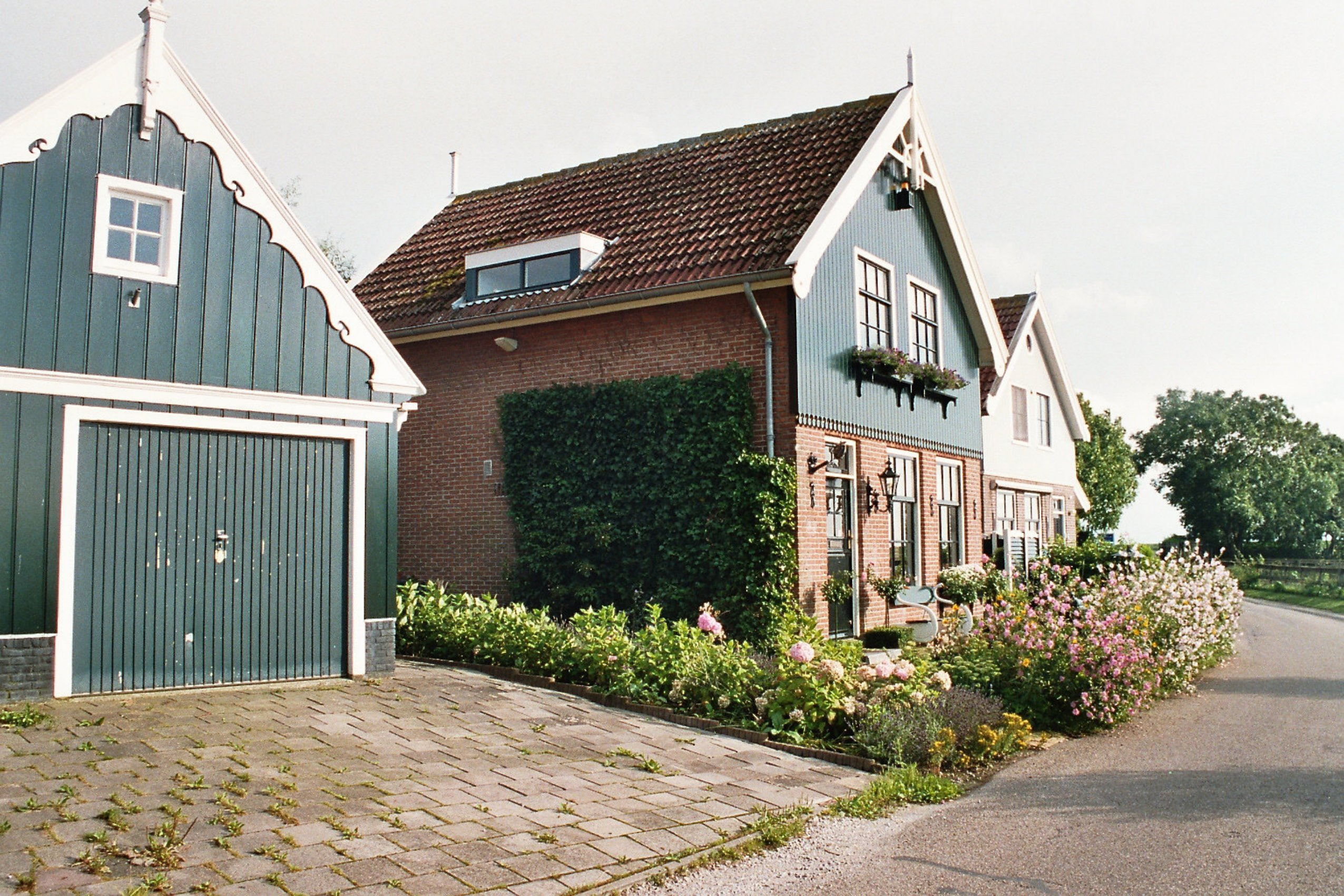
- Houses in Uitdam

- Location in the Netherlands Location in the province of North Holland in the Netherlands
- Coordinates: 52°25′11″N 5°4′12″E
- Country: Netherlands
- Province: North Holland
- Municipality: Waterland

Area
  - Total: 3.69 km^{2} (1.42 sq mi)
- Elevation: −1.0 m (−3.3 ft)

Population (2021)
  - Total: 135
  - Density: 36.6/km^{2} (94.8/sq mi)
- Time zone: UTC+1 (CET)
  - Summer (DST): UTC+2 (CEST)
- Postal code: 1154
- Dialing code: 020

Uitdam is a village in the Dutch province of North Holland. It is a part of the municipality of Waterland, and lies on the coast of the IJsselmeer, about 12 km northeast of Amsterdam.

The village was first mentioned in 1345 as Udam, and means "damn outside the dike". Uitdam and neighbouring Zuiderwoude formed a heerlijkheid in 1628 which existed until 1811. Uitdam was home to 88 people in 1840. The first church was built in the 17th century. The current church dates from 1937.

The village is known for its role in the 17th century where the fishers and craftsman in the village performed parttime as workers for the "Scheepskamelen". These scheepskamelen were used to pull sailing ships into the Amsterdam harbor through shallow waters.

== Gallery ==
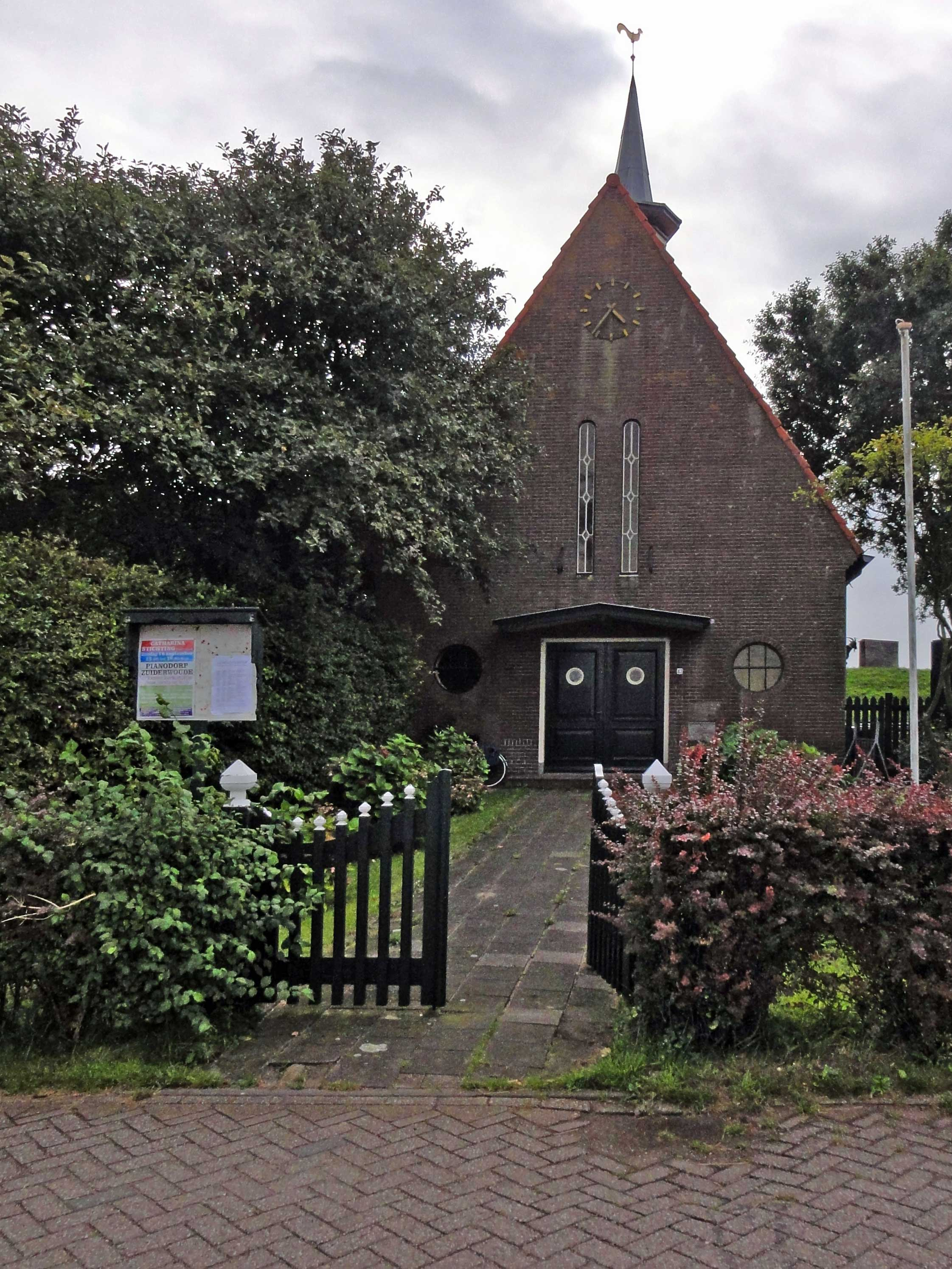
Church in Uitdam

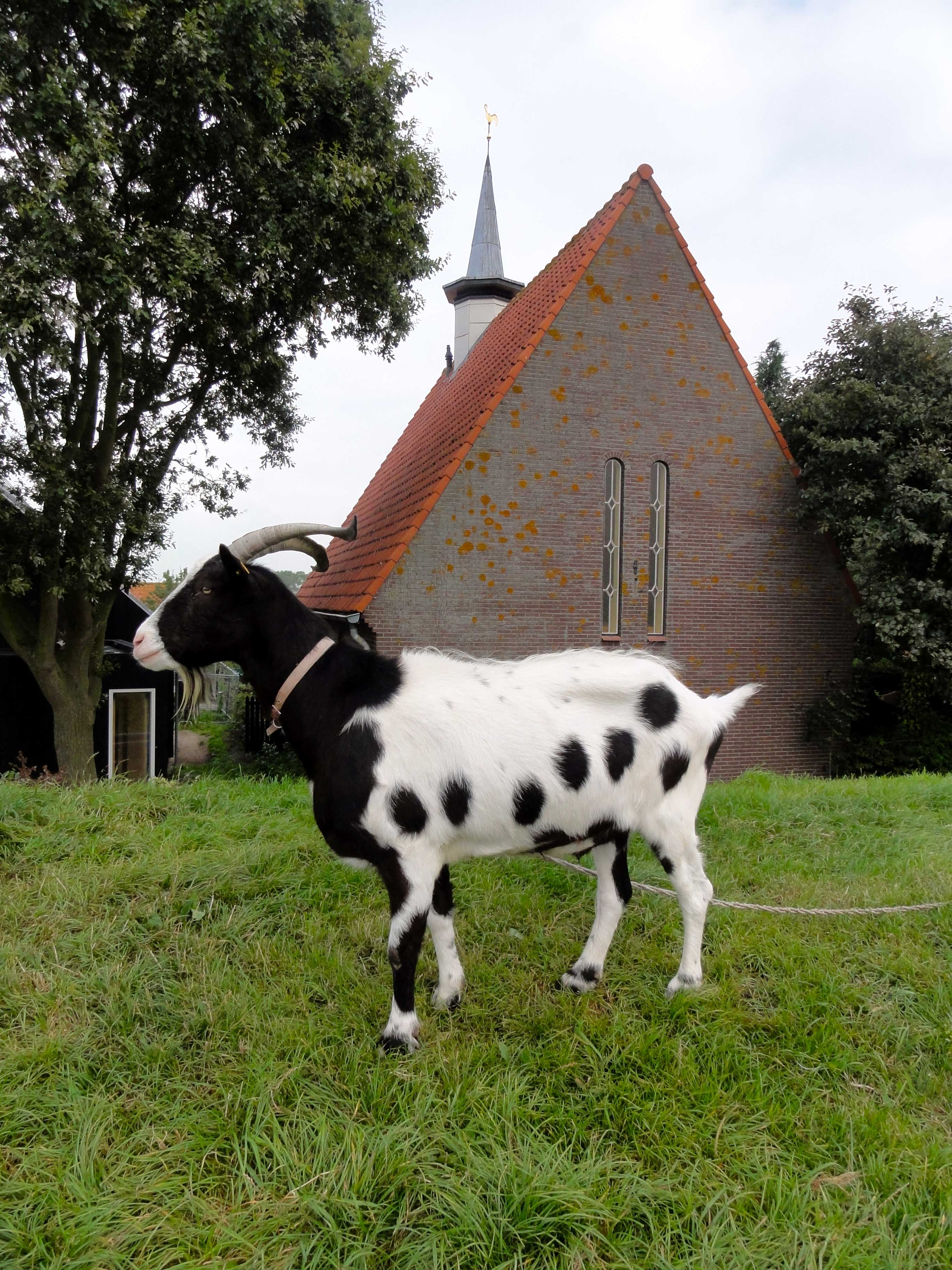
Goat in Uitdam

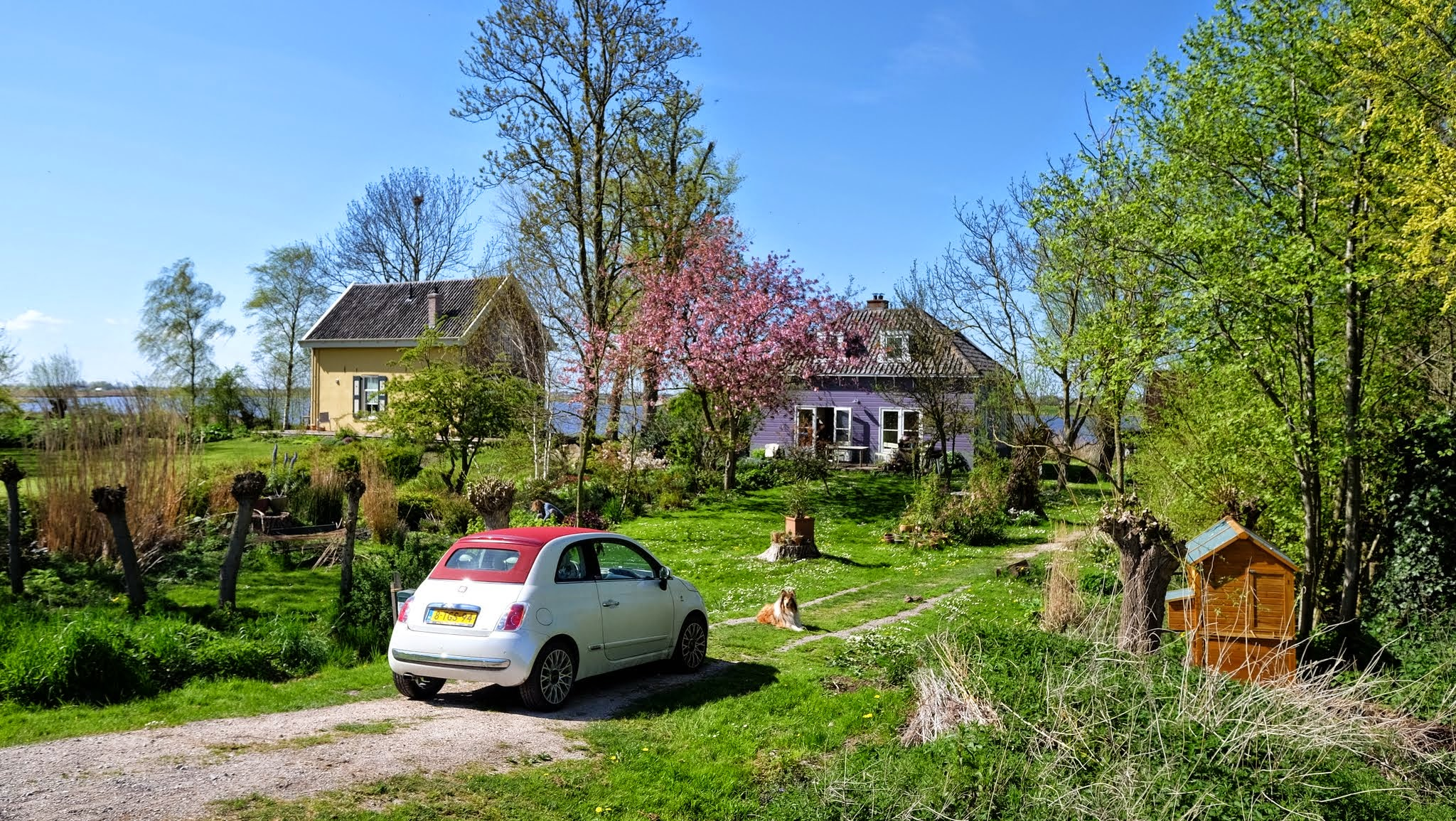
Farm in Uitdam
