= Overleek =

- Hamlet
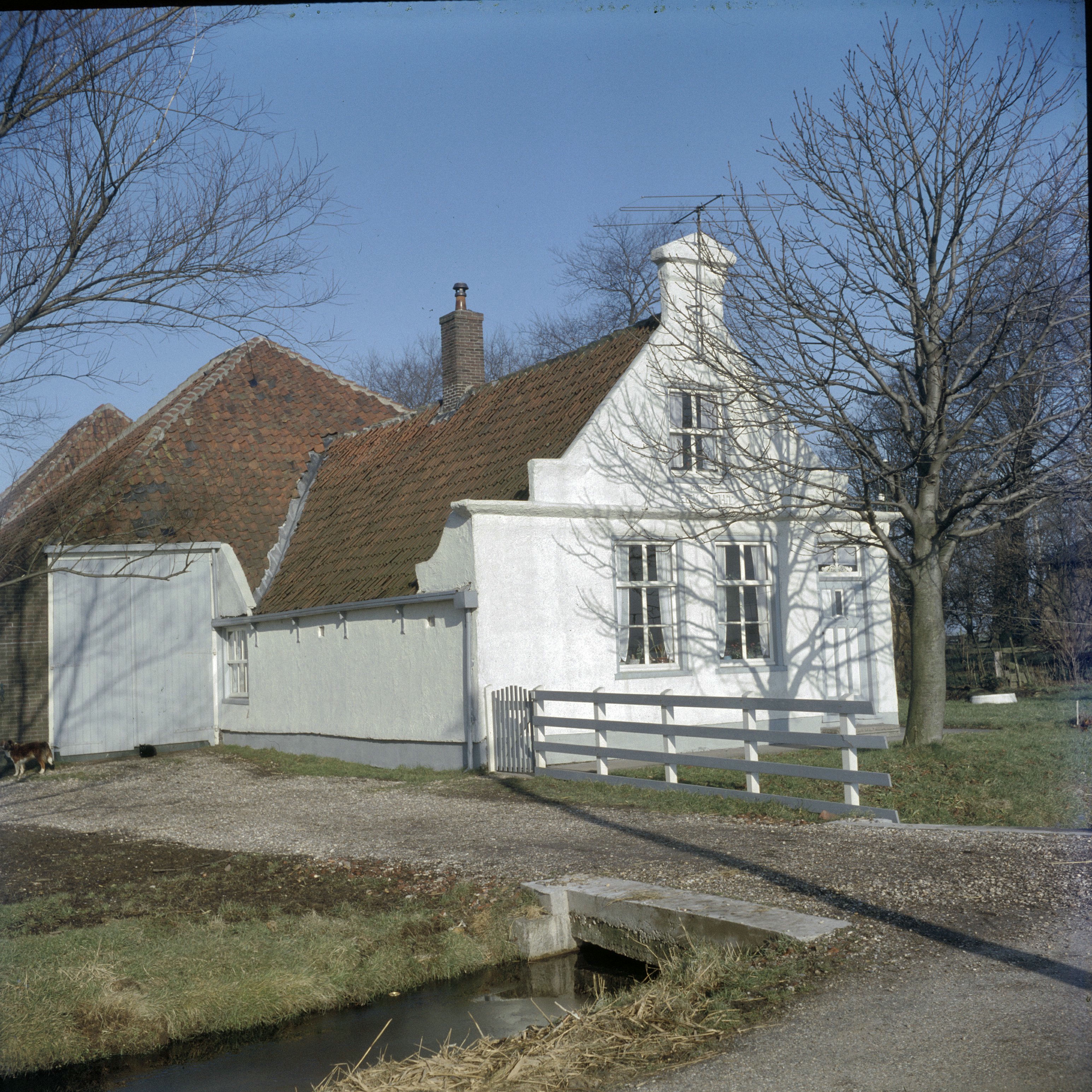
- Farm in Overleek

- Location in the Netherlands Location in the province of North Holland in the Netherlands
- Coordinates: 52.4543°N 4.9979°E
- Country: Netherlands
- Province: North Holland
- Municipality: Waterland
- Time zone: UTC+1 (CET)
  - Summer (DST): UTC+2 (CEST)
- Postal code: 1141
- Dialing code: 0299

Overleek is a hamlet in North Holland, in the municipality of Waterland, close to Monnickendam.

Overleek is not a statistical entity, and the postal authorities have placed it under Monnickendam. It consists of about 30 houses.
