= Marken =

- Village
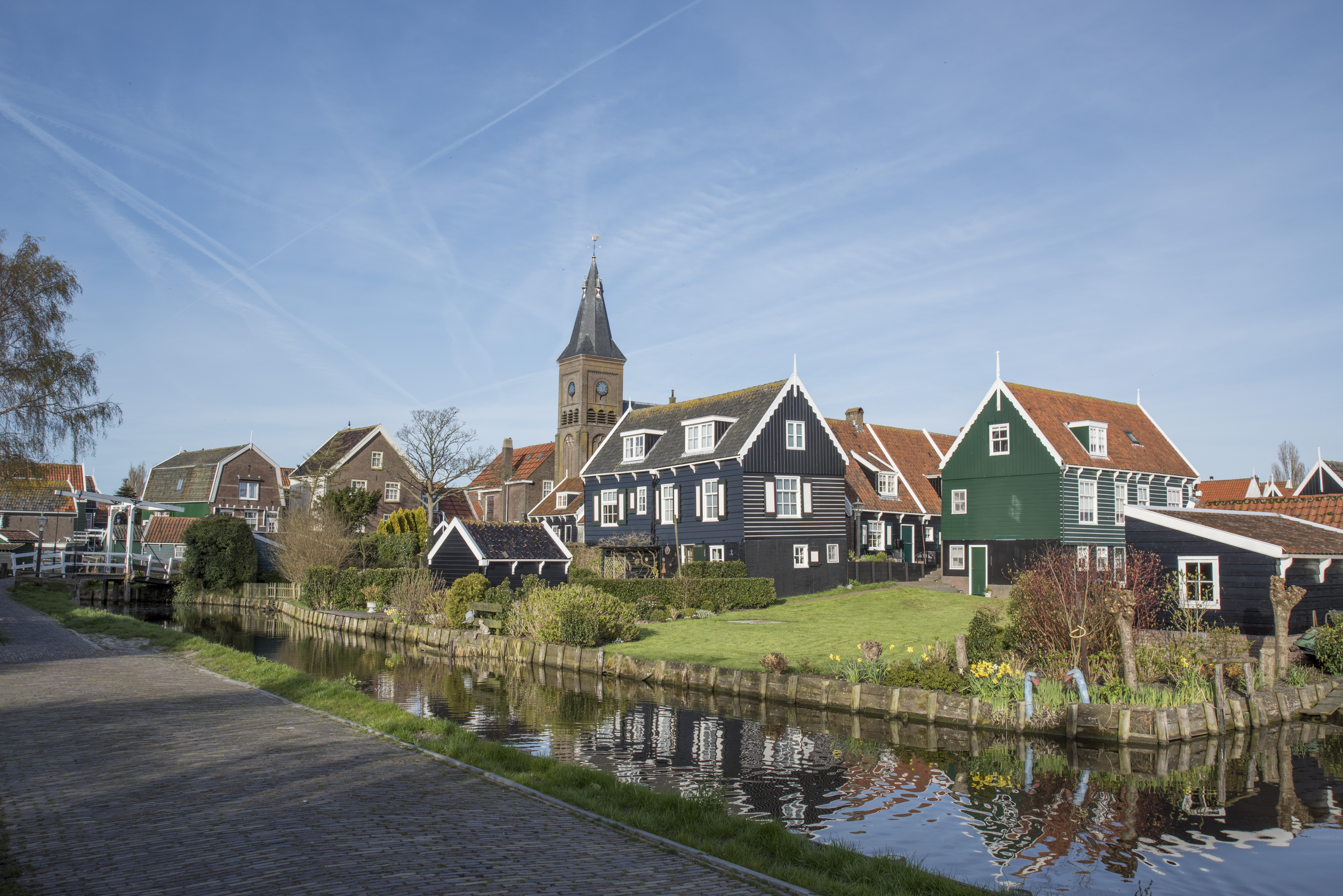
- Marken in 2015

- Flag Coat of arms

- Location in the Netherlands Location in the province of North Holland in the Netherlands
- Coordinates: 52°27′30″N 5°6′24″E
- Country: Netherlands
- Province: North Holland
- Municipality: Waterland

Area
  - Total: 2.67 km^{2} (1.03 sq mi)
- Elevation: −0.5 m (−1.6 ft)

Population (2024)
  - Total: 1,730
  - Density: 648/km^{2} (1,680/sq mi)
- Time zone: UTC+1 (CET)
  - Summer (DST): UTC+2 (CEST)
- Postal code: 1156
- Area code: 0299

Marken (Dutch pronunciation: [ˈmɑrkə(n)]; Marken's dialect: Mereke) is a village in the municipality of Waterland in the province of North Holland, Netherlands. It had a population of 1,730 as of 2024, and occupies a peninsula in the Markermeer. It was, until 1957, an island in the former Zuiderzee. The characteristic wooden houses of Marken are a tourist attraction.

== History ==
=== Early years ===
Until 1164, the area that is now Marken was connected to the mainland. It was located in the east of the low peatland of Waterland, on the border with Lake Flevo. The name Marken means "borderland," referring to it forming the boundary between the water and the peat. In 1164, the Saint Juliana flood (also known as the Jurriaan flood) engulfed the land around Marken, turning it into an island. Due to this and subsequent floods in the 12th and 13th centuries, the North Sea advanced further and further, and the Lake Flevo eventually became the Zuiderzee.

Around 1232, the island was bought by Frisian Premonstratensians. They built the first dike, and through land reclamation, they expanded the island. By draining the water, they transformed the peat soil into pastureland. The built a church and the first settlements in the west and southeast. They mainly lived off livestock farming and founded the settlement of Monnickendam across from Marken as a staple market for their dairy products. In 1345, the Premonstratensians were expelled from Marken as part of the Friso-Hollandic Wars.

For some time during the later 19th and early 20th centuries, Marken and its inhabitants were the focus of considerable attention by folklorists, ethnographers and physical anthropologists, who regarded the small fishing town as a relic of the traditional native culture that was destined to disappear as modernization of the Netherlands gained pace. Among them were Johann Friedrich Blumenbach who examined a human skull from the island which he called Batavus genuinus; and the Belgian painter Xavier Mellery who stayed in Marken at the request of Charles De Coster. Mellery was asked to create illustrative work and delivered several intimist works.

Cornelis Lely's designs incorporated the island into a proposed Markerwaard. A partial dike, built in 1941 in the north, is the first phase of that project which was stopped by World War II.

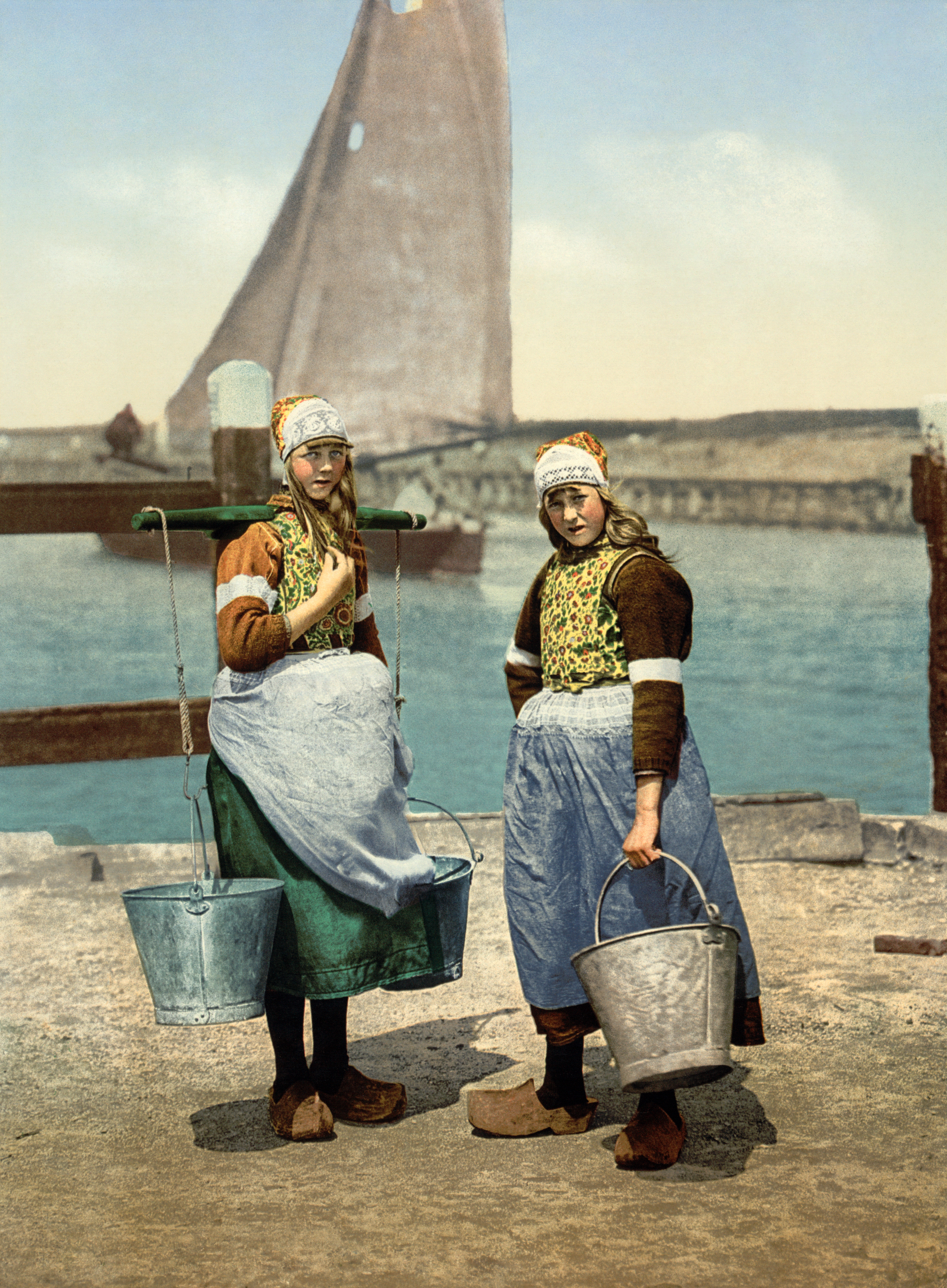
Girls in traditional costumes (circa 1900)

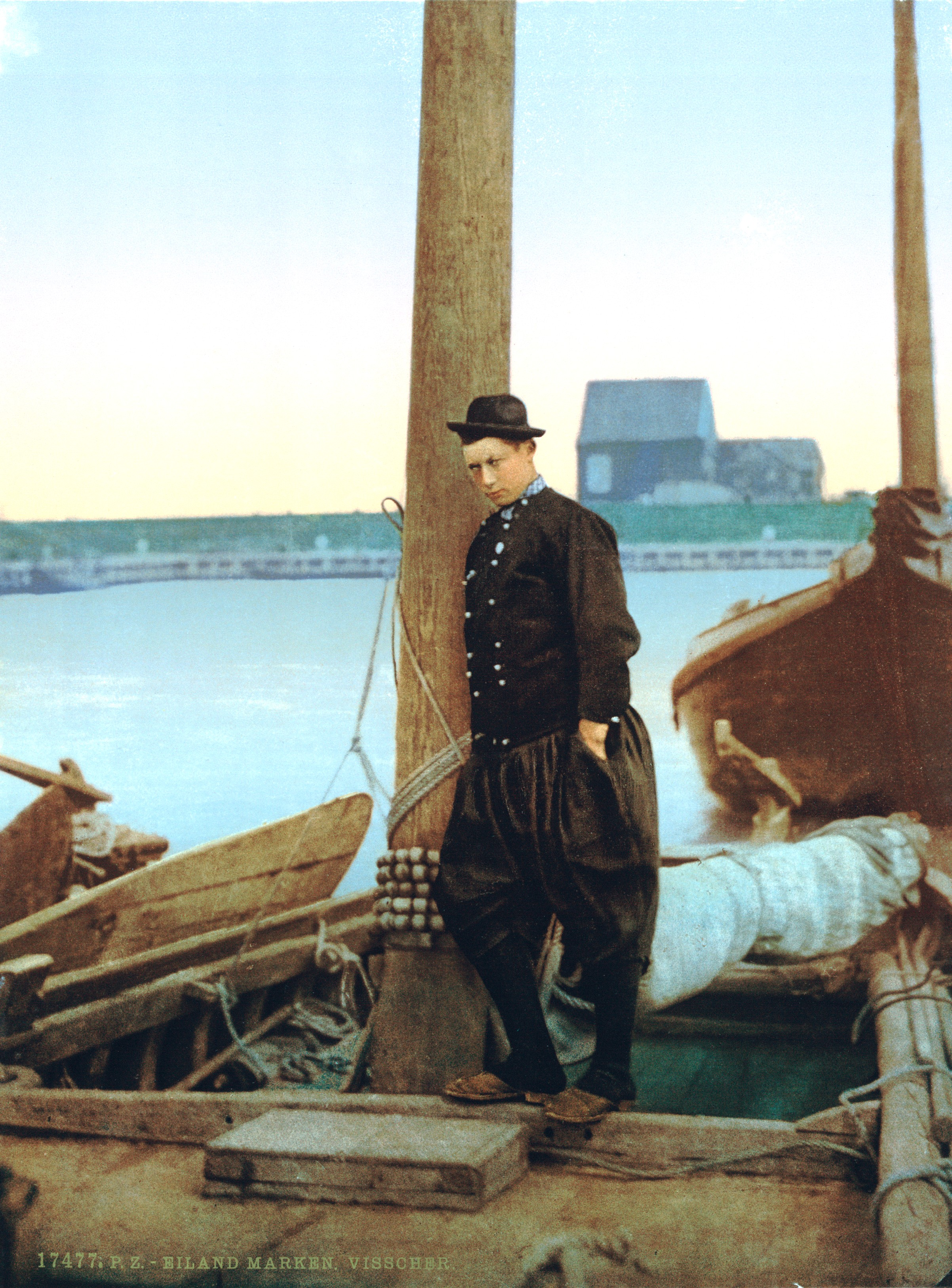
Fisherman in traditional costume (circa 1900)

=== Recent times ===
The island appeared as a location in the 1970 film Puppet on a Chain. In 1983, the Marker Museum about the history of the island was opened. Marken was a separate municipality until 1991, when it was merged into Waterland.

== Geography ==
Marken is in the municipality of Waterland in the east of the province of North Holland in the west of the Netherlands. Marken is a peninsula in the Markermeer, of which is it is the namesake, and is connected to the mainland of North Holland by a causeway.

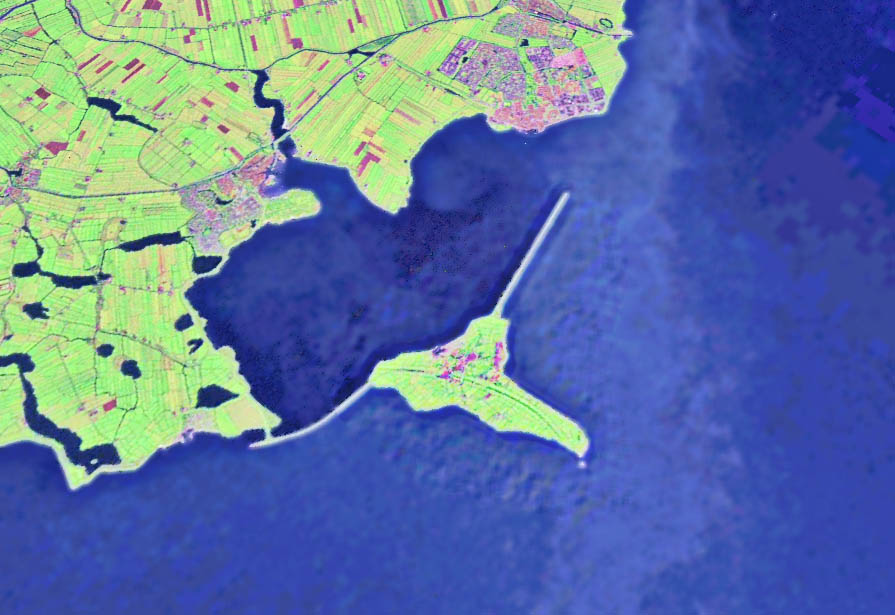
Satellite image

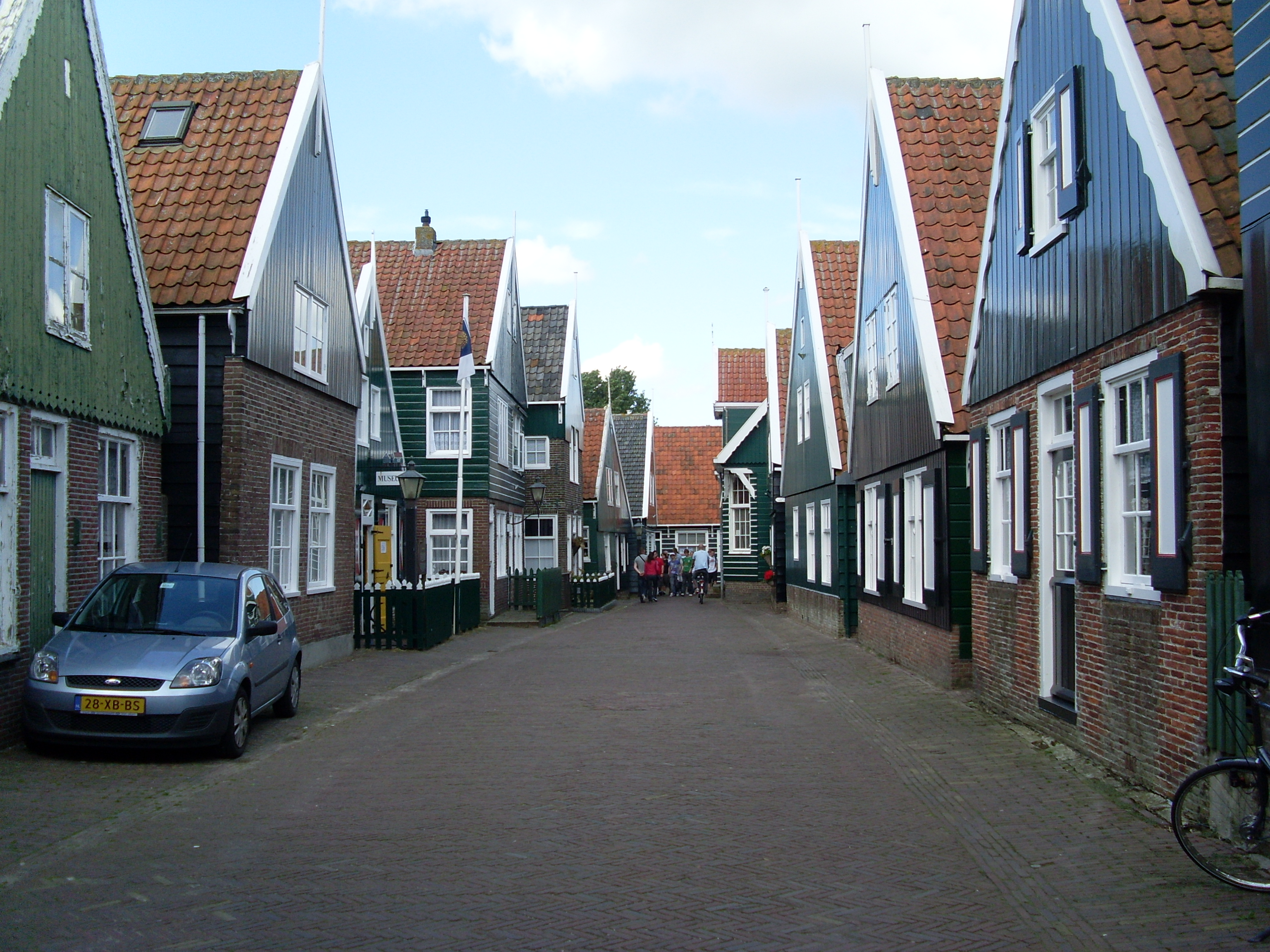
Street in 2009

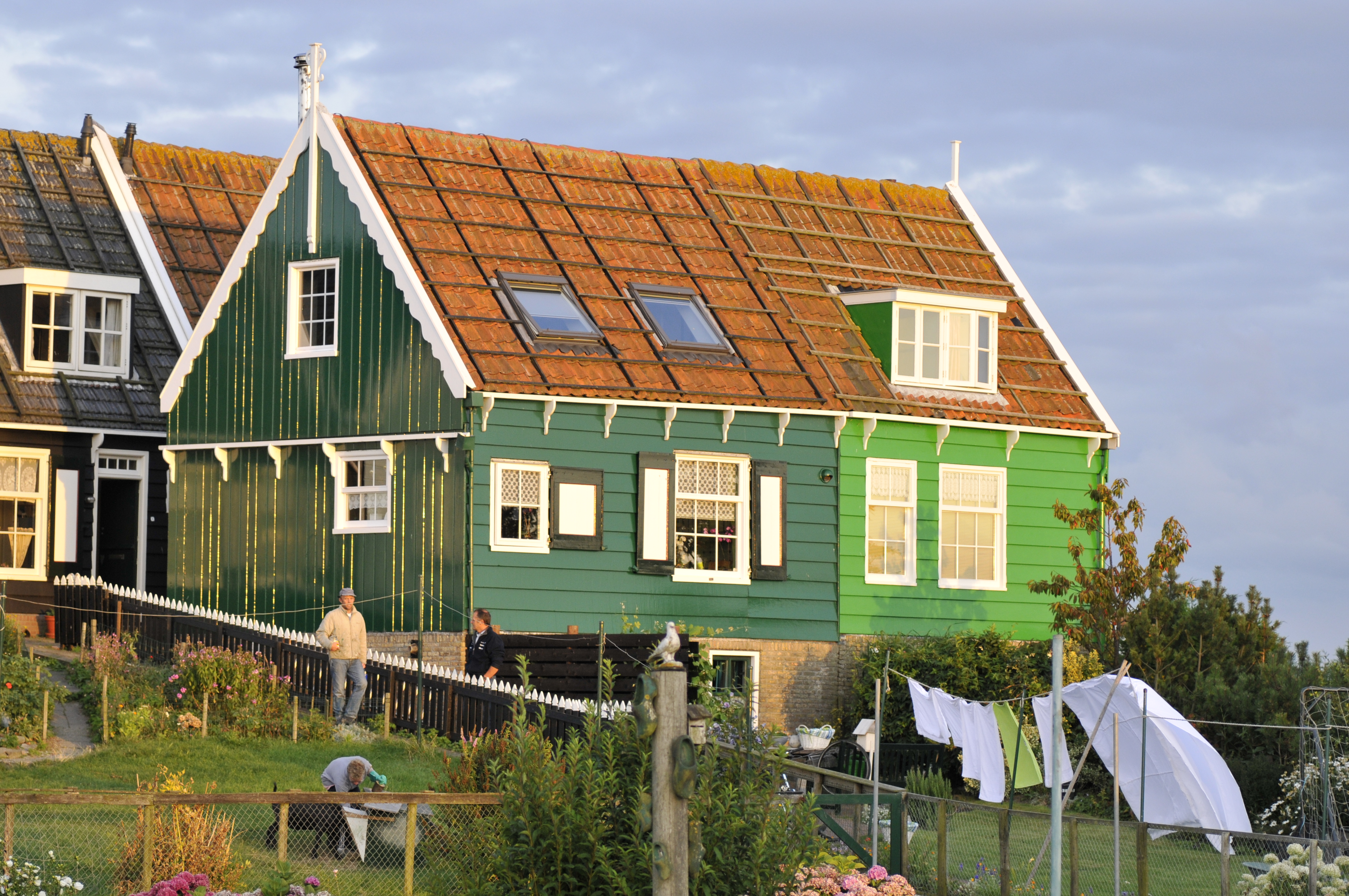
Wooden house

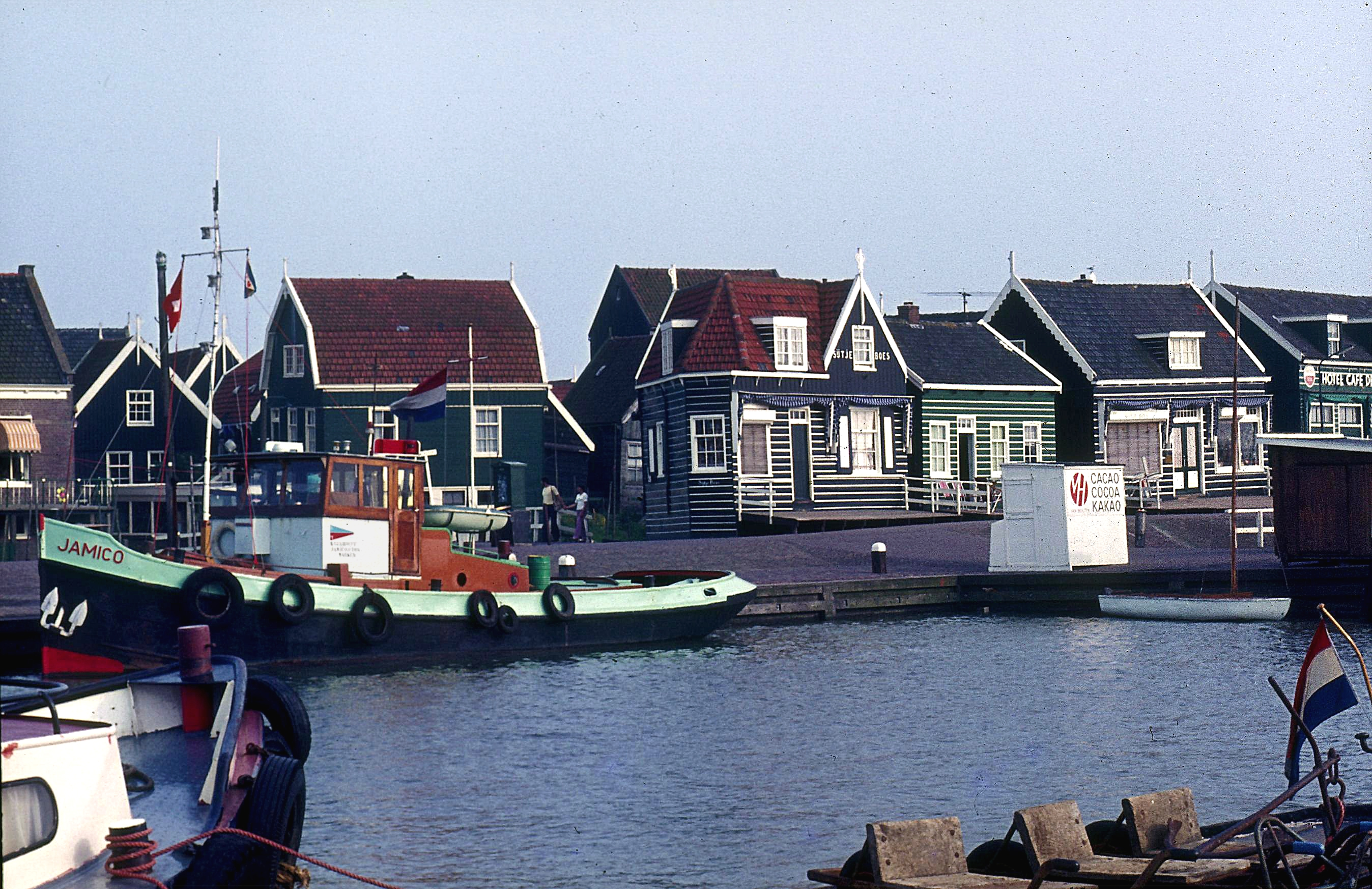
Havenbuurt about 1970
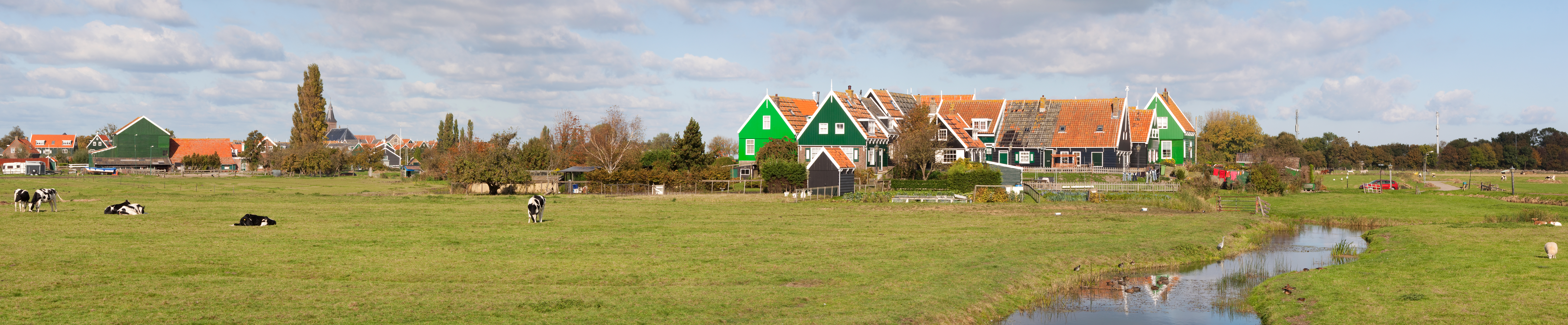
A panorama of Marken showing the community of Grote Werf with the village of Marken in the background

== Source ==
- Schutte, G.J.; Weitkamp, J.B. (1998). Marken. De geschiedenis van een eiland [Marken. The history of an island.] (in Dutch). Uitgeverij Bert Bakker. ISBN 90-351-1902-9.
