= Ilpendam =

- Village
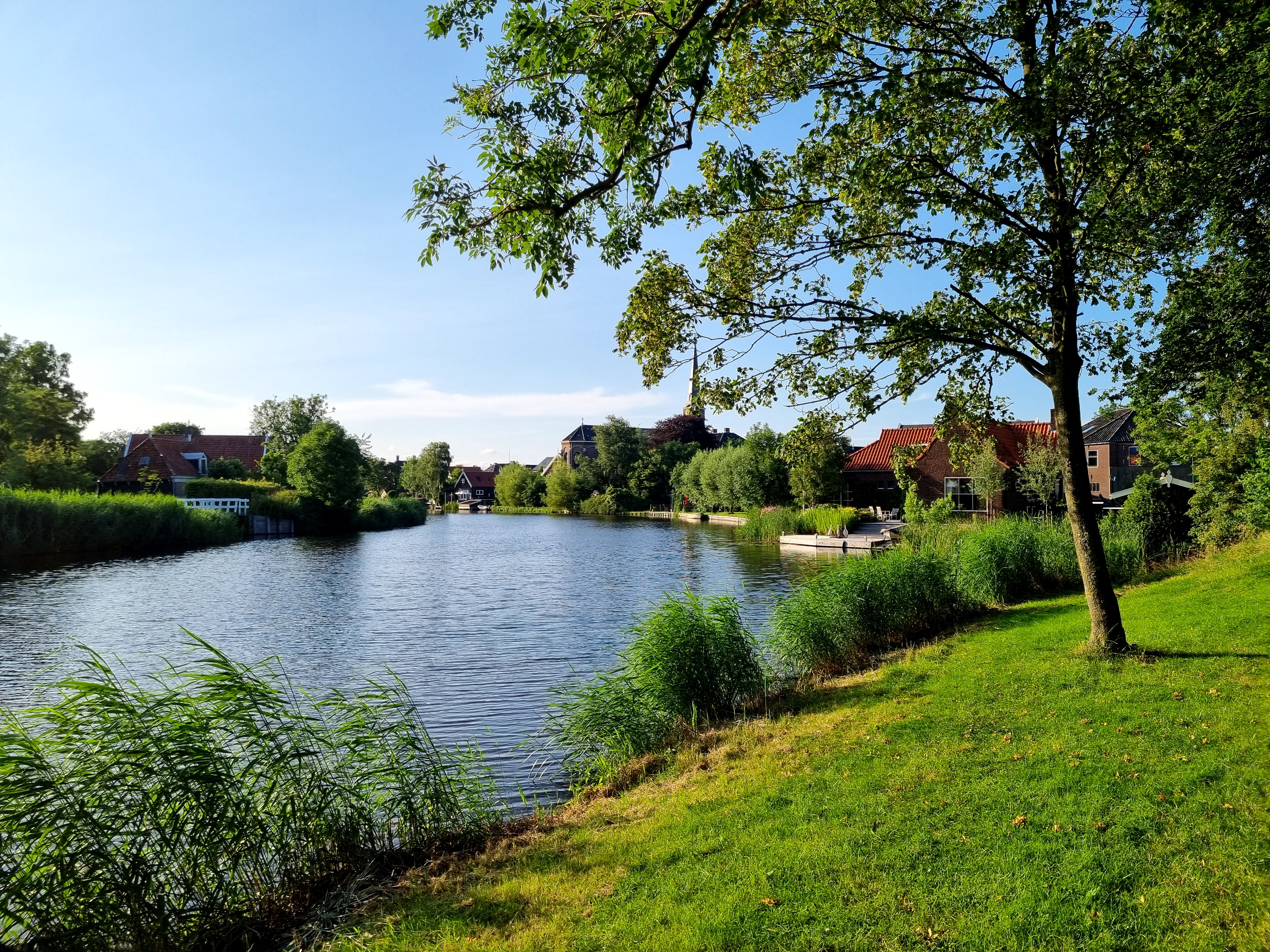

- Flag Coat of arms

- Location in the Netherlands Location in the province of North Holland in the Netherlands
- Coordinates: 52°28′N 4°57′E
- Country: Netherlands
- Province: North Holland
- Municipality: Waterland

Area
  - Total: 2.47 km^{2} (0.95 sq mi)
- Elevation: −3.2 m (−10 ft)

Population (2021)
  - Total: 1,785
  - Density: 723/km^{2} (1,870/sq mi)
- Time zone: UTC+1 (CET)
  - Summer (DST): UTC+2 (CEST)
- Postal code: 1452
- Dialing code: 020

Ilpendam is a village in the province of North Holland, Netherlands. It is a part of the municipality of Waterland, and lies about 4 km south of Purmerend. It covers an area of 2.46 km^{2} (0.95 sq mi) and had 1,780 inhabitants in 2008. Ilpendam was part of the Free and high Lordship of Purmerend, Purmerland and Ilpendam.

== History ==
The village was first mentioned in 1408 as Ypeldamme, and means "dam in the Ilp river". Ilpendam developed in the 12th century at the mouth of the Ilp as a linear settlement.

The Dutch Reformed church is a single aisled church built in 1656 to replace the medieval church burnt down in 1640. The tower was built in 1855.

The man standing highlighted at centre on Rembrandts Night Watch painting is Frans Banning Cocq. He was Mayor of Amsterdam, Lord of Purmerland and Ilpendam and Lord of Ilpenstein castle.

Ilpendam was a separate municipality until 1991.

Until 1872 there was a castle, called Ilpenstein, of the Lordship of Purmerland and Ilpendam.

== Notable persons of Ilpendam ==
- Gerrit de Graeff (IV) van Zuid-Polsbroek (1797–1870), vrijheer van Zuid-Polsbroek, Purmerland and Ilpendam, patrician of Amsterdam
- Mona Keijzer (born 1968), politician

== Gallery ==
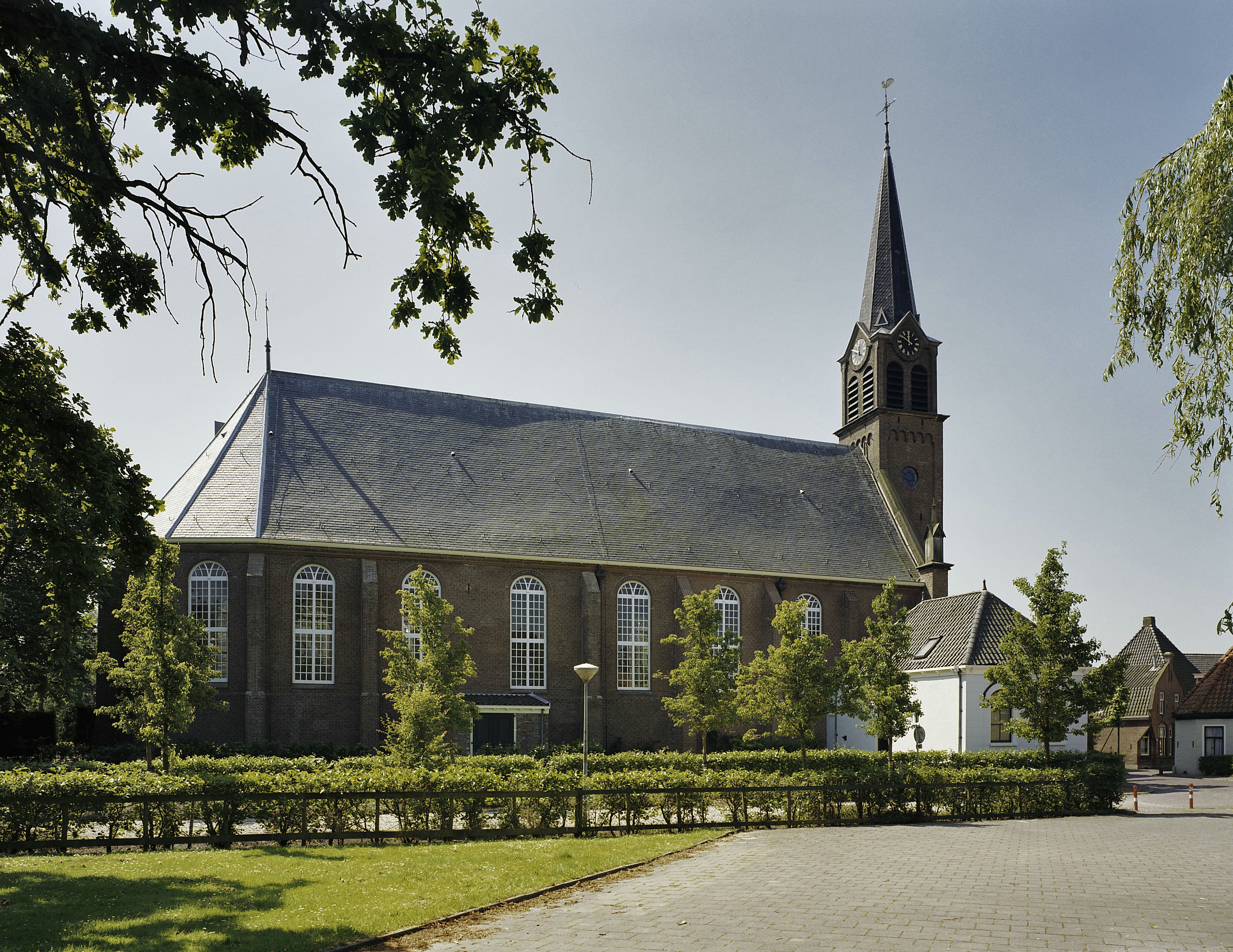
Dutch Reformed church

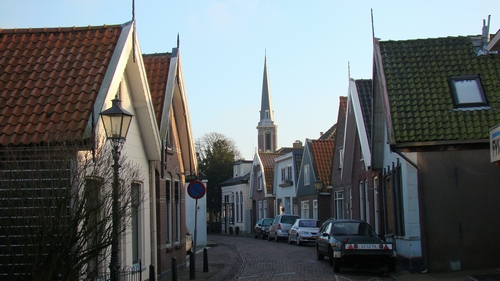
Street view

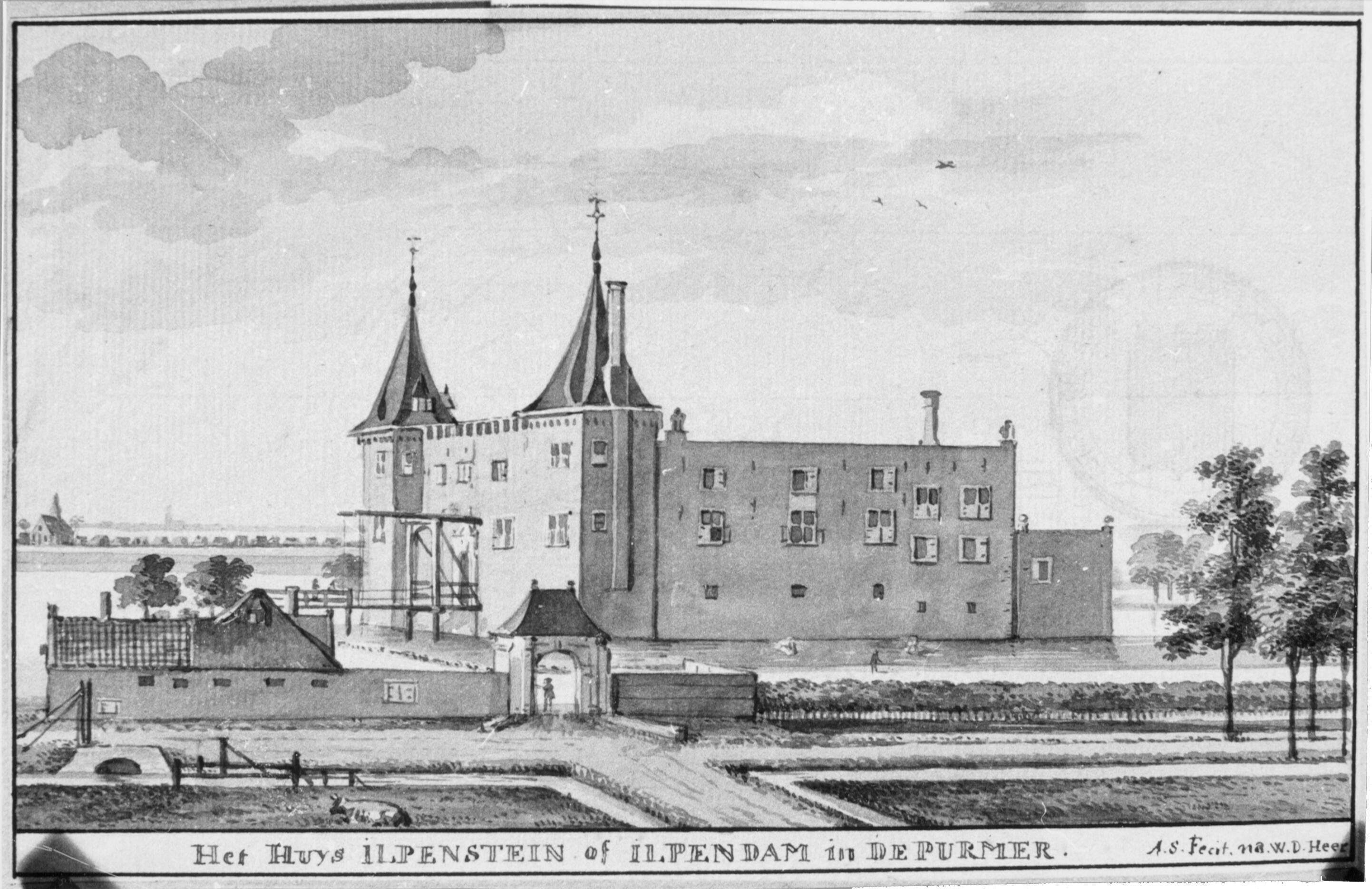
Ilpenstein Castle (18th century)

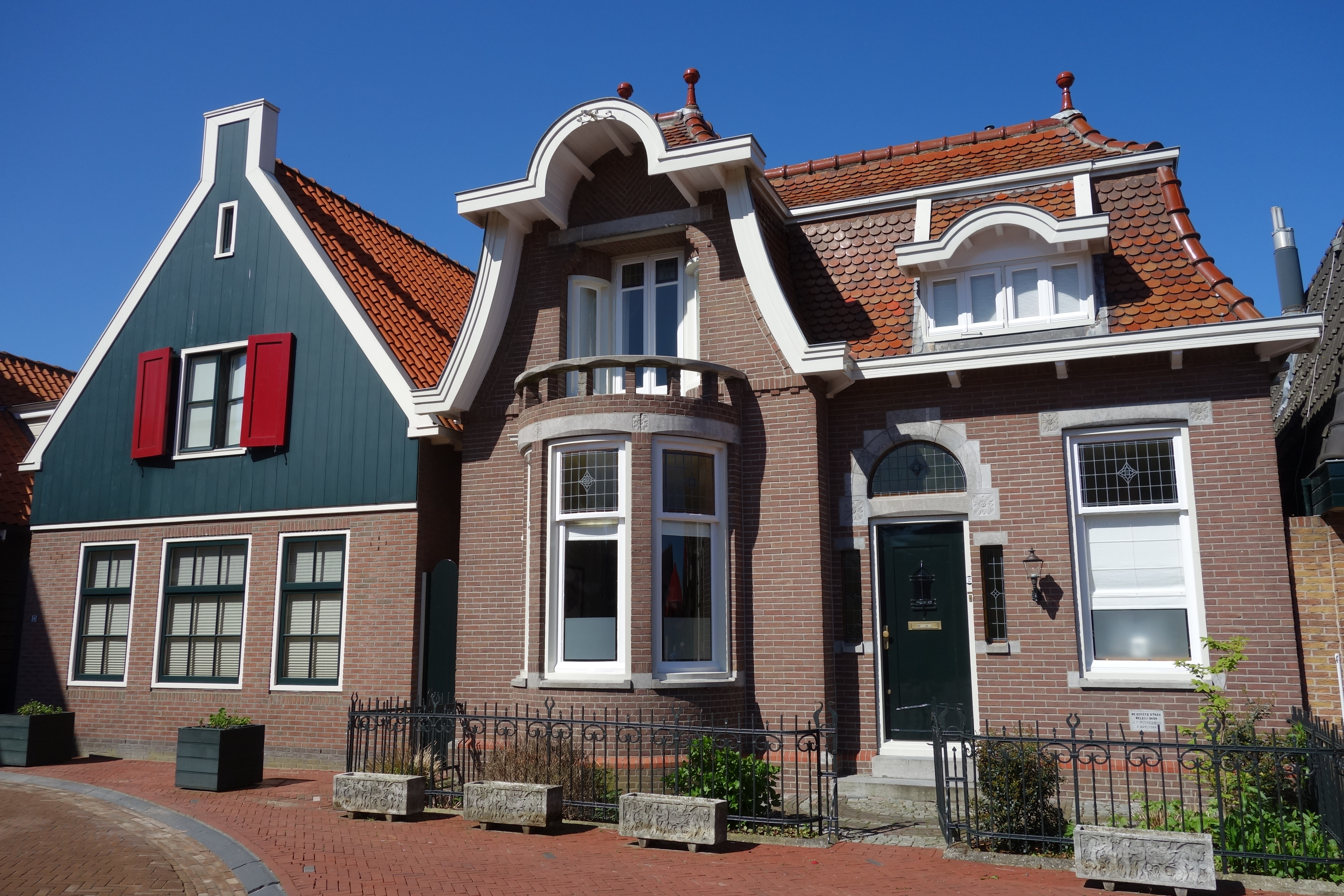
Houses in Ilpendam

== See also ==
- Free and high Lordship of Purmerend, Purmerland and Ilpendam
