= Waterland =

- Municipality
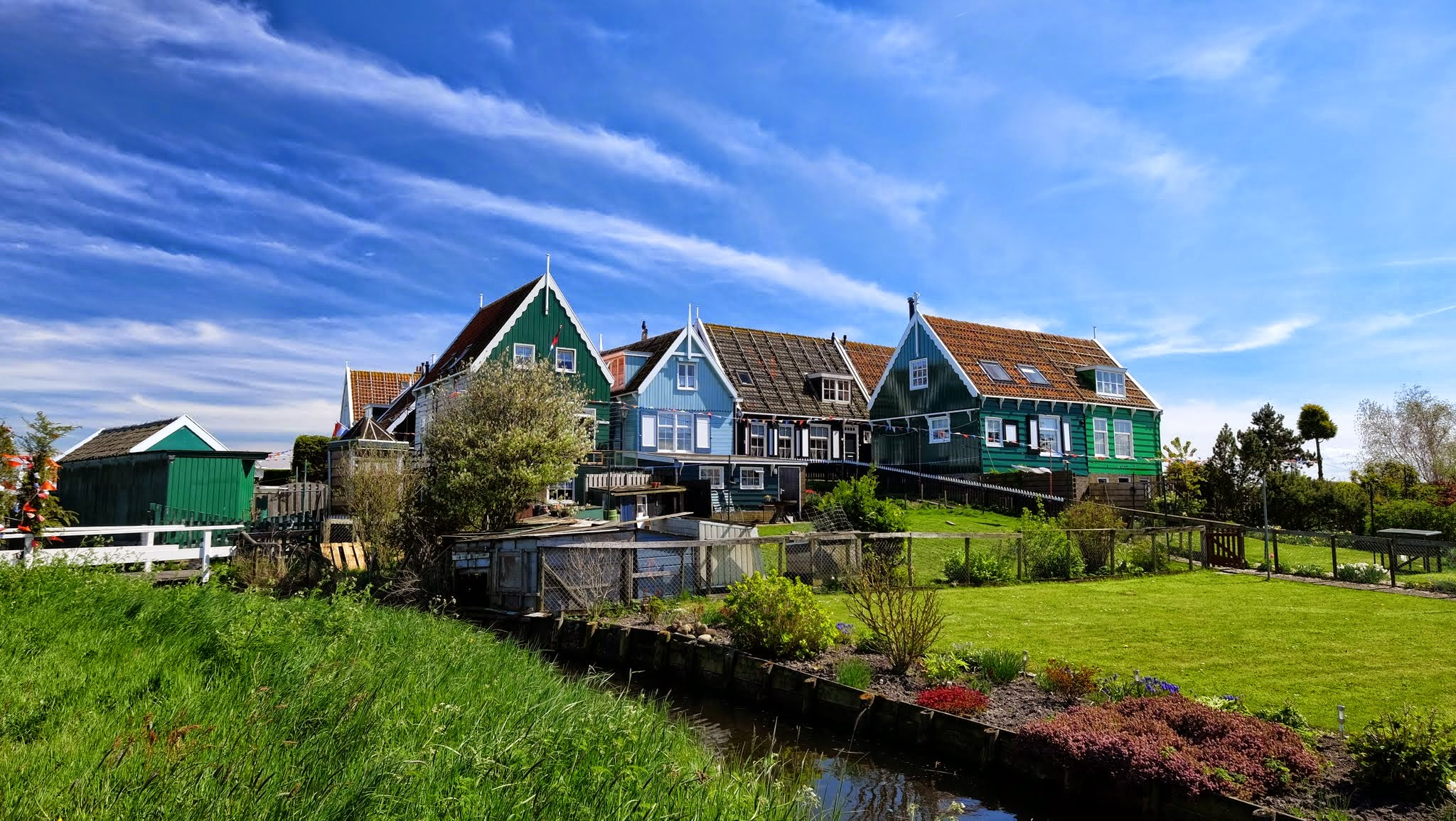
- Marken, municipality of Waterland

- Flag Coat of arms

- Location in North Holland
- Coordinates: 52°27′N 5°2′E
- Country: Netherlands
- Province: North Holland
- Established: 1 January 1991

Government
  - Body: Municipal council
  - Mayor: Marian van der Weele (D66)

Area
  - Total: 115.66 km^{2} (44.66 sq mi)
  - Land: 52.11 km^{2} (20.12 sq mi)
  - Water: 63.55 km^{2} (24.54 sq mi)
- Elevation: −1 m (−3.3 ft)

Population (January 2021)
  - Total: 17,312
  - Density: 332/km^{2} (860/sq mi)
- Demonym: Waterlander
- Time zone: UTC+1 (CET)
  - Summer (DST): UTC+2 (CEST)
- Postcode: 1140–1156, 1452–1454
- Area code: 0299
- Website: www.waterland.nl

Waterland (Dutch pronunciation: [ˈʋaːtərlɑnt]) is a municipality in the Netherlands, in the province of North Holland. It is situated north of Amsterdam, on the western shore of the Markermeer. It includes the tourist towns of Broek in Waterland and Marken.

== Population centres ==
The municipality of Waterland contains the following city, small towns and villages:

- Broek in Waterland
- Ilpendam
- Katwoude
- Marken
- Monnickendam
- Overleek
- Purmer
- Uitdam
- Watergang
- Zuiderwoude

=== Topography ===
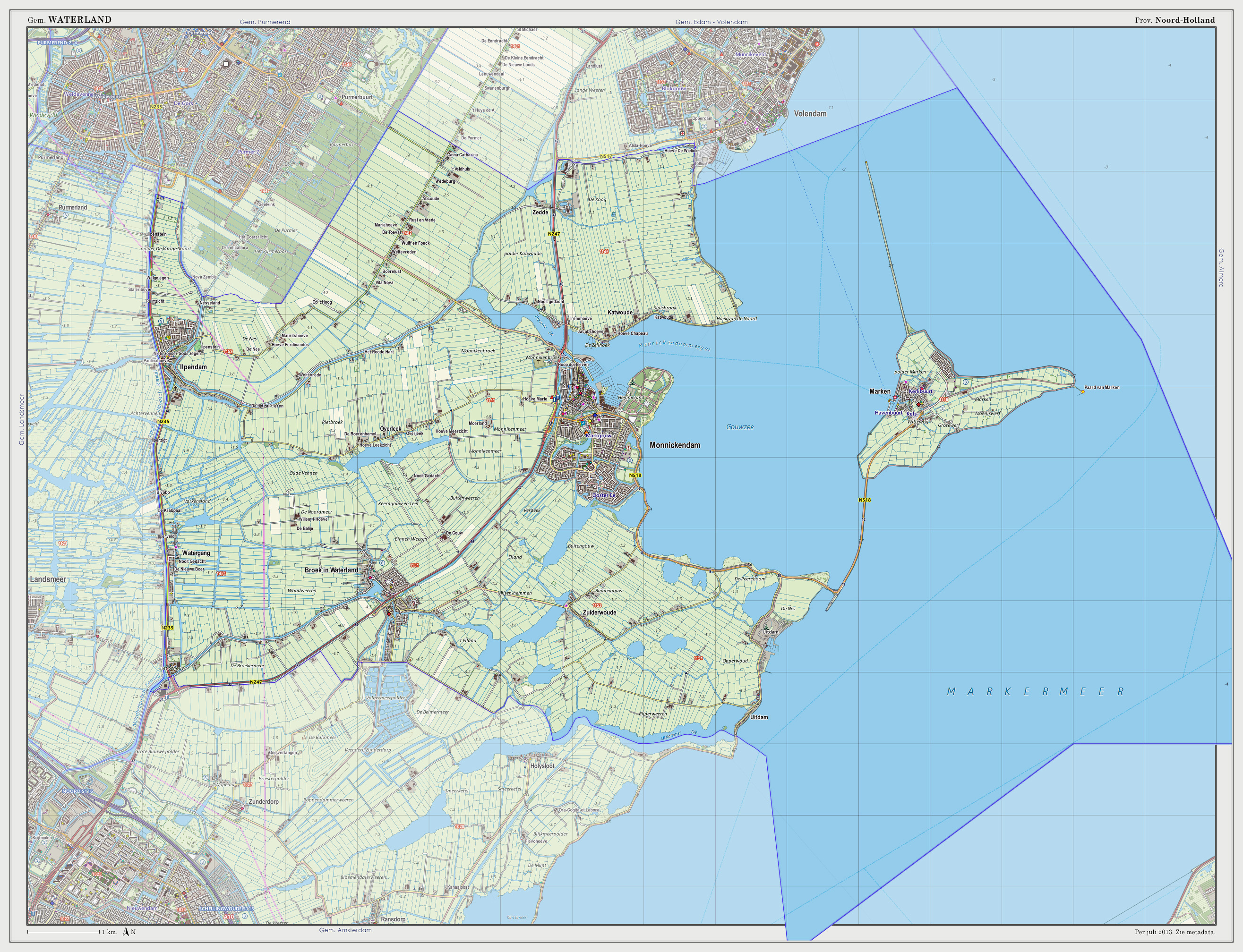
Map of the municipality of Waterland, 2013.

== History ==
The area was populated since the 11th century. Between 1619 and 1811, the villages of Ransdorp, Zunderdorp, Schellingwoude, Landsmeer, Broek in Waterland, en Zuiderwoude formed a union, known as the Waterland Union (Dutch: Unie van Waterland), mainly with the goal of joint maintenance of the coast. On the other hand, Monnickendam was a seat of a bailiff and has never been part of this union. In 1921, Ransdorp (with Schellingwoude) and Zunderdorp were merged into the city of Amsterdam.

The municipality of Waterland was established in 1991 by merging the municipalities of Broek in Waterland, Katwoude, Marken, and Monnickendam, as well as parts of the municipalities of Ilpendam (the village of Ilpendam) and Landsmeer (the villages of Watergang and Schouw). Monnickendam became the municipality seat.

== Geography ==
The lands of the municipality are mainly peat. Marken is a former island.

== Local government ==
The municipal council of Waterland consists of 17 seats, which at the 2026 election divided as follows:

GroenLinks/PvdA – 5 seats; VVD – 4 seats	CDA – 4 seats; WaterlandNatuurlijk – 3 seats	D66 – 1 seat

== Notable people ==
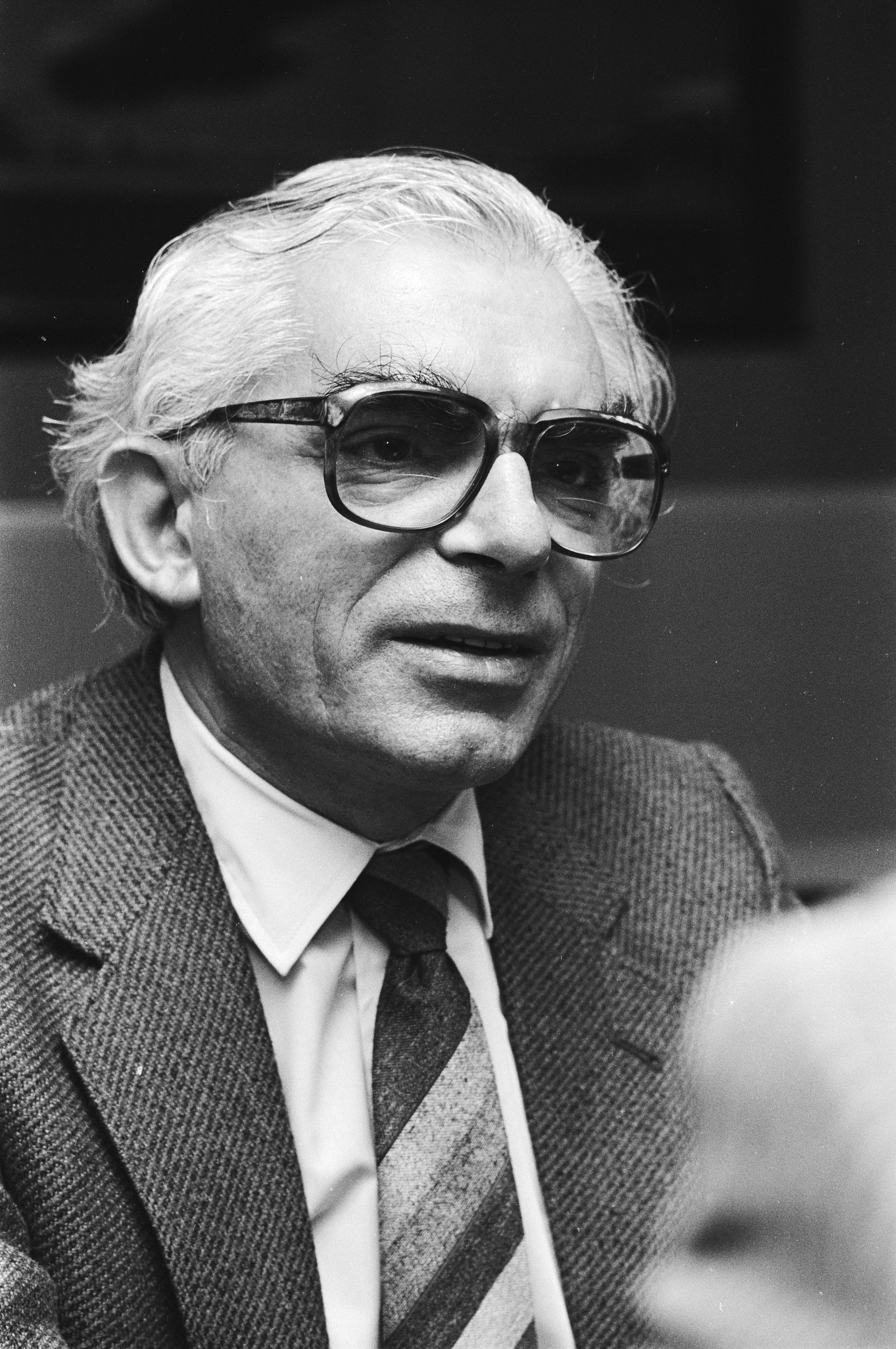
Wim Polak, 1982

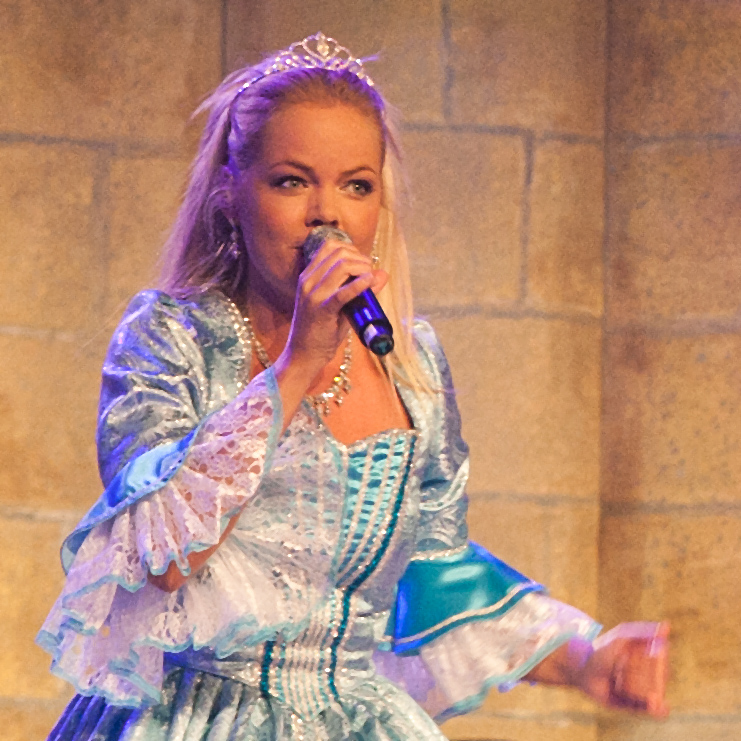
Sita Vermeulen, 2011

- Pieter Floriszoon (1602 or 1606 in Monnickendam–1658) a Dutch Vice Admiral in the Battle of the Sound
- Alexander Johan Berman (1828 in Zierikzee–1886) the Dutch Reformed minister of Watergang
- Pieter Groenhart (1894 in Ilpendam – 1965) a lichenologist, researched tropical Asian lichens
- Wim Polak (1924–1999) a politician, lived in Ilpendam, Mayor of Amsterdam 1977/1983
- Peter Spier (1927–2017) a Dutch-American illustrator and writer of children's books, grew up in Broek in Waterland
- Michaël Zeeman (1958 in Marken – 2009) a journalist, author, editor, columnist and literary critic
- Sita (born 1980 in Ilpendam) aka Sita Maria Vermeulen, a pop singer

=== Sport ===
- Jurjaan Koolen (1938 in Monnickendam–2020) a volleyball player, competed in the 1964 Summer Olympics
- Marko Klok (born 1968 in Monnickendam) a volleyball player, silver medallist in the 1992 Summer Olympics
- Annette Gerritsen (born 1985 in Ilpendam) a former speed skater, silver medallist at the 2010 Winter Olympics

== Gallery ==
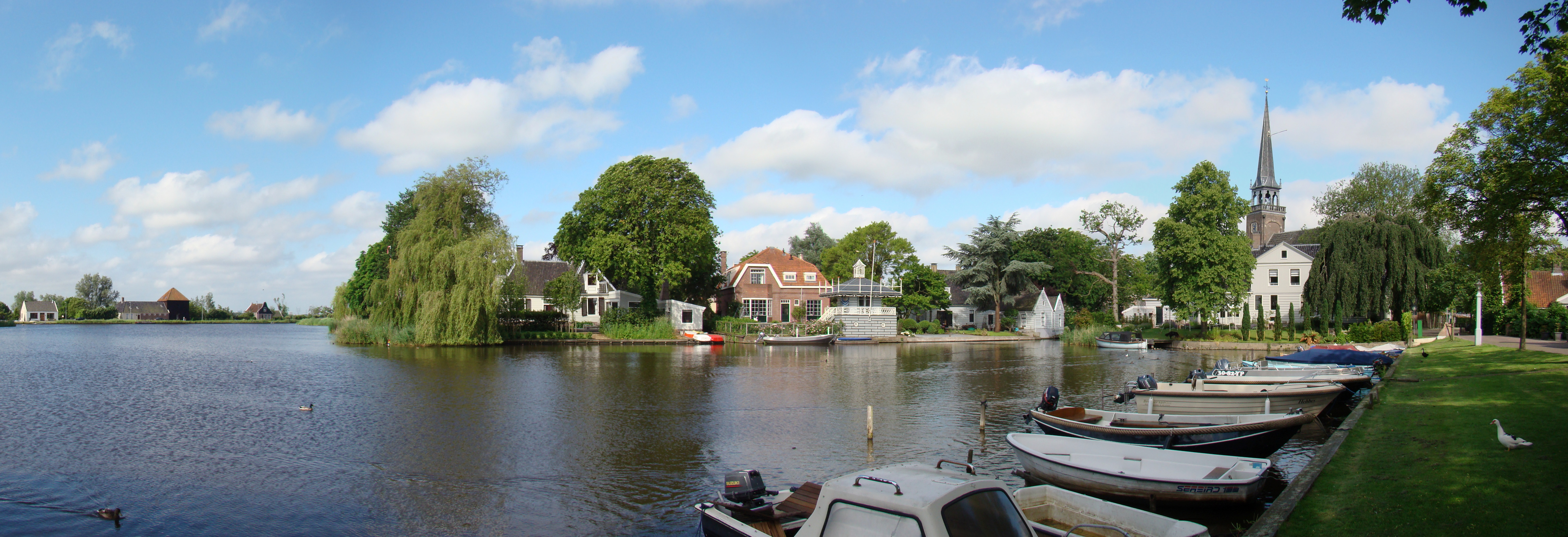
Broek in Waterland

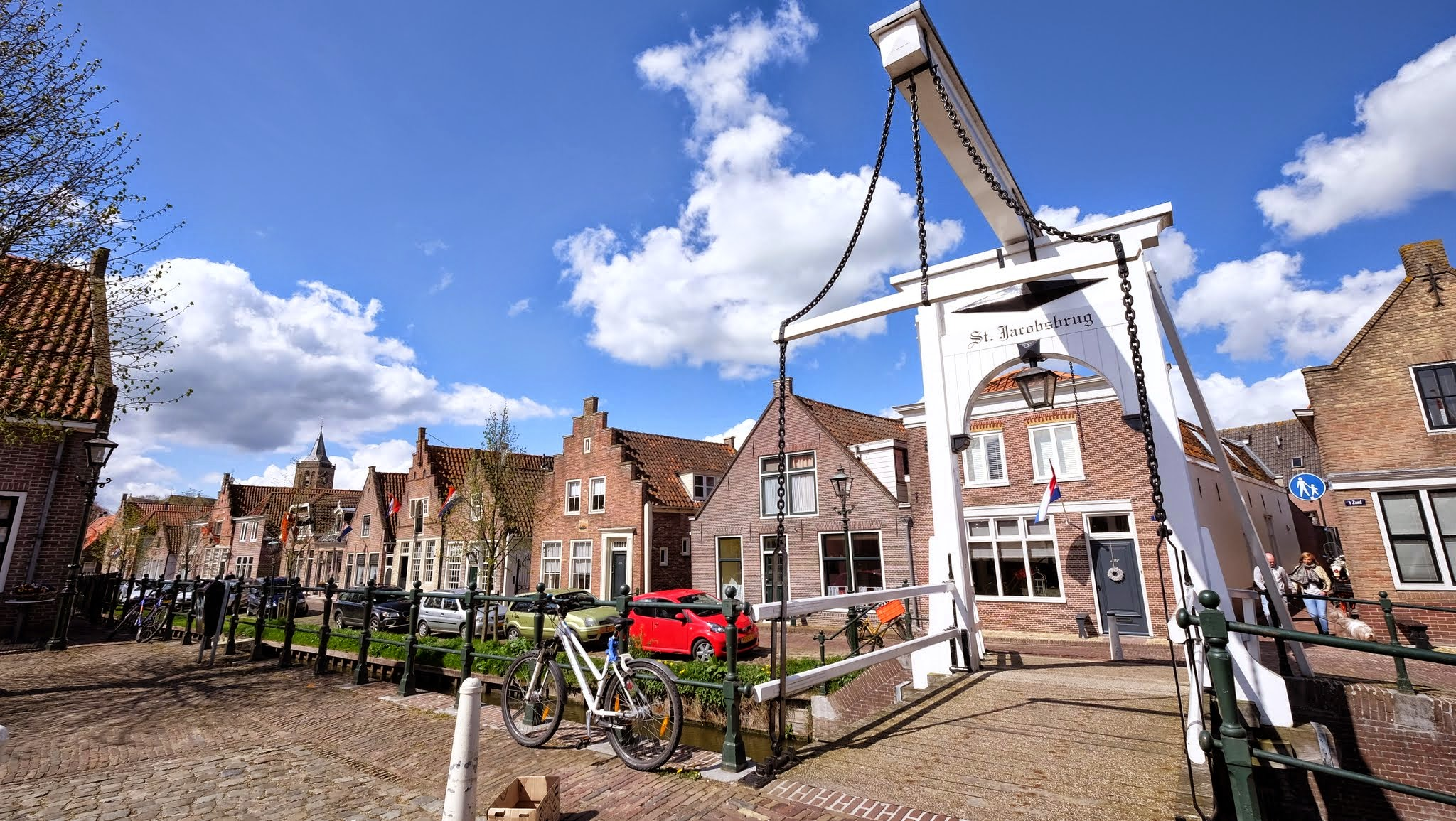
Monnickendam

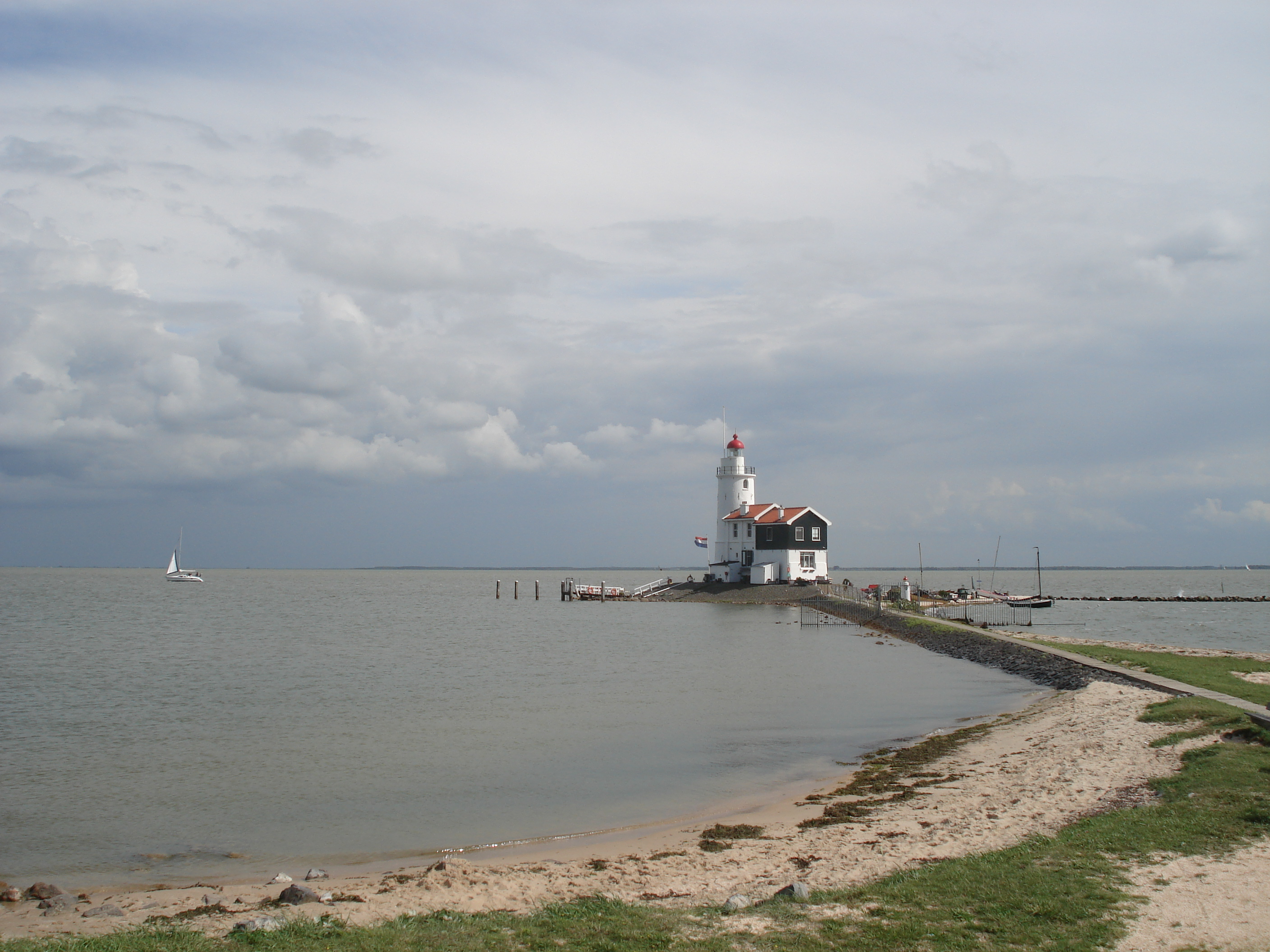
Paard van Marken

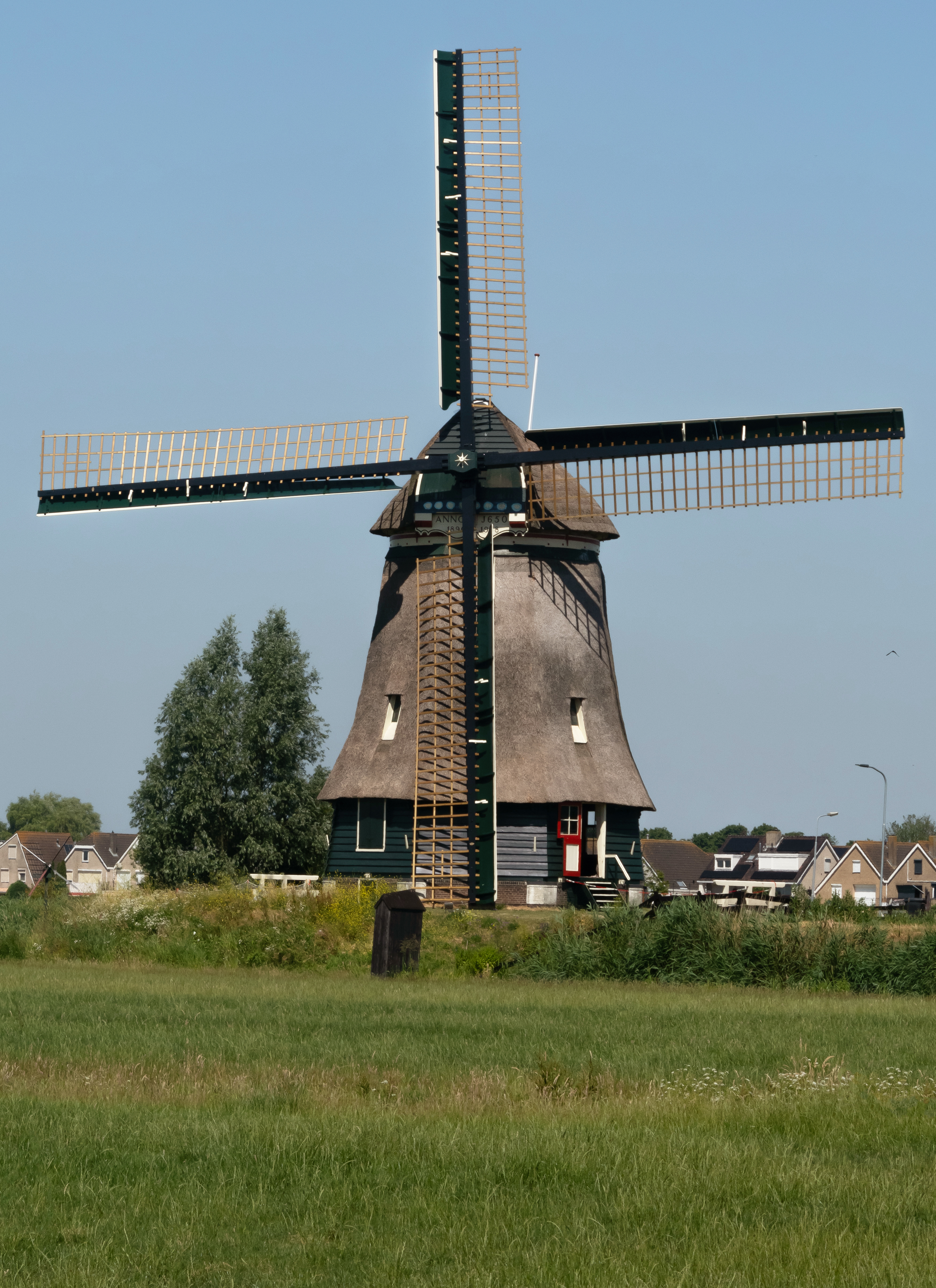
Katwoude
