= Broek in Waterland =

- Village
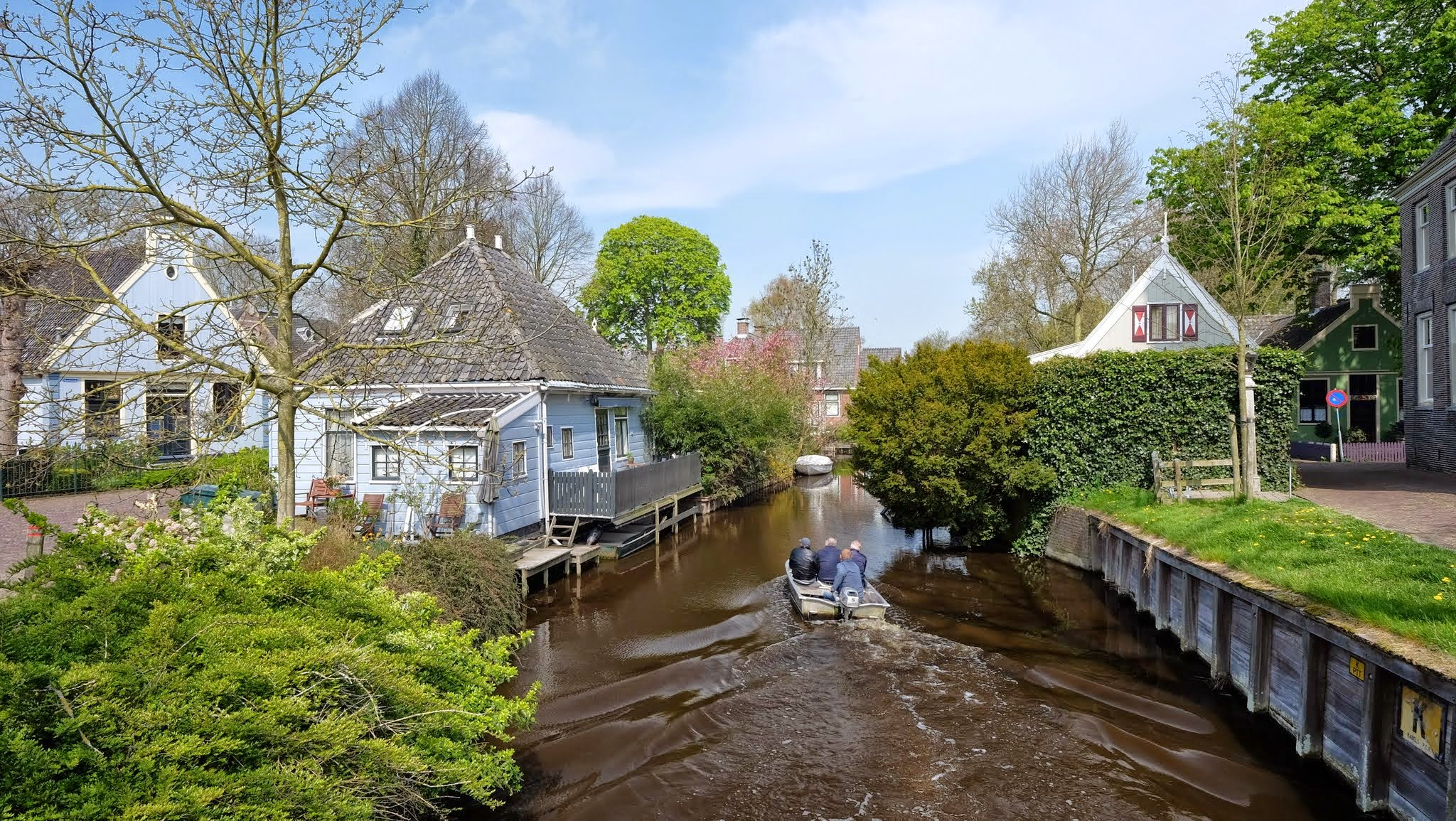

- Flag Coat of arms

- Location in the Netherlands Location in the province of North Holland in the Netherlands
- Coordinates: 52°26′10″N 4°59′39″E
- Country: Netherlands
- Province: North Holland
- Municipality: Waterland

Area
  - Total: 10.70 km^{2} (4.13 sq mi)
- Elevation: −0.5 m (−1.6 ft)

Population (2021)
  - Total: 2,745
  - Density: 256.5/km^{2} (664.4/sq mi)
- Time zone: UTC+1 (CET)
  - Summer (DST): UTC+2 (CEST)
- Postal code: 1151
- Dialing code: 020

Broek in Waterland is a village in the province of North Holland, Netherlands, with a population of about 2,745 inhabitants as of 2021. It is a part of the municipality of Waterland, and is situated about 8 km (5 miles) south of Purmerend and 8 km (5 miles) northeast of Amsterdam.

In the 17th and 18th century, the village was a popular residence for merchants and seafarers from Amsterdam. Due to its monument status, much of its history has been preserved.

== History ==
=== Early years ===
Many of the houses in the village date back to before 1850. Before 1940 there had been only limited housing development. This meant that many houses were divided to accommodate several families under the same roof.

The church of Broek in Waterland was built before 1400 and was dedicated to Saint Nicolas. On 26 September 1573, the church was razed to the ground by Spaniards during the Eighty Years' War. In 1628 the inhabitants of Broek in Waterland started to rebuild the church on the foundations of the old building.

The pulpit was donated to the church in 1685 by a wealthy couple who were married there in 1641. It is made of ebony, rosewood and pallisander wood, which give it a dark colour and delicate texture. The church organ was built in 1832 by Wander Beekes. The church was extensively renovated in 1989. During this renovation, the original ceiling frescoes of cherubs and fruit garlands were rediscovered under old layers of paint.

=== Tourist attraction ===
Broek in Waterland was a popular vacation village for sea captains in the 1600s.

The town has always been famous for its cleanliness. Many 17th and 18th century travel books of foreign travellers mentioned the cleanliness and tidiness of the village.

The extreme cleanliness of Broek in Waterland led French visitors in the first half of the eighteenth century to dub this dairying village "le temple de la propreté hollandaise".

=== Toxic chemical dump ===
Just to the south of the town was the site of a major landfill. More than 10,000 drums of toxic chemical refuse was dumped here in the 1960s, most containing dioxin-rich 2,4,5-T, which was being produced in Amsterdam by the former company Philips Duphar (although they were cleared of responsibility by the courts), which were produced as the main defoliating ingredient of the Agent Orange formula, supplied to the Americans for their war in Vietnam, but other potentially hazardous chemicals were dumped here in large quantities, such as MCPA, lindane, and Tedion. The extent of the pollution was uncovered in 1980, after it was decided that cleaning up the chemicals was too difficult, in 2003 authorities began to blanket the site with a new layer of topsoil, and in 2011 the area was (partially) re-opened as a 'nature' area.

=== Part of the municipality of Waterland ===
Broek in Waterland was a separate municipality until 1991, when it was merged with Waterland.

== Gallery ==
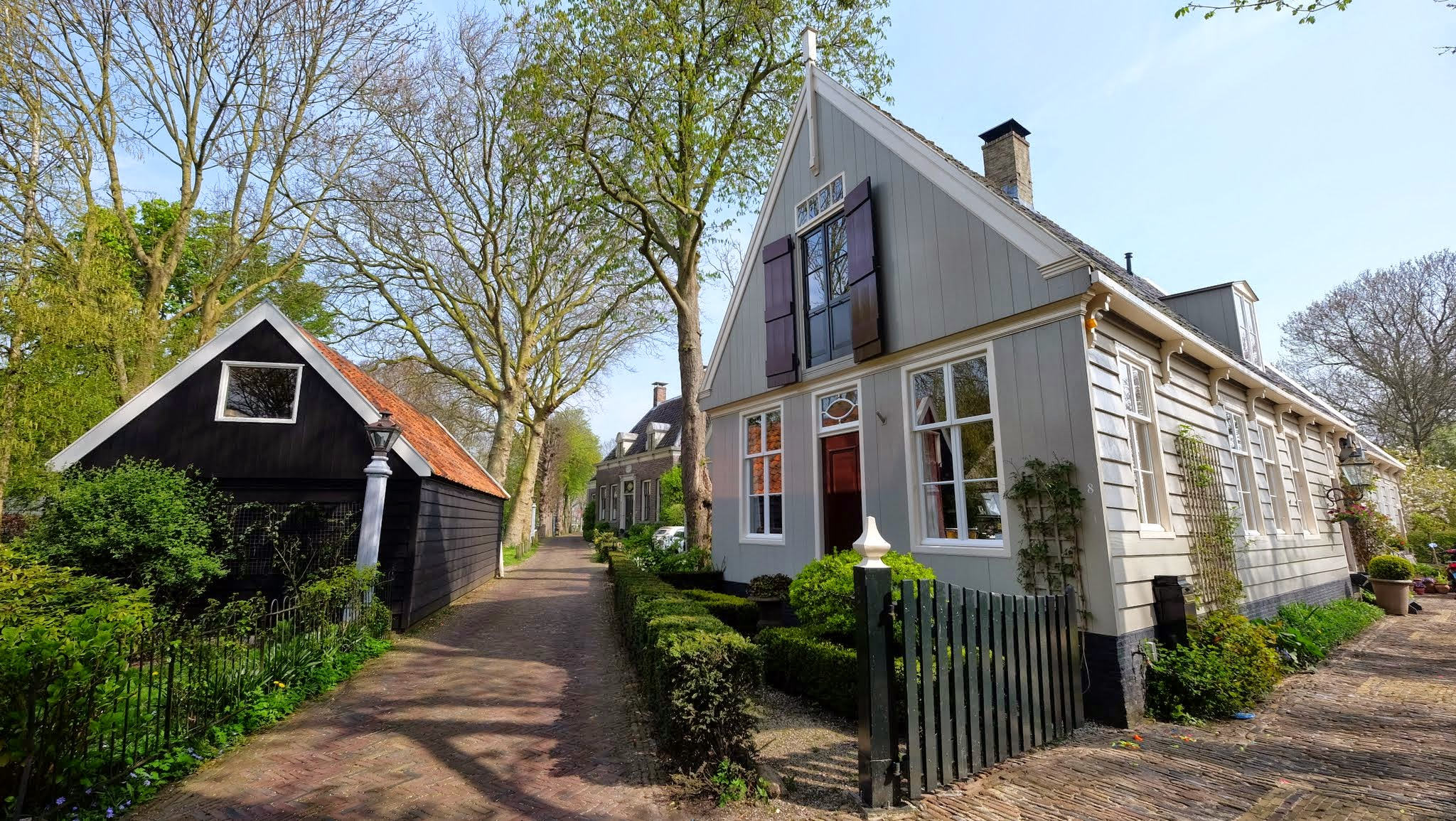

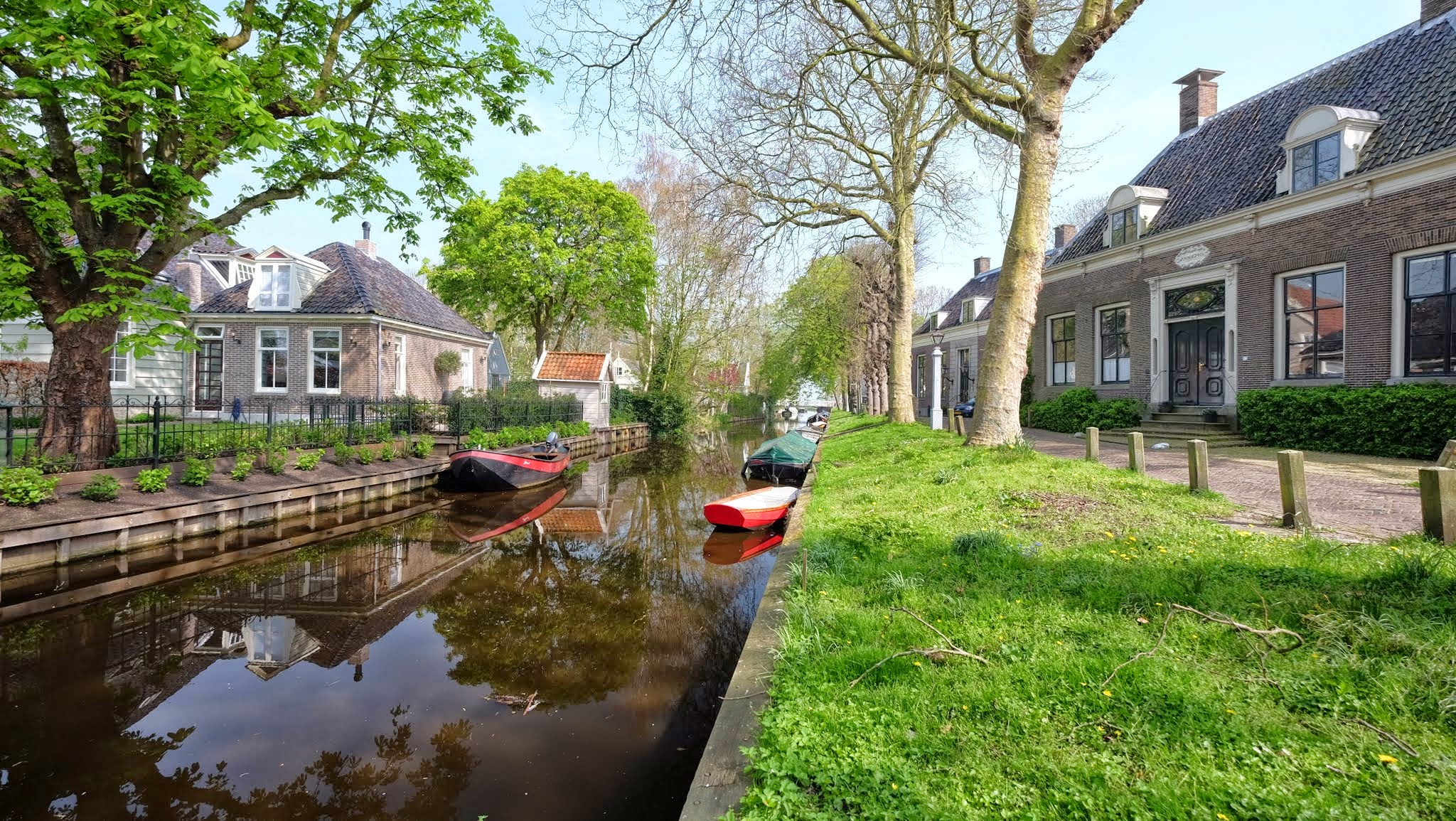

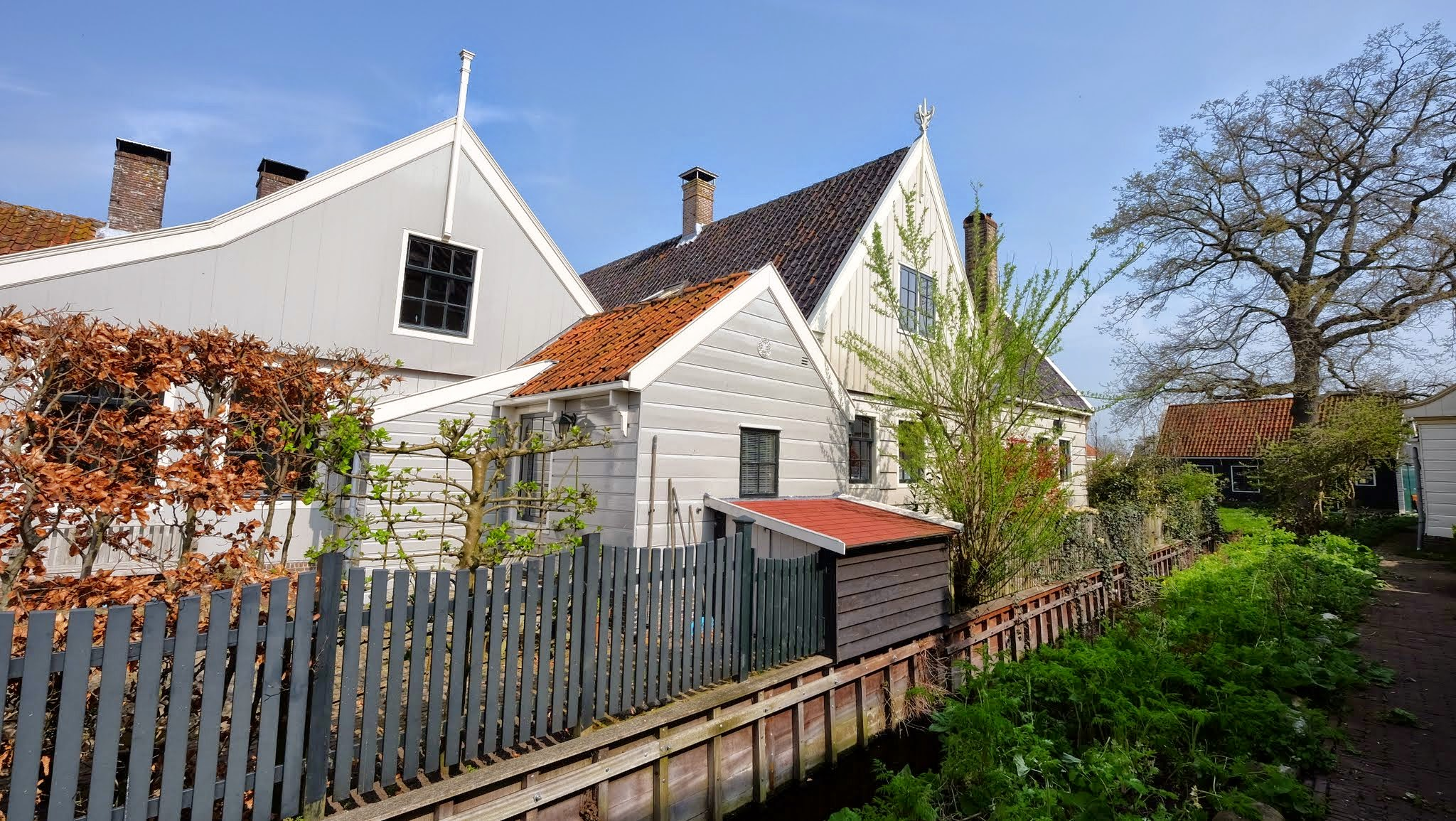

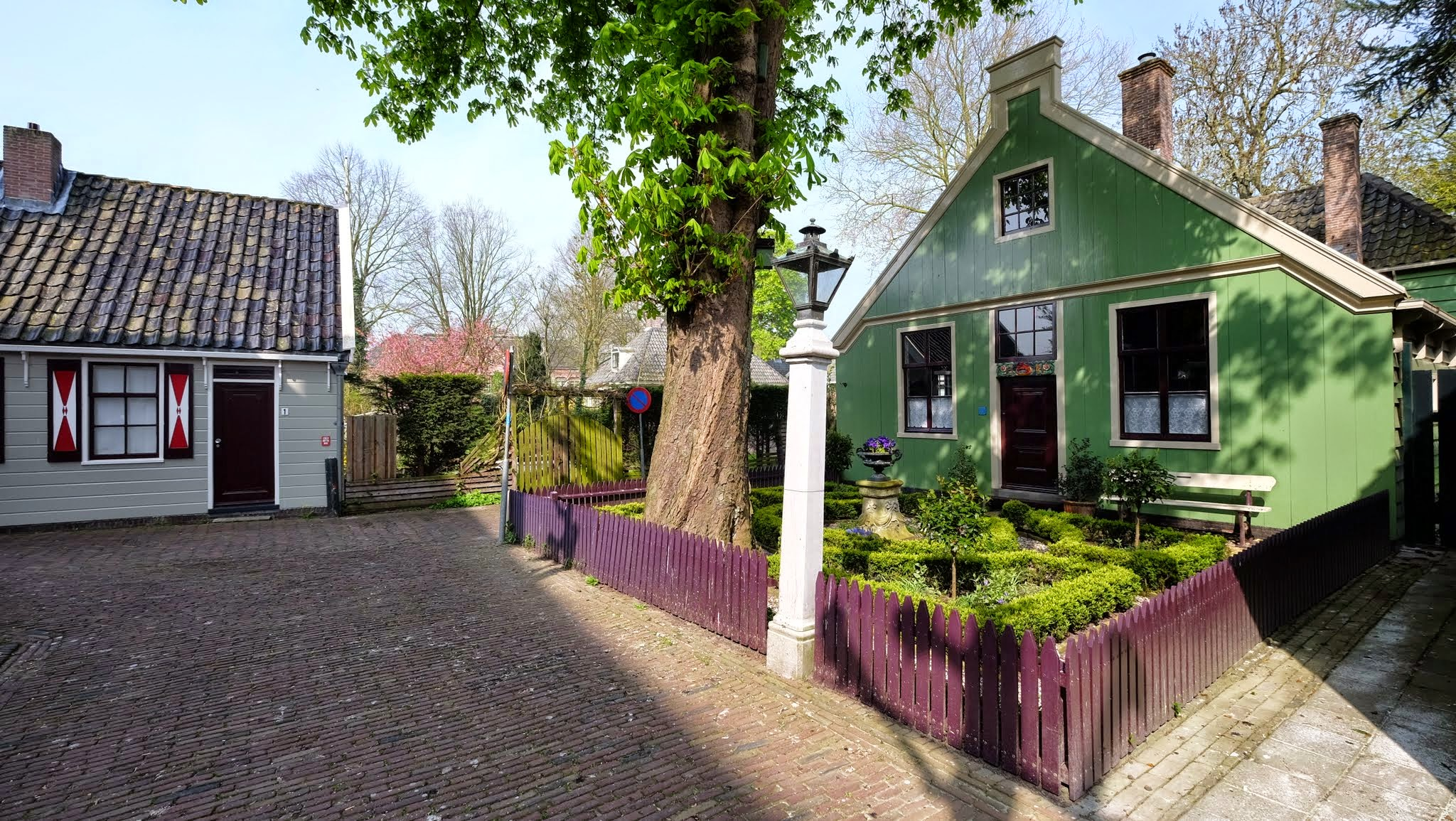
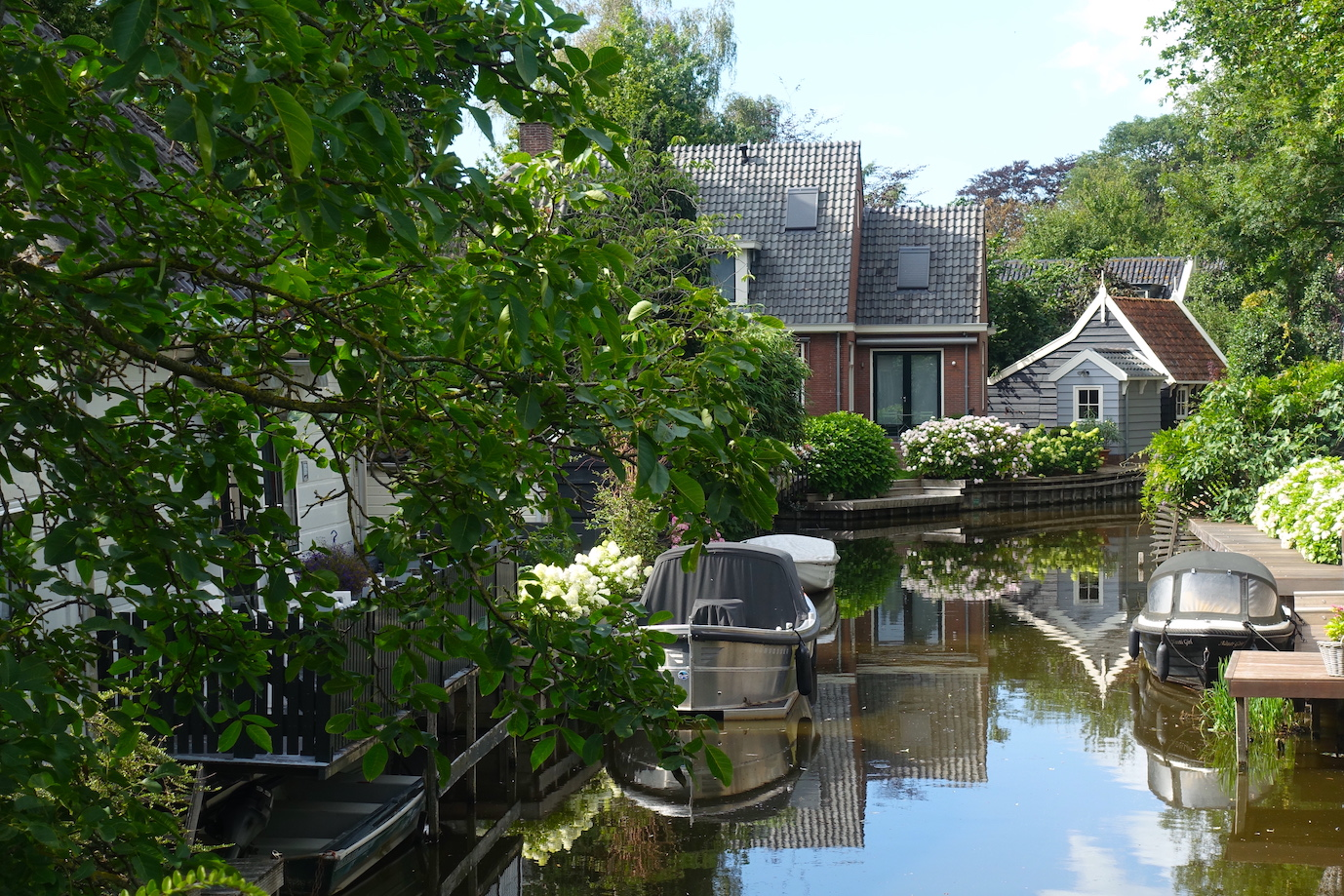

== See also ==
- Media related to Broek in Waterland at Wikimedia Commons
- Broek in Waterland travel guide from Wikivoyage
