= Gerard III van Heemskerk =

- Lord of Heemskerk
- Coat of arms of Heemskerk
- Predecessor: Gerard II van Heemskerk
- Successor: Wouter van Heemskerk
- Born: 1300
- Died: 1358 (aged 57–58)

Gerard (III) van Heemskerk, Lord of Heemskerk was a leader of the Cod Alliance during the opening phases of the Hook and Cod wars.

== Life ==
=== Family ===
Gerard's father Gerard II was born about 1260 and died in 1332 or 1333. He was probably married three times. His first wife was Ada, deceased in January 1308. His second wife Elizabeth van Heukelom made her last will in 1311. He is supposed to have married Beatrix van Haerlem Willemsdaughter before 1317, she died in 1326.

Gerard III was born from Gerard II and Ada in about 1300. His sister Domicella de Bloemen was probably also from Ada. The main line of the Heemskerk succession is based on the Necrologium of Egmond, and is as follows: Arnoud fathers Gerard II and Sir Hendrik, Gerard II fathers Gerard III and Domicella de Bloemen. Gerard III fathers Sir Wouter van Heemskerk, who dies without legal offspring.

According to the Dutch naming conventions, first sons were named for the paternal grandfather, second sons for the maternal grandfather. If Gerard III had been the oldest son of Gerard II, he would therefore have been named Arnoud. Gerard fits the pattern of being named for the maternal grandfather, i.e. Gerard van Egmond father of Ada.

=== Marriage of a Gerard van Heemskerk to Beatrix van Heemskerk ===
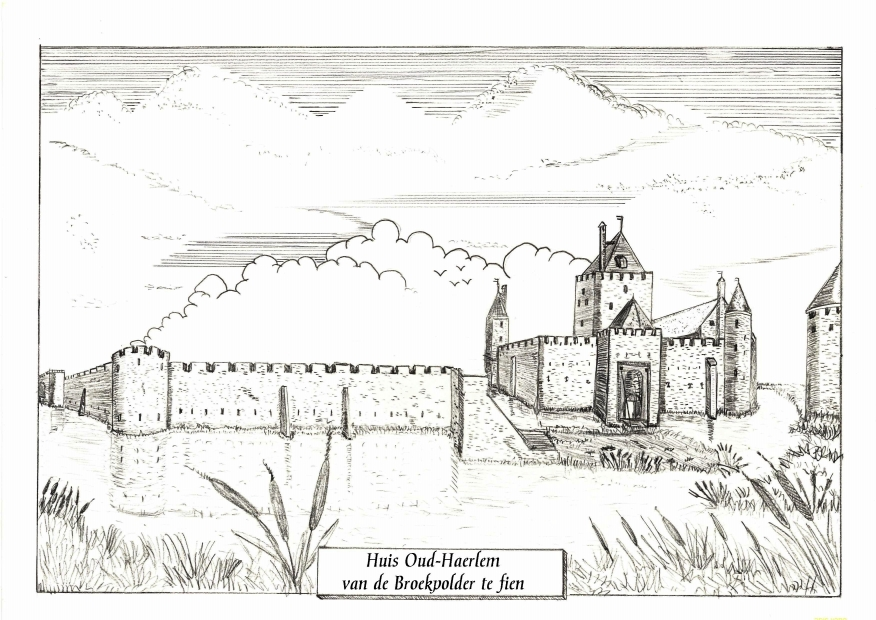
Oud Haerlem Castle

Regt states that Gerard III's brother Hendrik and his brother Willem van Haerlem alias van Heemskerk were from Gerard II's third marriage with Beatrix van Haerlem. Beatrix van Haerlem was a daughter of Willem van Haerlem, owner of Oud Haerlem Castle. Another daughter of Willem van Haerlem, Jutte, had married Jan van Bergen, who got the castle via her. She had first married Jan Mulaert, a relative of the Van Borselen family from Veere and Sandenburg Castle. After she was widowed, she was mentioned as the wife of 'a' Gerard van Heemskerk in 1313, in 1317, and 1320, and was mentioned in 1322.

Craandijk states that Beatrix married Gerard II, widower of Ada, and got Willem van Haerlem and Hendrik. He has Gerard II's death in 1332. Muller stated that Beatrix married Gerard III, and got Wouter and Hendrik. He stated that Gerard II died before 1317. Koenen was not that sure about the husband of Beatrix. He opted for Gerard III, but harbored two doubts: Gerard II fathering two sons at his (unknown) advanced age, and the problem that Gerard III's wife would not have left a trace in such case.

Whether Beatrix was married to Gerard II or Gerard III is not that relevant. The idea behind the marriage was probably that Oud Haerlem would remain in the family via the female line, i.e. would come to the children of Jutte or Beatrix. This was not to be. Like dozens of other fiefs, the Count of Holland first held Oud Haerlem for himself, and then granted it to one of the members of the Polanen / Duvenvoorde clan. In December 1328 it was granted to John I, Lord of Polanen.

=== Residence and estate ===
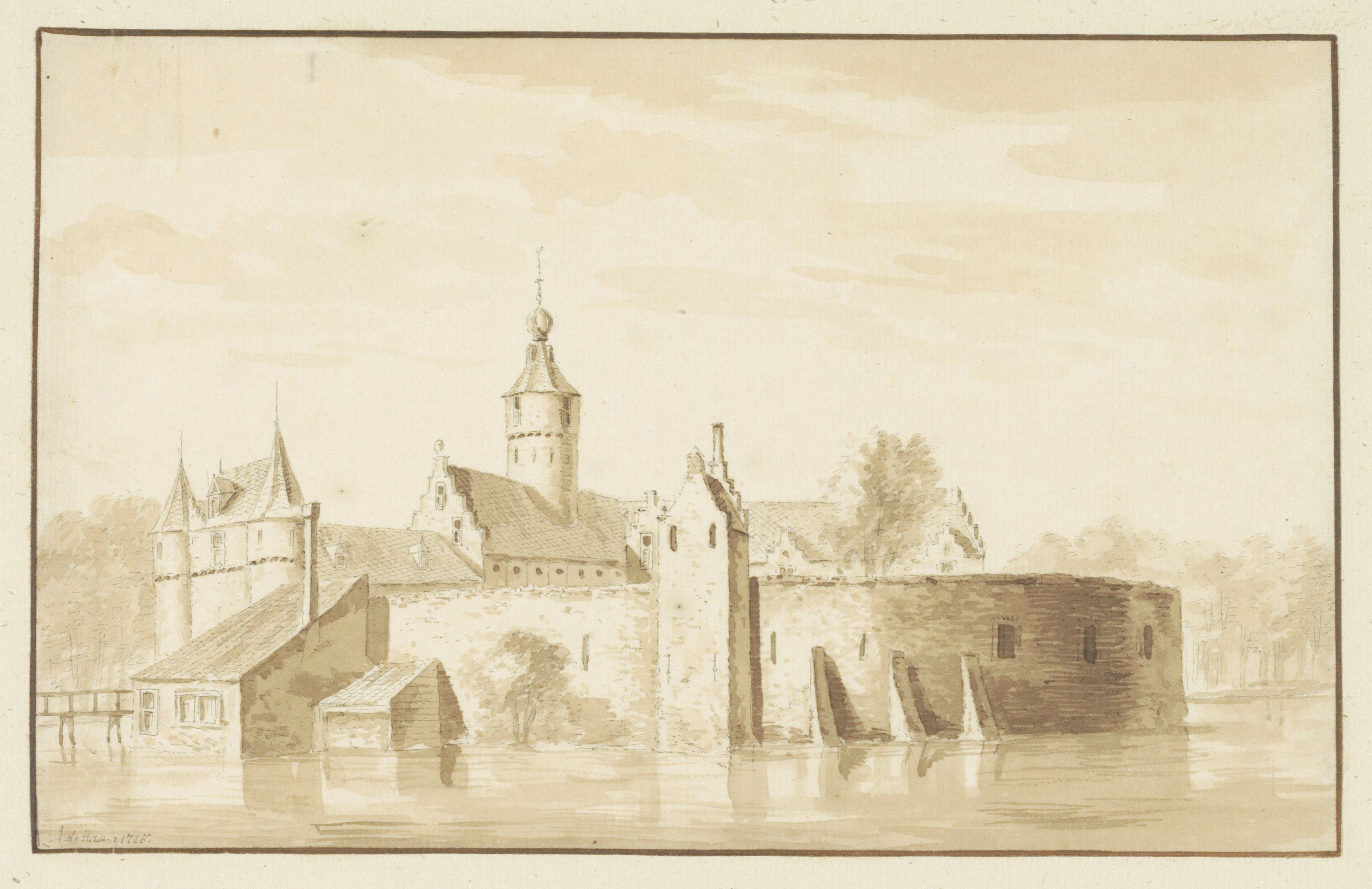
Marquette Castle

In January 1300 Gerard III's father Gerard II van Heemskerk had transferred his allodial Heemskerk Castle (currently known as Marquette Castle) to John II, Count of Holland, and had it granted back to him as a fief inheritable by sons, daughters and even sideways. So Heemskerk Castle was the core of Gerard III's domain. Gerard III also became lord of Oosthuizen. The Ambachtsheerlijkheid Oosthuizen consisted of Oosthuizen, South-Schardam, Etersheim, Hobrede, and the hamlet Verloreneinde.

What was not included in 1300 was the Heerlijkheid (Lordship) Heemskerk. This belonged to the Lords of Oud Haerlem Castle, which was just as far from Heemskerk village as Heemskerk Castle, and was even known by the same name (Heemskerk Castle) for a while.

In 1254 an Arnoud van Heemskerk was bailiff of Kennemerland and burgrave of Torenburg, a castle near Alkmaar. It led some to doubt the existence of Marquette Castle in medieval times, but the existence of a sizable medieval castle at Marquette, is so clear that the confusion cannot be solved this way.

=== Career ===
In 1338 Gerard III was mentioned as a knight, and as bailiff of Amstelland. In 1339 he was mentioned as bailiff and rentmeester (land agent) of Amstelland and Waterland. In 1346 and 1347 he was bailiff of Rijnland.

The opening phases of the Hook and Cod wars would become Gerard's finest hour. Already in 1350 he allied with the later Cod leadership, and in mid 1351 he was the fourth signatory of the Cod Alliance Treaty. In late 1351 Gerard was part of the diplomatic mission to get the hand of Maud of Lancaster for Count William V of Holland. Gerard would hold Dirk III van Brederode prisoner in 1354.

Gerard died in 1358.

== Offspring ==
Gerard was succeeded by his son Wouter van Heemskerk (c. 1330 - 1380).
