= Zeevang =

- Former municipality
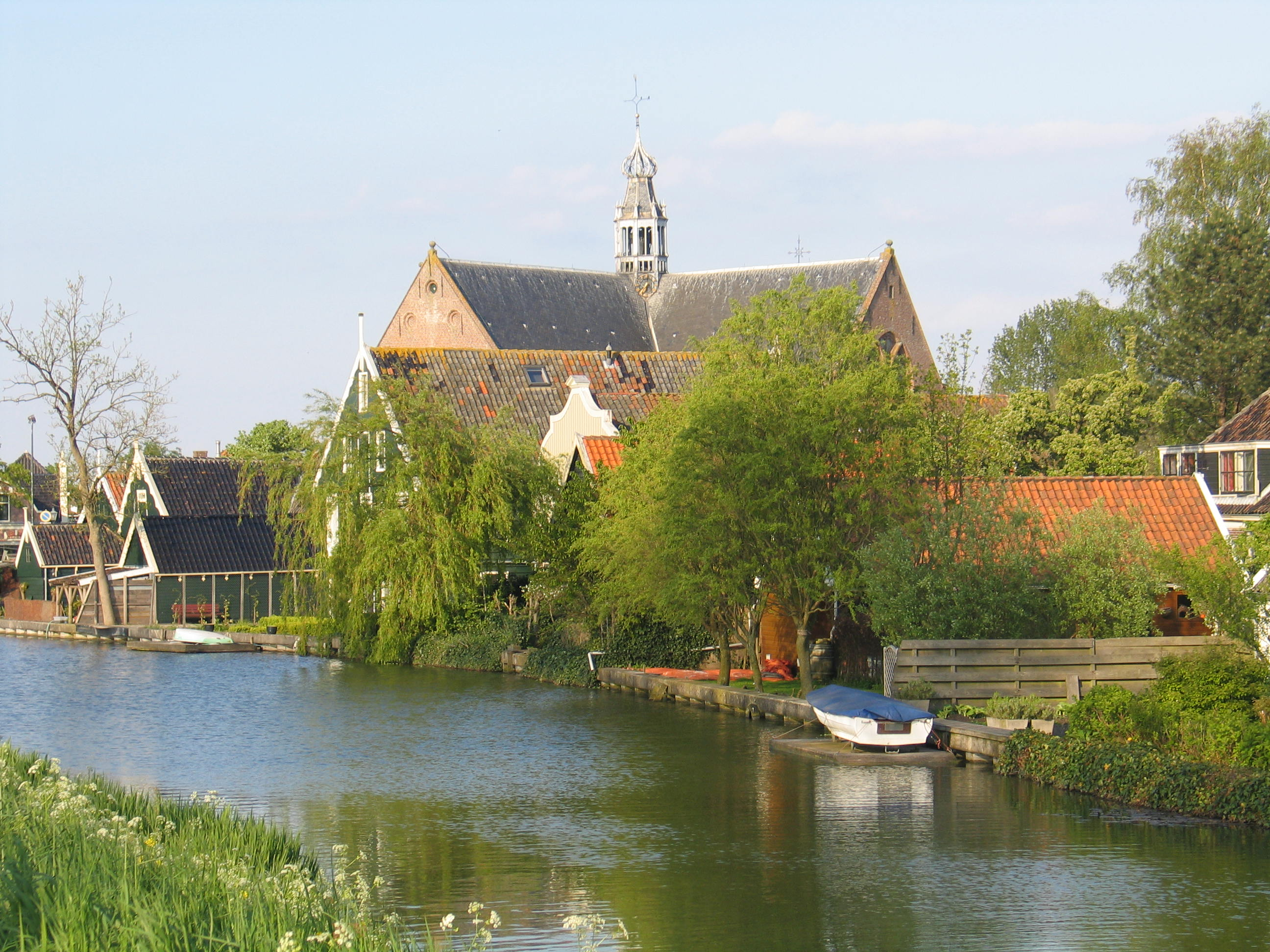
- Church in Oosthuizen

- Flag Coat of arms

- Location in North Holland
- Coordinates: 52°34′N 5°0′E
- Country: Netherlands
- Province: North Holland
- Municipality: Edam-Volendam
- Established: 1970 (distablished in 2016)

Area
  - Total: 55.21 km^{2} (21.32 sq mi)
  - Land: 38.06 km^{2} (14.70 sq mi)
  - Water: 17.15 km^{2} (6.62 sq mi)
- Elevation: −1 m (−3.3 ft)

Population (January 2021)
  - Total: data missing
- Time zone: UTC+1 (CET)
  - Summer (DST): UTC+2 (CEST)
- Postcode: 1470–1477
- Area code: 0299
- Website: www.zeevang.nl

Zeevang (Dutch pronunciation: [ˈzeːvɑŋ]) is a former municipality in northwestern Netherlands, in the province of North Holland. Since January 2016, Zeevang has been part of the municipality of Edam-Volendam.

== Population centres ==
The former municipality of Zeevang contained the following small towns and villages: Beets, Etersheim, Hobrede, Kwadijk, Middelie, Oosthuizen, Schardam, Warder.

== Local government ==
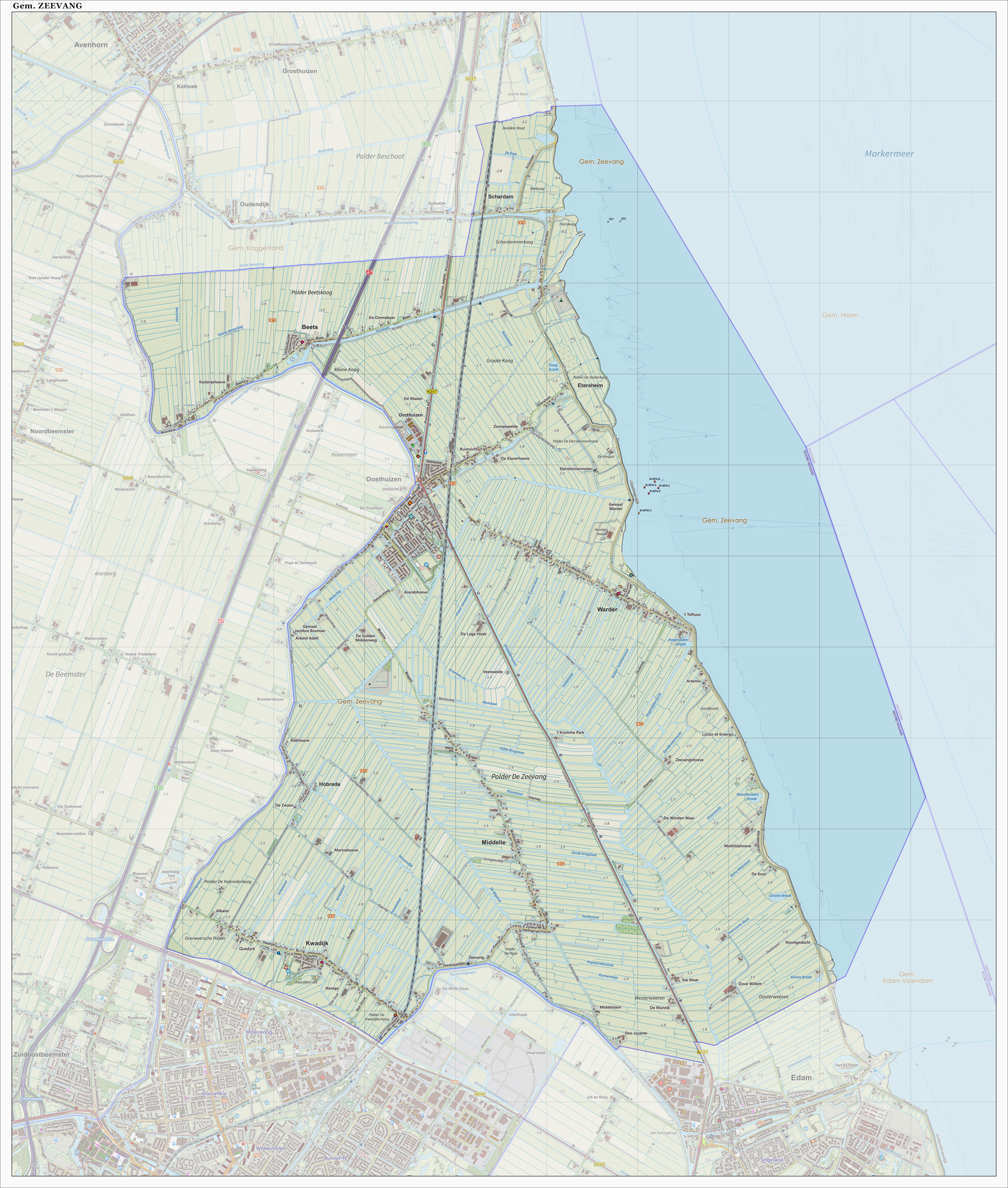
Map of the former municipality of Zeevang, September 2014

The municipal council of Zeevang consisted of 13 seats, which at the 2014 elections were divided as follows:

- Zeevangs Belang - 7 seats
- VVD - 3 seats
- PvdA - 2 seats
- CDA - 1 seat

An election was held in November 2015 for a council for the new merged Edam-Volendam municipality that commenced work on 1 January 2016, replacing Zeevang council.
