= Verkolje =

Verkolje is a surname, and notable people with the surname include:

- Jan Verkolje (1650–1693), Dutch painter
- Nicolaas Verkolje (1673–1746), Dutch painter
