= Adriaan de Bruin =

African-born Dutch enslaved servant

Tabo Jansz
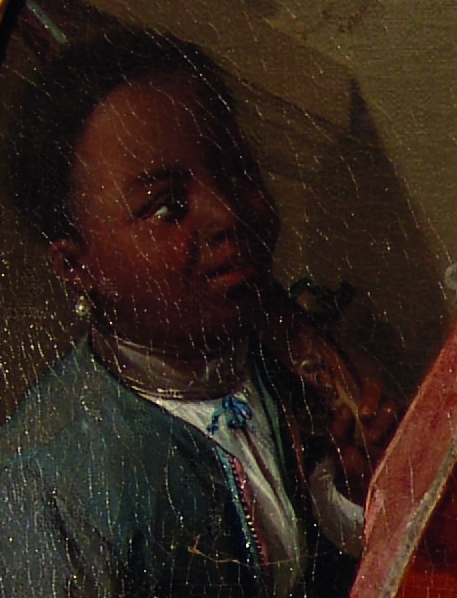
- Born: c. 1700; Africa
- Died: 1766; Oosthuizen, Netherlands

Adriaan de Bruin (c. 1700 – 1766), earlier called Tabo Jansz, was an enslaved servant (kammermohr) of Dutch politician Adriaan van Bredehoff. Born in Africa and enslaved, he got to the Dutch Republic by way of either the Dutch Caribbean or in Dutch Surinam, and ended up a free man in Hoorn, North Holland. De Bruin and van Bredehoff stood for a portrait (1727) by Nicolaas Verkolje, now in the Westfries Museum in Hoorn.

== Biography ==
Little is known of de Bruin's life before adulthood. Originally kidnapped from Africa and enslaved, he had been brought to the Dutch Republic from either Dutch Suriname or the Dutch Antilles, and became a "servant" to Adriaan van Bredehoff, a politician who had a house in Oosthuizen and was schout of Hoorn. A harbour town in North Holland, Hoorn was the seat of the Dutch West India Company (WIC), which (in its second incarnation) had begun to focus on the transatlantic slave trade. Van Bredehoff was at one point a director of the WIC. Slavery was illegal in the Dutch Republic itself and so nominally de Bruin was a servant, though practically speaking his freedom must have been very limited. There were not many people of color in the Netherlands before the mid-nineteenth century, and most of them lived in the larger cities, especially Amsterdam. In West Friesland, where Hoorn is one of the major cities, there were two people of colour—de Bruin and a man named Cornelis Valentijn, who had come from the Dutch East Indies.

Apparently de Bruin and van Bredehoff were on good terms, and when the latter died in 1733 he left a considerable inheritance to de Bruin (who inherited more than the white maid), consisting of 12,000 guilders in bonds. Two months after van Bredehoff's death, Tabo Jansz was baptized in the Dutch Reformed Church, and this was the first documented instance of the name Adriaan de Bruin—the first name for his "master", the last name for his skin color (the register lists him as "from West India"). The inheritance, van Bredehoff noted, was to set de Bruin up in business and prevent him from "falling back into heathendom". However, he was only allowed the annual interest, and the funds were governed by two administrators, who were to receive the funds should de Bruin die without children. De Bruin had married a local girl, Welmetje Bakkers, and started a tobacco shop in Hoorn. In 1753 he asked for a sum of 1,000 guilders to repay debts incurred for work on his shop. The two administrators refused, and de Bruin ended up asking the local government to force the administrators' hands and sell some of the bonds. They grudgingly agreed but reprimanded him, and appointed a third administrator, François van Bredehoff, the son of Adriaan van Bredehoff. Dutch historian Jan de Bruin commented, "For Adriaan this must have been a humiliating experience. He was no longer a slave, but he would never really be a free man". He died in 1766, childless.

== Portrait ==
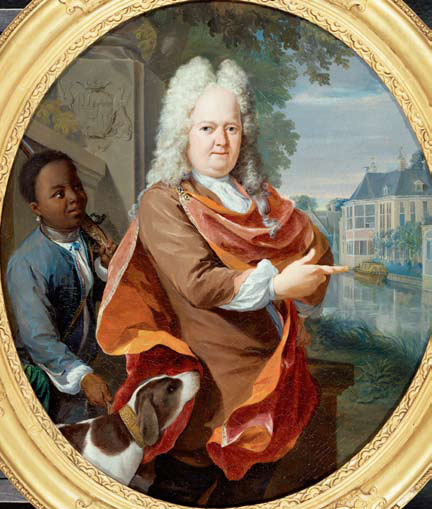
Painting of Adriaan van Bredehoff (1672–1733) and Tabo Jansz. In the background is the house of the family Van Bredehoff in Oosthuizen.

In 1727, painter Nicolaas Verkolje (1673–1746) made a portrait of van Bredehoff and (young) de Bruin. It is held in the Westfries Museum, where local lore held that he may have been an ancestor of one of the employees of the Westfries Archief. Interest in the Dutch history of slavery grew before 2013, when the 150th anniversary of abolition was commemorated, and this led to researchers looking into the two West-Frisian (former) slaves, de Bruin and Cornelis Valentijn.

The portrait shows the two men standing on the dike of the Beemsterringvaart, with van Bredehoff pointing at his family home on the other side of the canal (it was built by his father after 1686, and demolished in 1863). Young de Bruin is holding a musket in one hand, and with the other restrains a dog with a leash.

== See also ==
- Gustav Badin
- Anton Wilhelm Amo
