= Schardam =

- Village
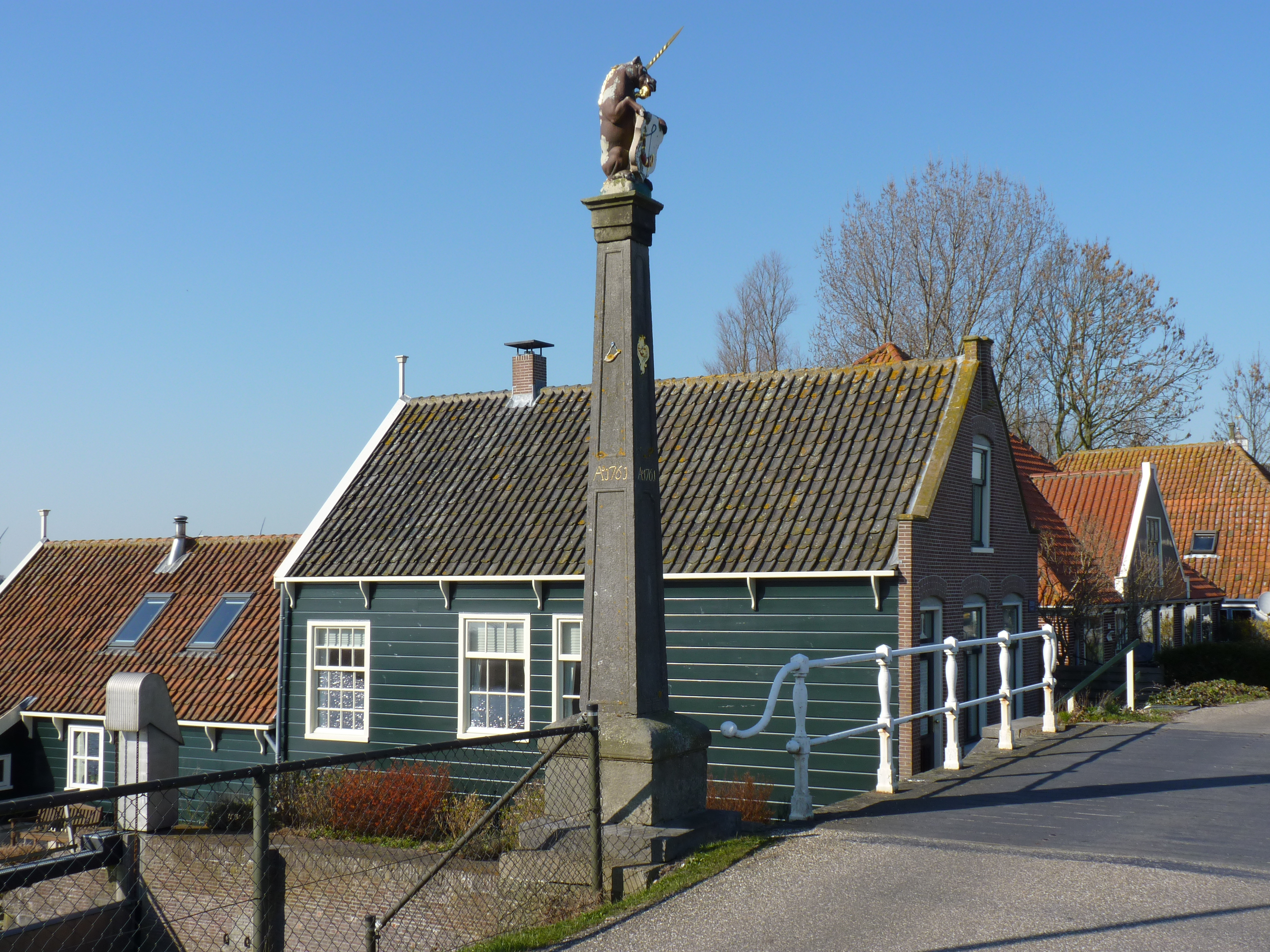

- Coat of arms

- Location in the Netherlands Location in the province of North Holland in the Netherlands
- Coordinates: 52°35′49″N 5°1′1″E
- Country: Netherlands
- Province: North Holland
- Municipality: Edam-Volendam

Area
  - Total: 2.68 km^{2} (1.03 sq mi)
- Elevation: 0.6 m (2.0 ft)

Population (2021)
  - Total: 120
  - Density: 45/km^{2} (120/sq mi)
- Time zone: UTC+1 (CET)
  - Summer (DST): UTC+2 (CEST)
- Postal code: 1476
- Dialing code: 0299 in the north, 0229 in the south

Schardam is a small village in the Dutch province of North Holland. It is a part of the municipality of Edam-Volendam, and lies about 6 kilometres (3.7 mi) southwest of Hoorn.

The village was first mentioned in 1319 as "den Scaderdam". The etymology is unclear. Schardam is a dike village which developed in the 14th century. There is a double exit sluice in Schardam. The southern sluice dates from 1592 and was renewed in 1738. The northern sluice 1712.

Schardam was home to 91 people in 1840. It was a separate municipality from 1817 to 1854, when it was merged with Beets. In 2016, it became part of the municipality of Edam-Volendam.

== Gallery ==
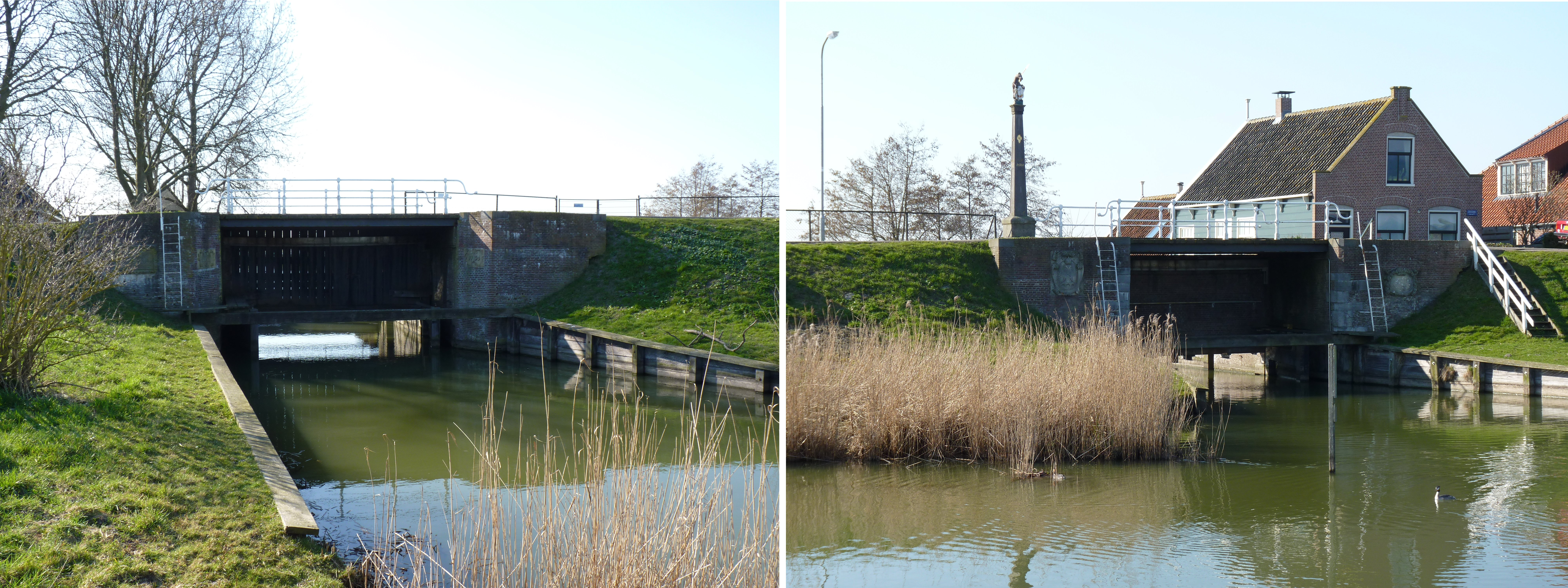
South and north canal locks at Schardam

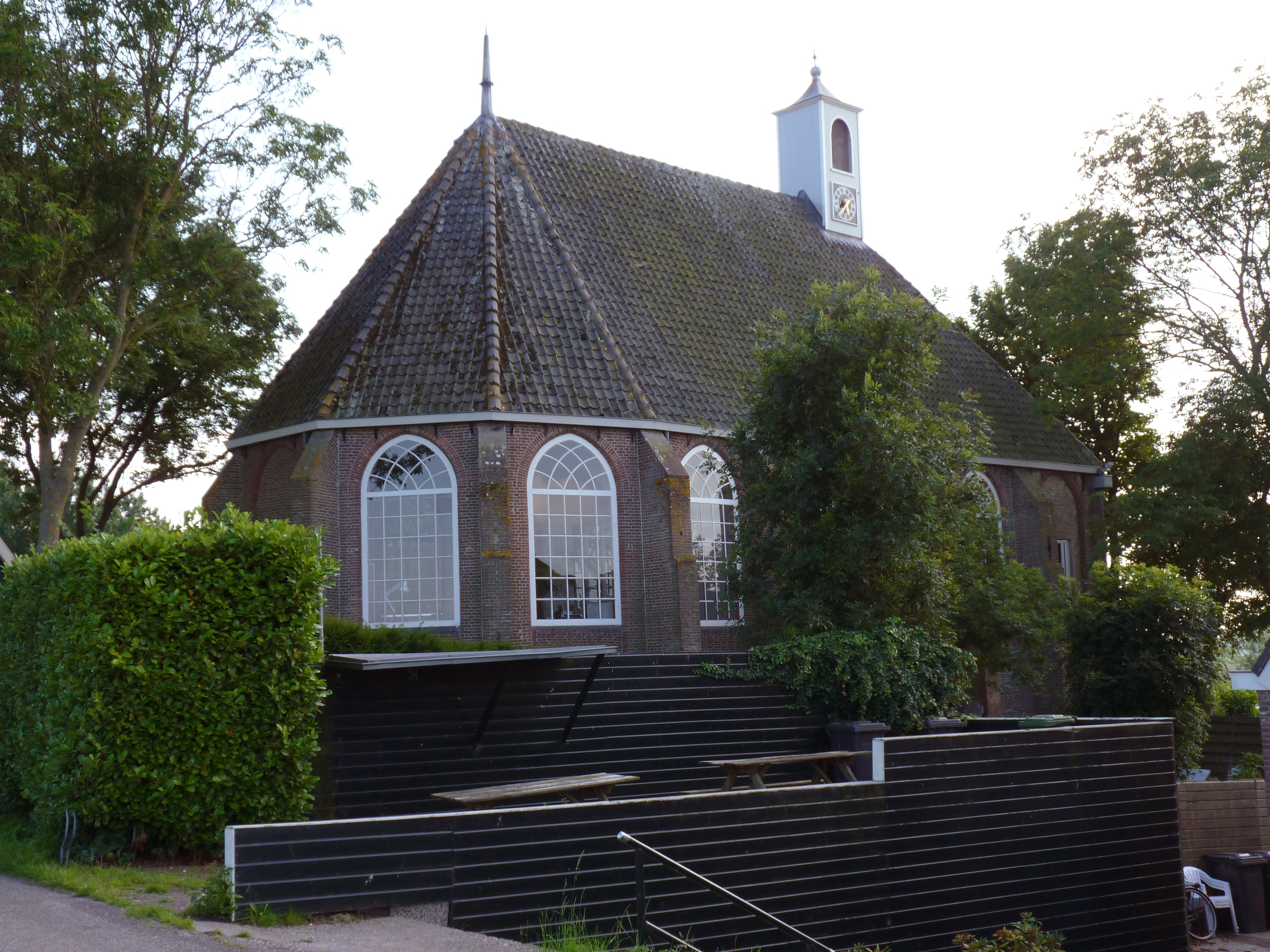
Church of Schardam

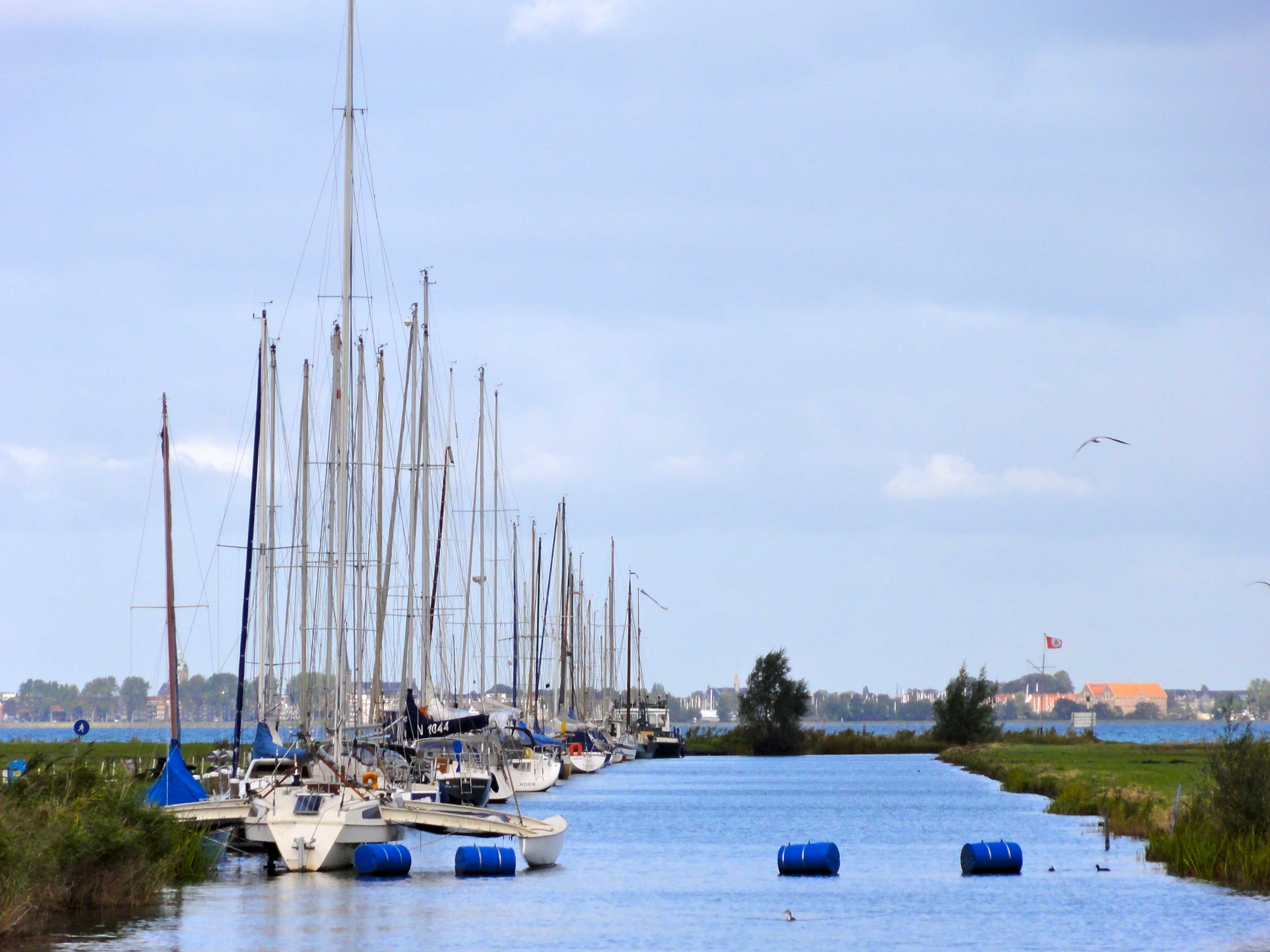
Marina of Schardam
