= Etersheim =

- Hamlet
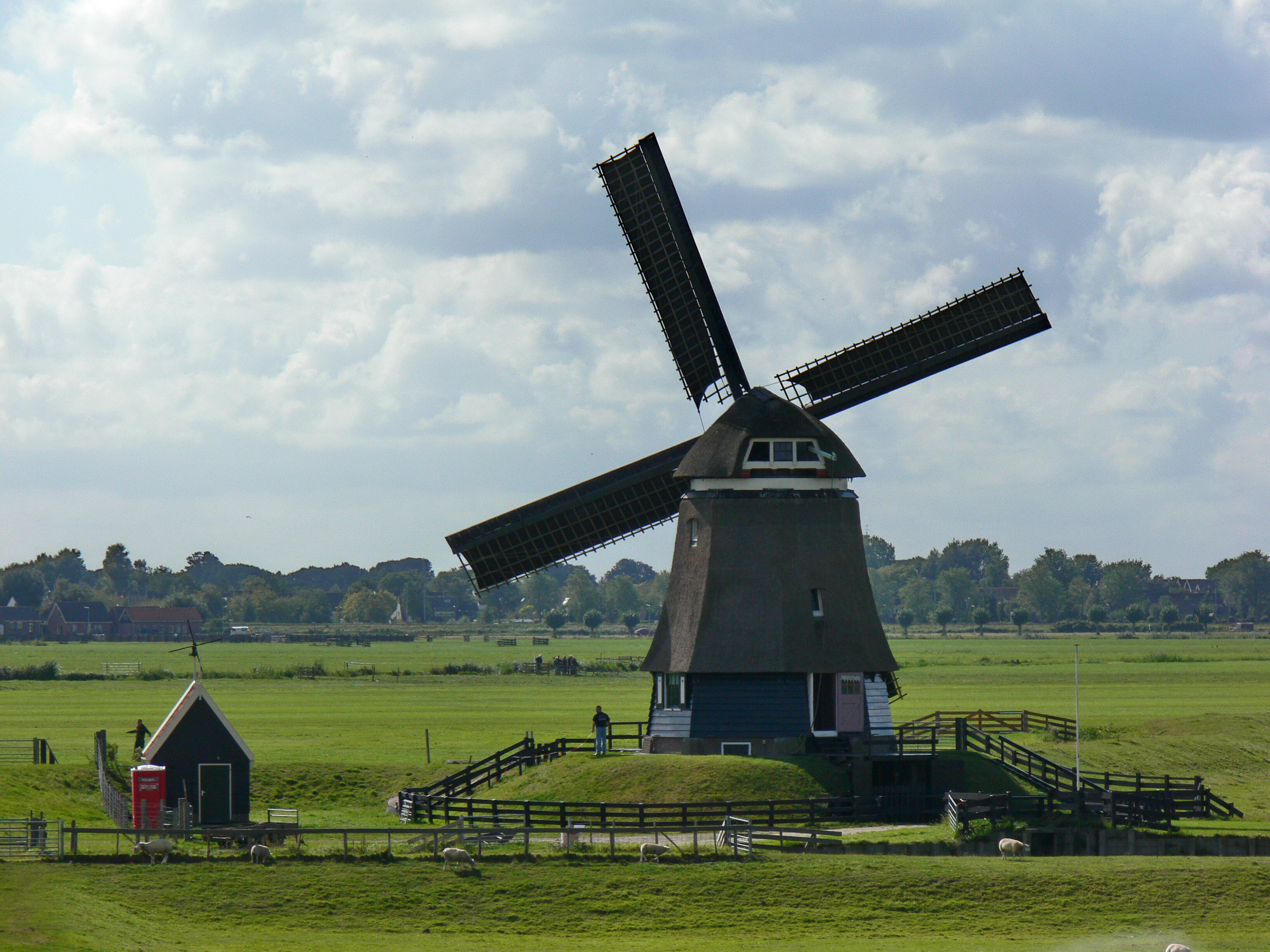

- Location in the Netherlands Location in the province of North Holland in the Netherlands
- Coordinates: 52°35′6″N 5°1′20″E
- Country: Netherlands
- Province: North Holland
- Municipality: Edam-Volendam
- Time zone: UTC+1 (CET)
  - Summer (DST): UTC+2 (CEST)
- Postal code: 1474
- Dialing code: 0299

Etersheim is a hamlet in the Dutch province of North Holland. It is a part of the municipality of Edam-Volendam, and lies about 2 kilometers northeast of Oosthuizen.

Etersheim was a separate municipality between 1817 and 1848, when it was merged with Oosthuizen.

Etersheim is not a statistical entity, and the postal authorities have placed it under Oosthuizen. Etersheim has place name signs. It was home to 45 people in 1840. Nowadays, it consists about 25 houses.

It was first mentioned in 1277 as Eitersem. The etymology is unclear. It used to be a village, but disappeared in the former Zuiderzee (nowadays: IJsselmeer). A new village was built within the dike.

The old village church from 1730 was demolished in 1901, and used to construct the new church. The church was in service until 1971. In 1975, it was bought by the Church of Satan and was in service for a couple of years. It is now a residential home. The tower was partially demolished in 1984, because it was unstable.

== Gallery ==
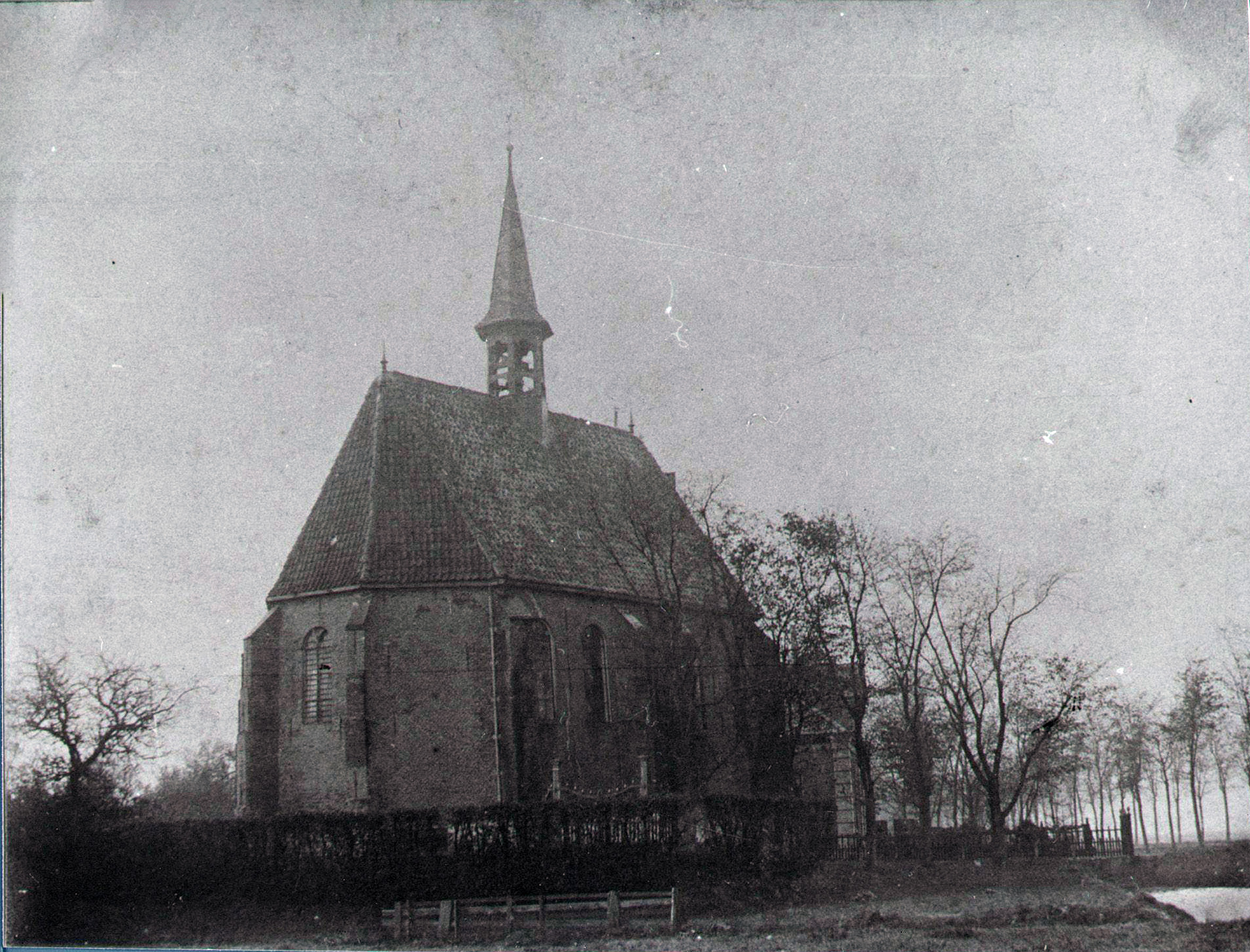
The Old Church of Etersheim (before 1900)

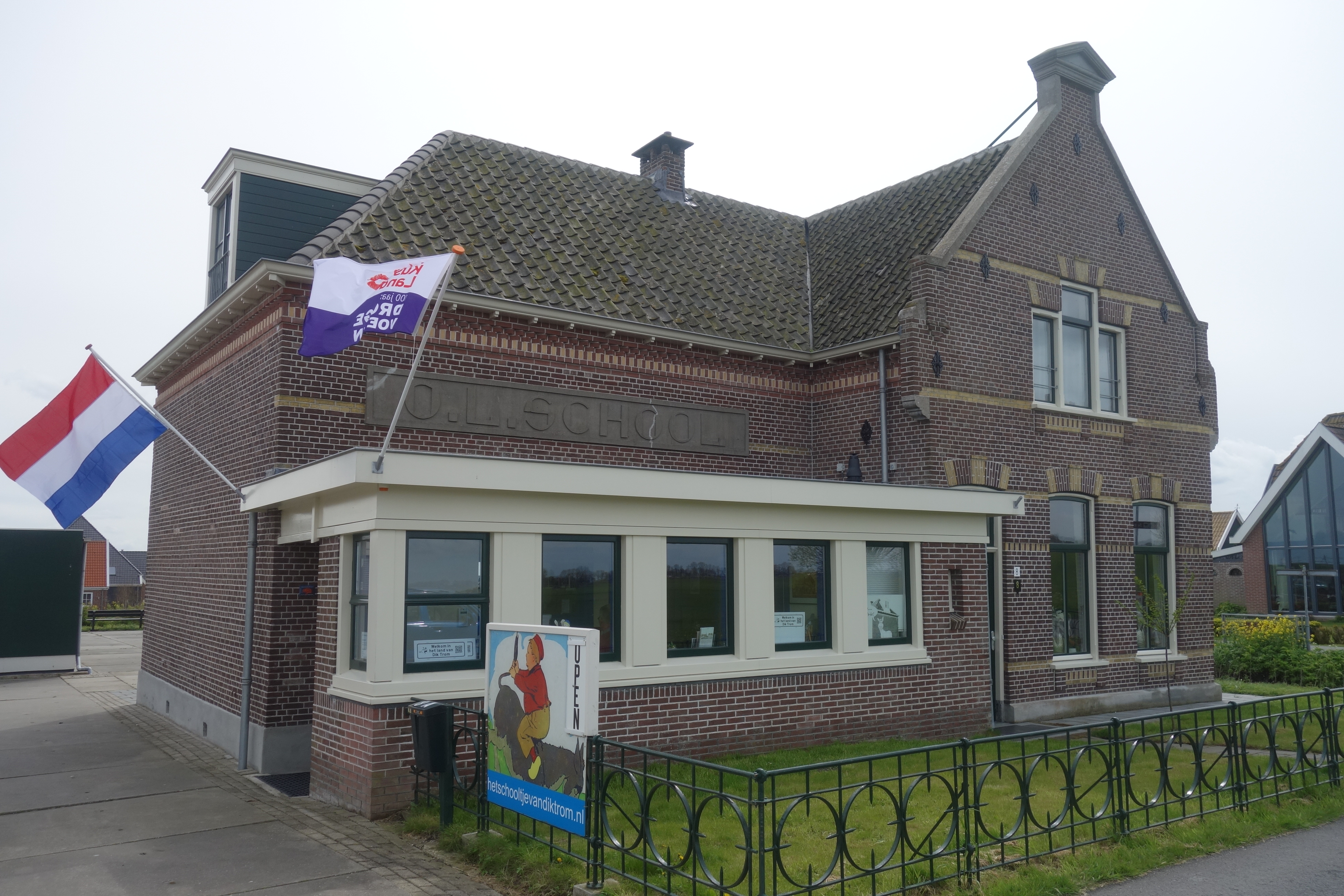
Dik Trom Museum

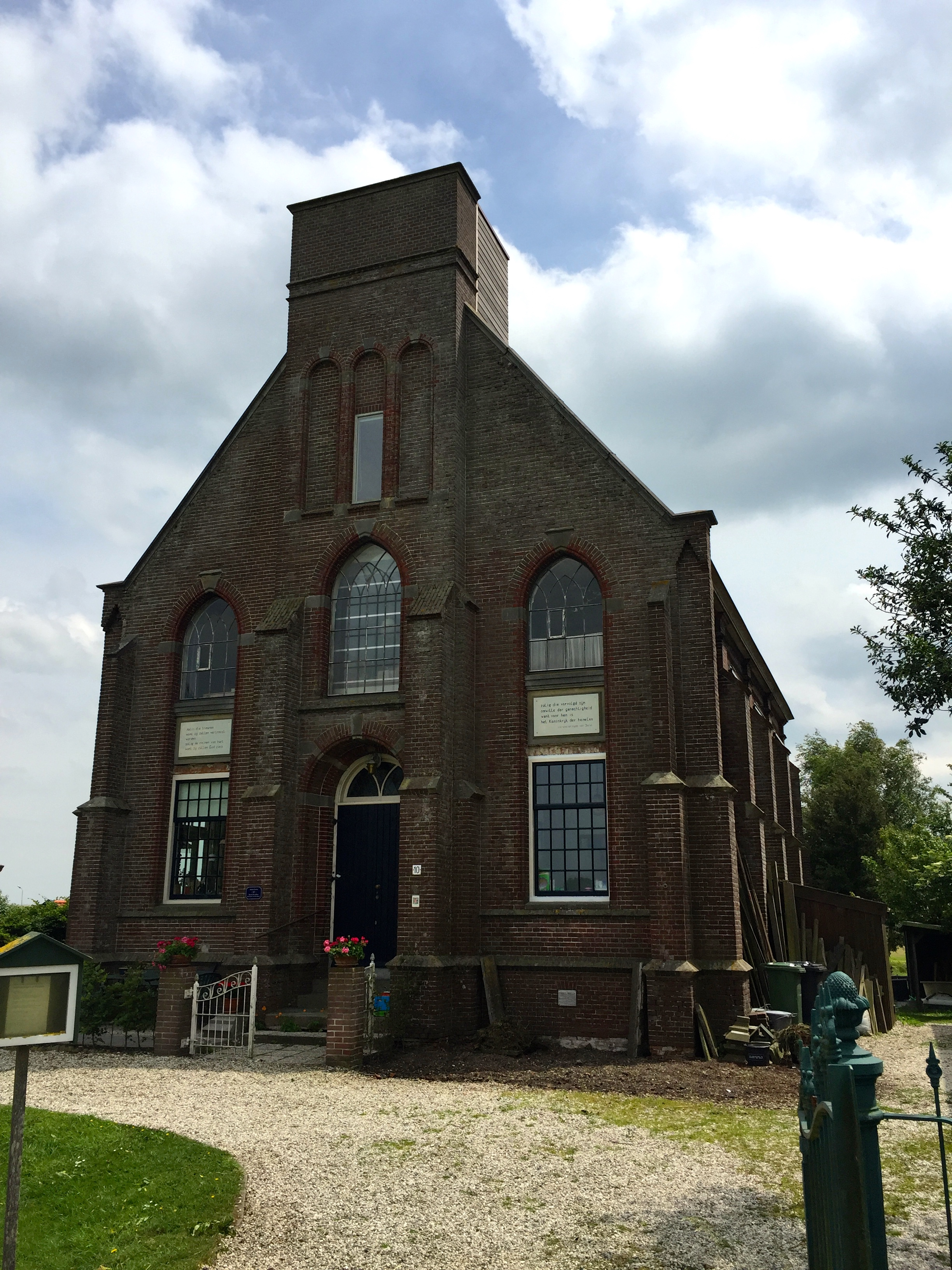
Current Church of Etersheim

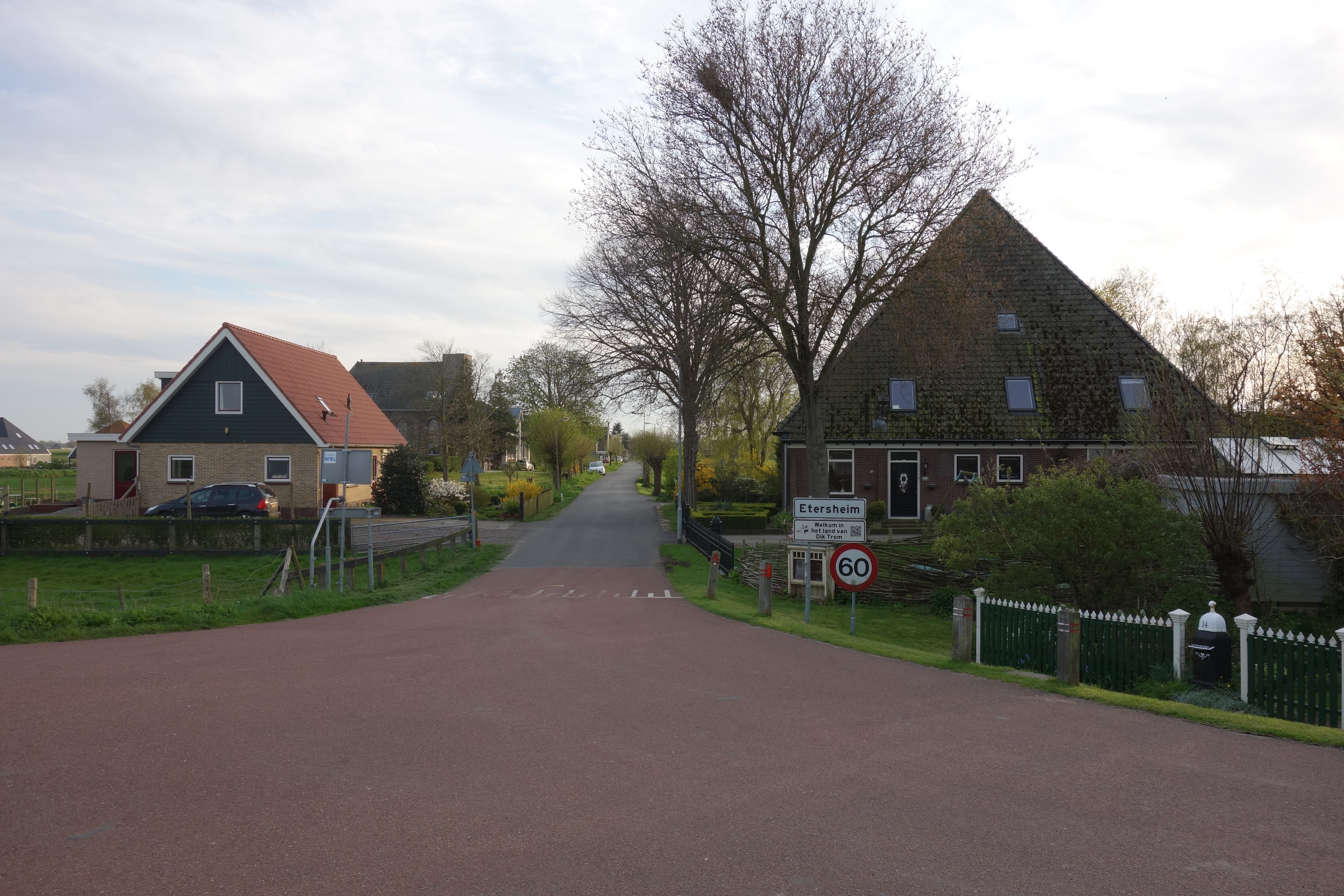
Street view
