= Nikolaas Verkolje =

Dutch painter

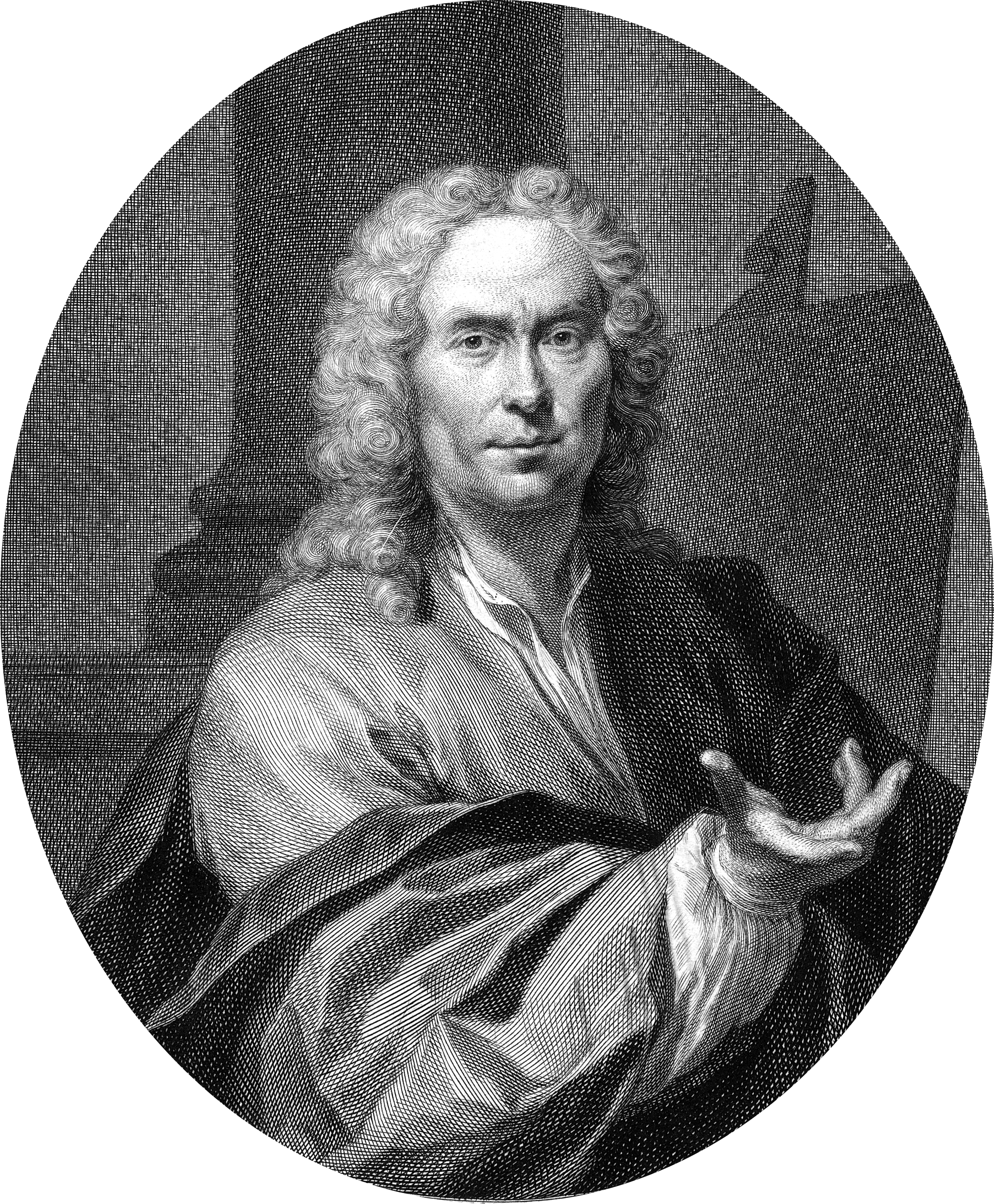
Portrait of Nicolaas Verkolje (Jacob Houbraken, ca. 1752)

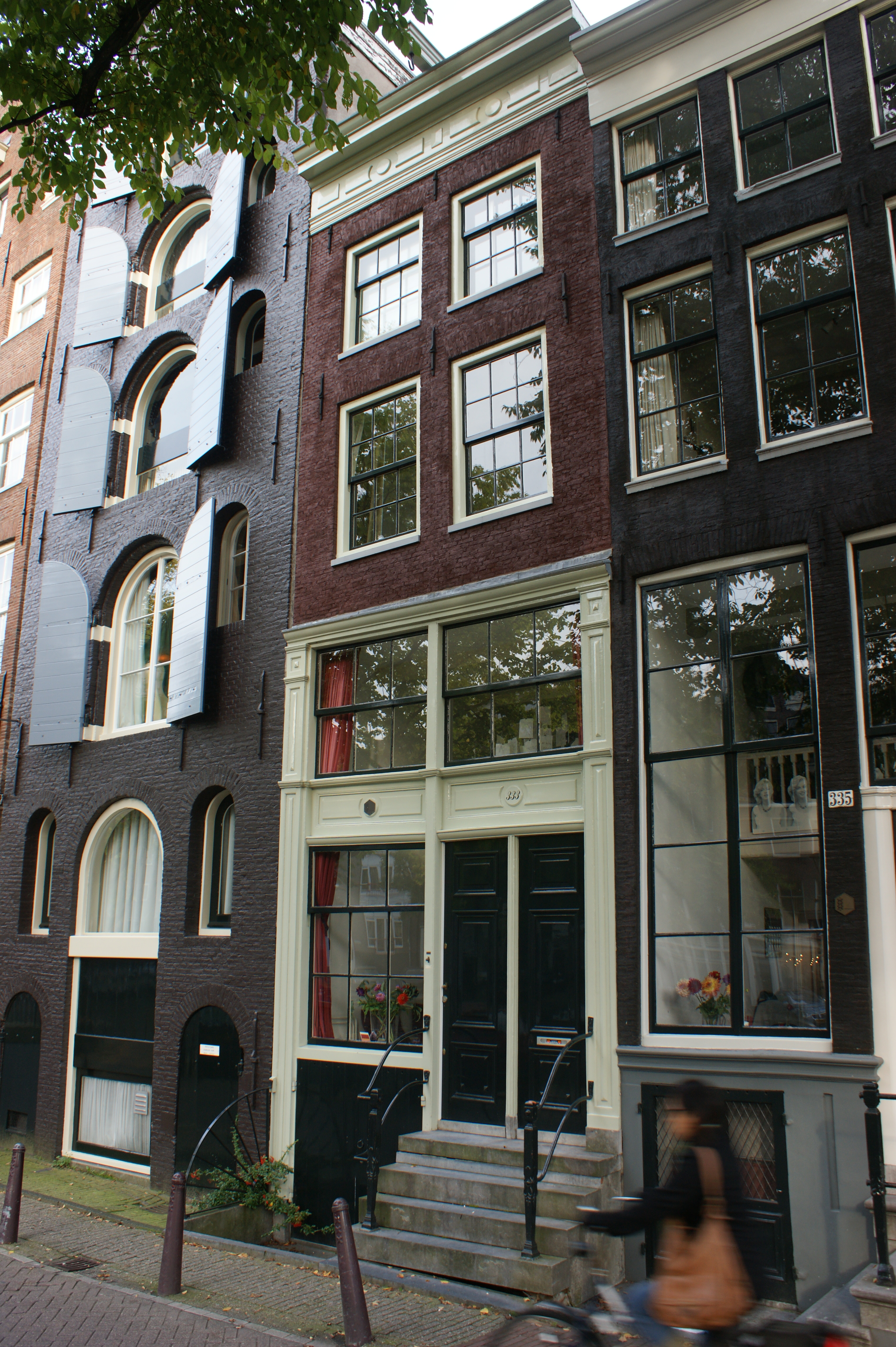
Amsterdam - Prinsengracht 333

Nicolaas Verkolje or Vercolje (11 April 1673 – 21 January 1746) was a Dutch painter and mezzotinter. He specialized in history pieces and portraits in a classicistic style.

== Biography ==
He was born in Delft as the son of Jan Verkolje. Arnold Houbraken erroneously described him as the only one of five children to carry on his father's art. Houbraken had intended to compose a biographical sketch of Nicolaas, yet he never reached that point, as he died before the publication of Volume III, which was written in order of birth year. According to the RKD both he and his brother Jan II became painters, having learned painting and engraving from their father. Nicolaes Verkolje was influenced by Antoine Coypel, Gérard de Lairesse, Godfried Schalcken, Gerard Dou, Adriaen van der Werff and Gabriel Metsu whose paintings he copied on commission. At the beginning of the 18th century, Verkolje merged these two developments by going back to biblical and mythological themes and dynamic compositions. His velvet touch, beautiful colour combinations and eye for detail make even the most dramatic stories accessible and easy on the eye for the viewer.

After 1700 he lived at Prinsengracht 333 with his wife and three children. Nicolaas became the teacher of Jan Matthias Kok, Jan Maurits Quinkhard, Arnout Rentinck and Gerrit Zegelaar. In 1722, Verkolje requested three persons to assist his wife Anna Maria Wulffingh with selling the artworks after his death, excluding those made by himself or his deceased father, to preserve them for his children. In 1727 he painted the black servant Adriaan de Bruin, living in Oosthuizen.

His sons Joan and Jacob went to the East-Indies and China. After Verkolje died in Amsterdam in 1746, his widow moved to Leiderdorp with her daughter Johanna Antonia. She seems to have been rather wealthy, invested in stocks and bonds, and was living at OZ Voorburgwal when she died in 1760.

== Works ==
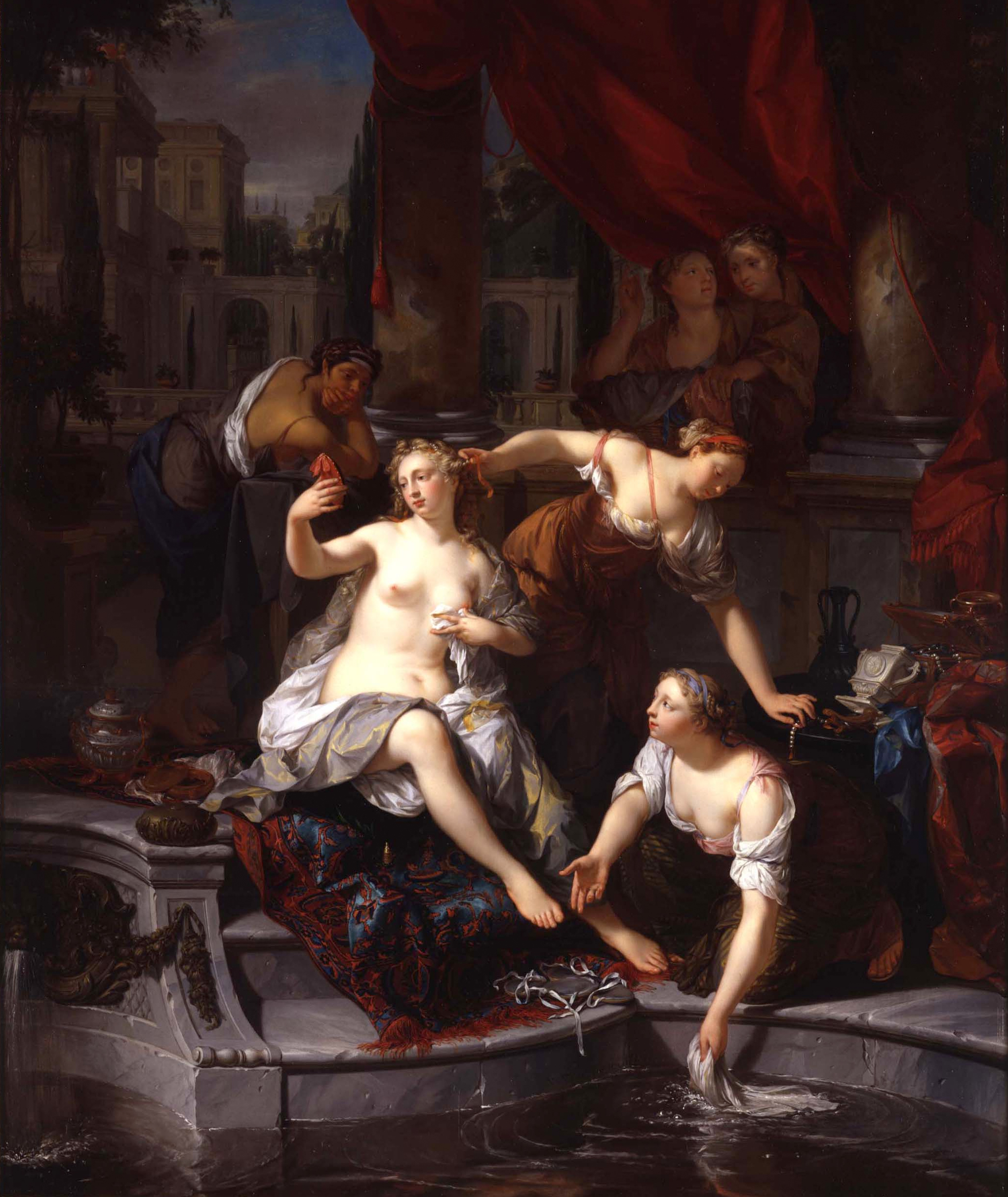
Bathsheba at Her Bath, 1716

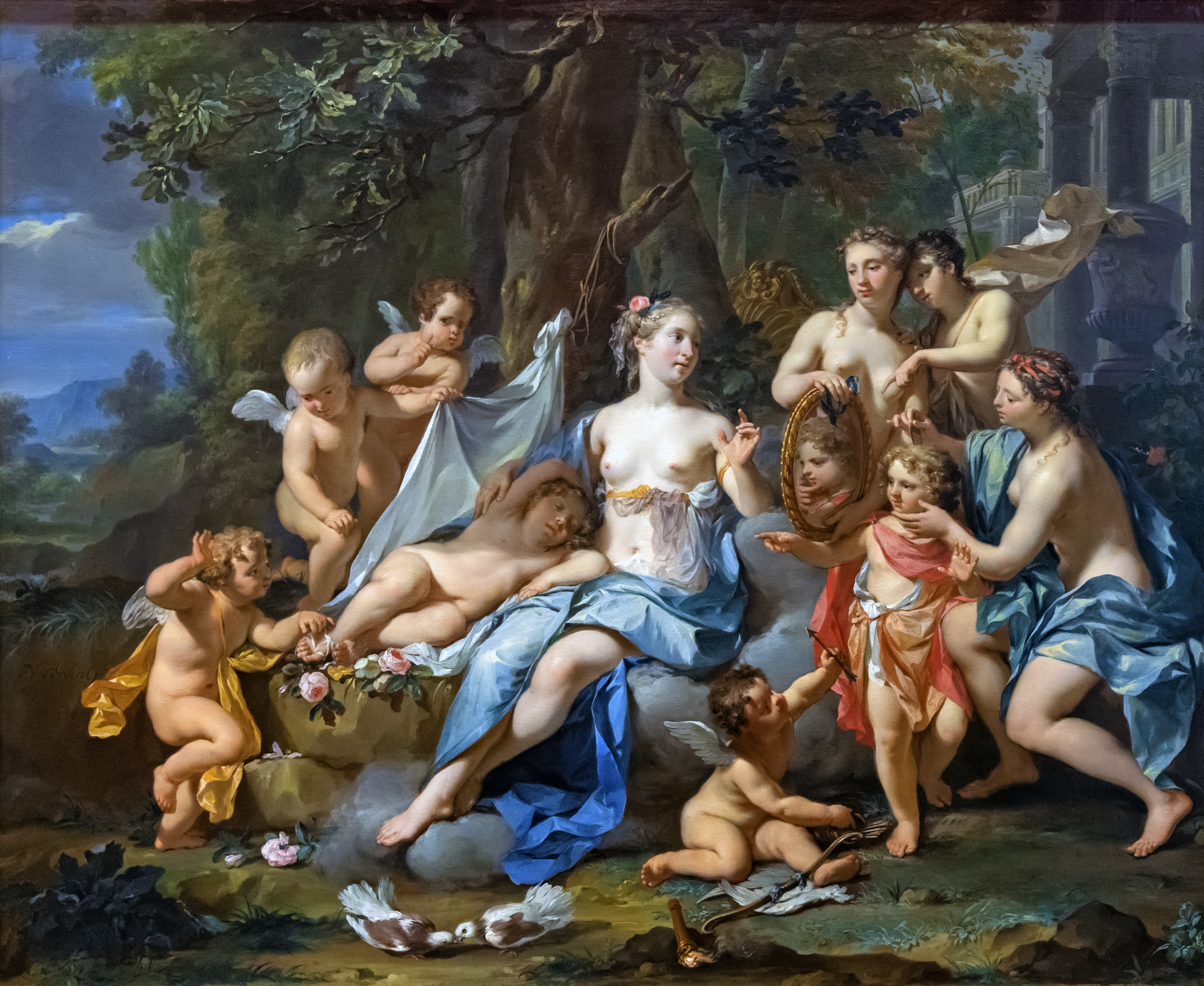
The love asleep near Venus, Musée des Beaux-Arts de Carcassonne

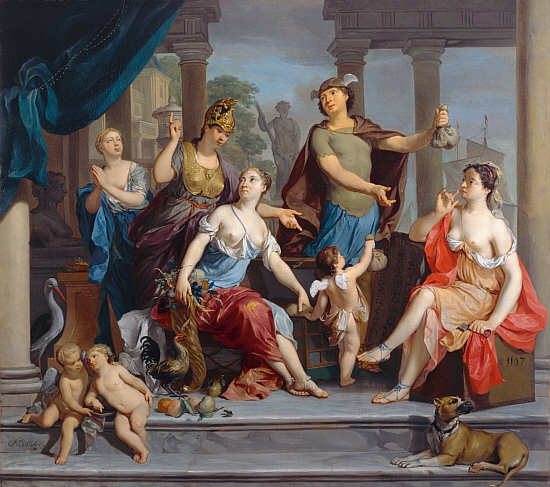
Allegorie vom Wohlstand und der Blüte Hollands

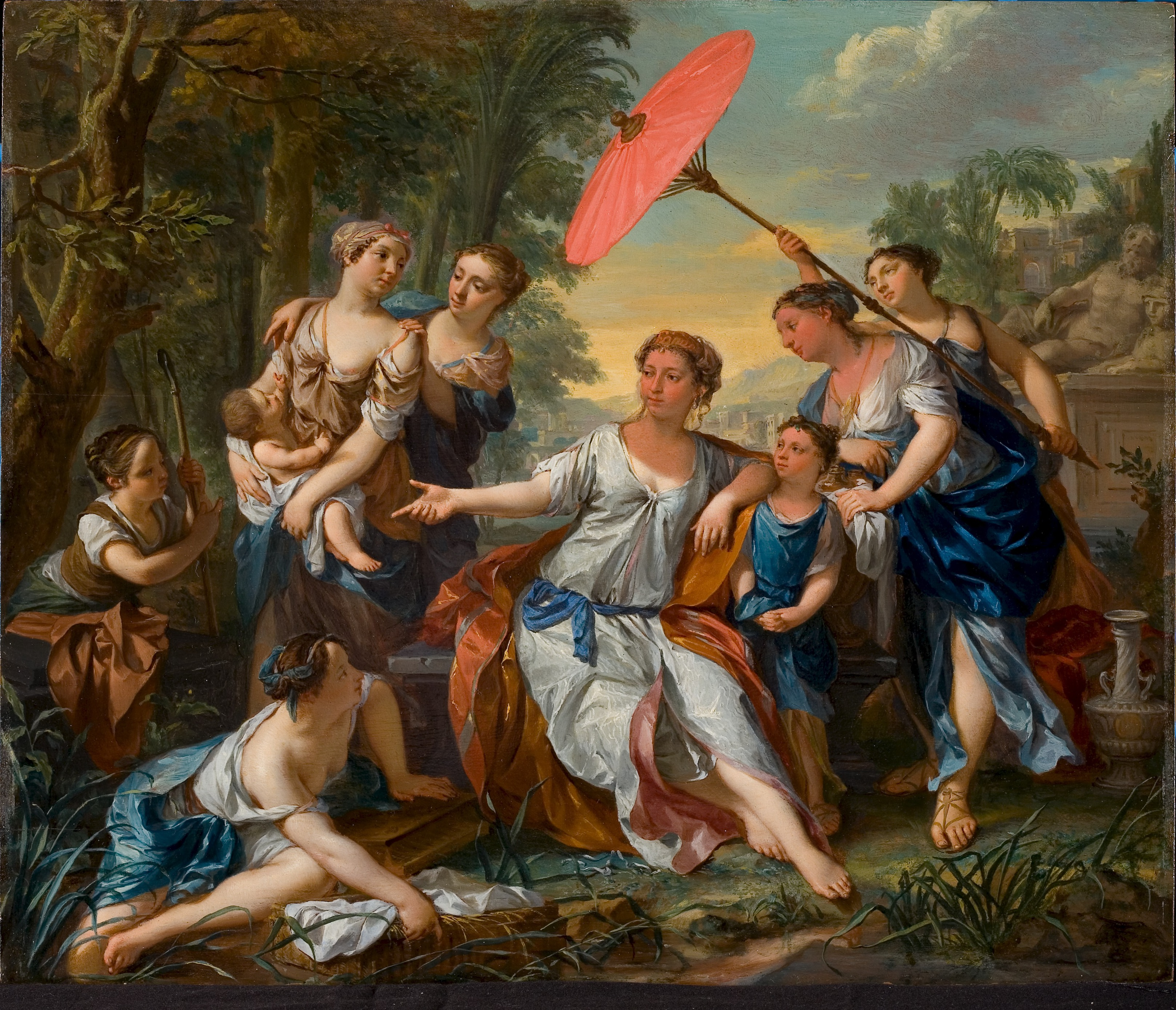
Moses Found by Pharaoh's Daughter

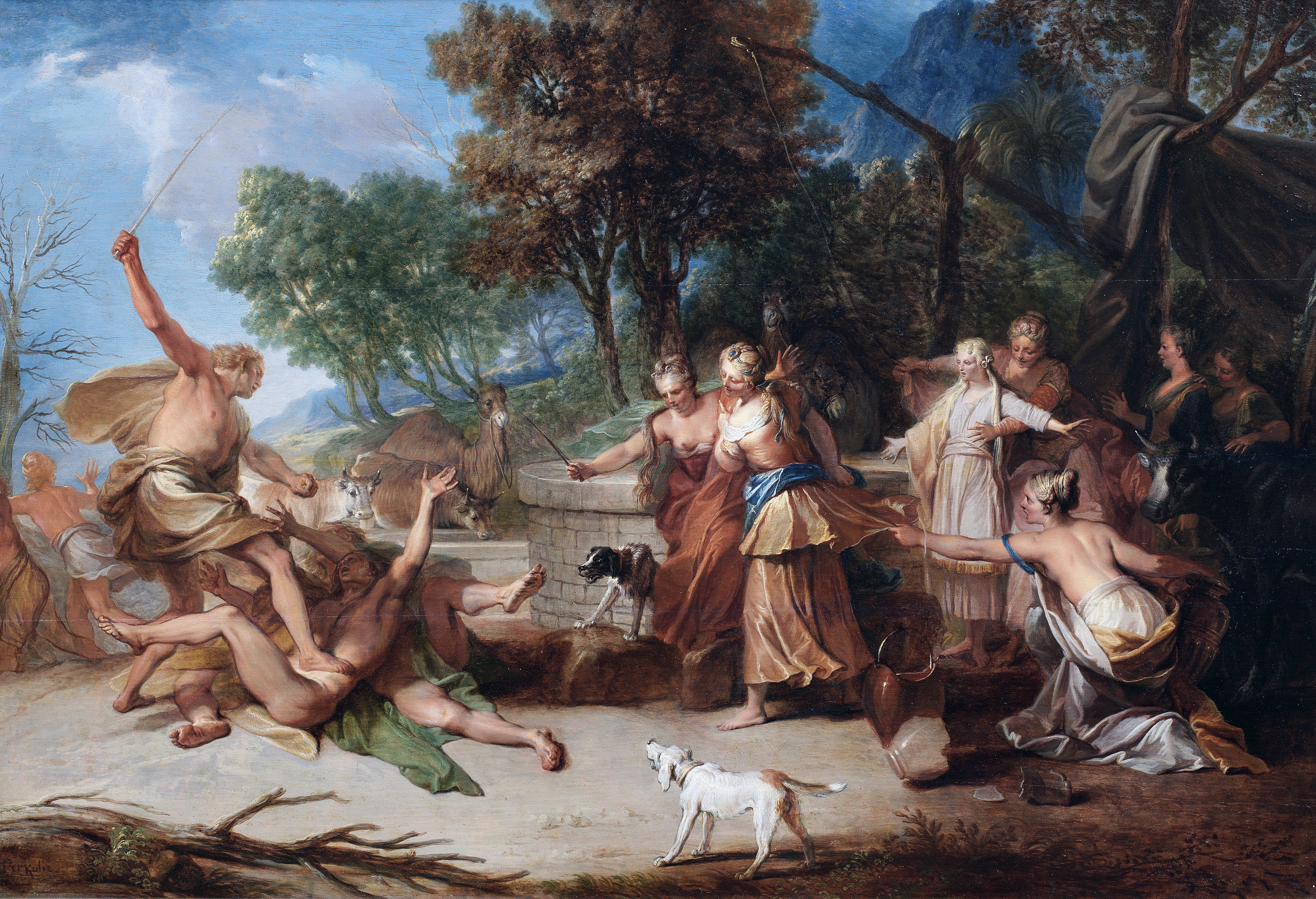
Moses defending the daughters of Jethro

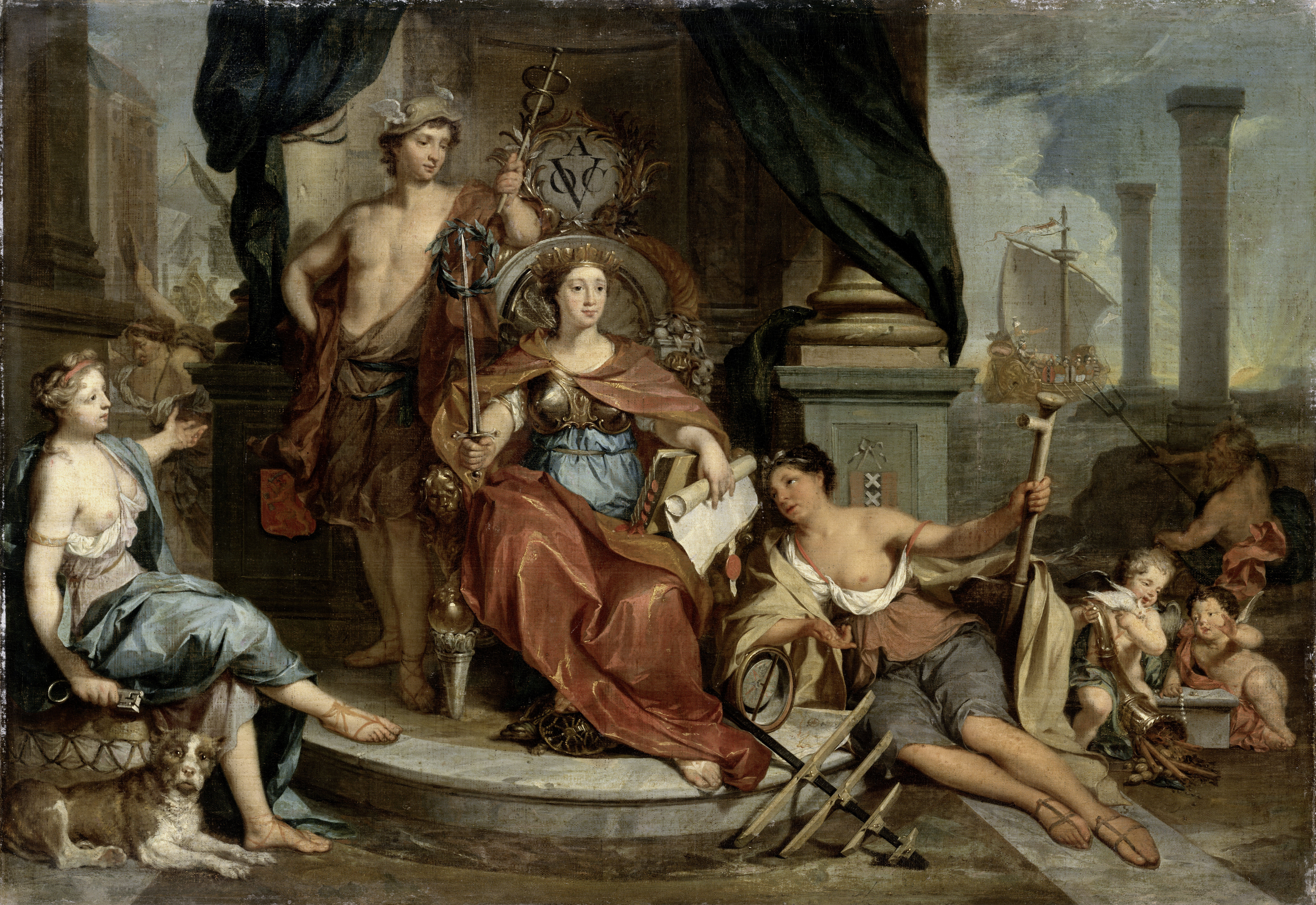
Allegorische voorstelling van de Amsterdamse Kamer van de Verenigde Oost-Indische Compagnie

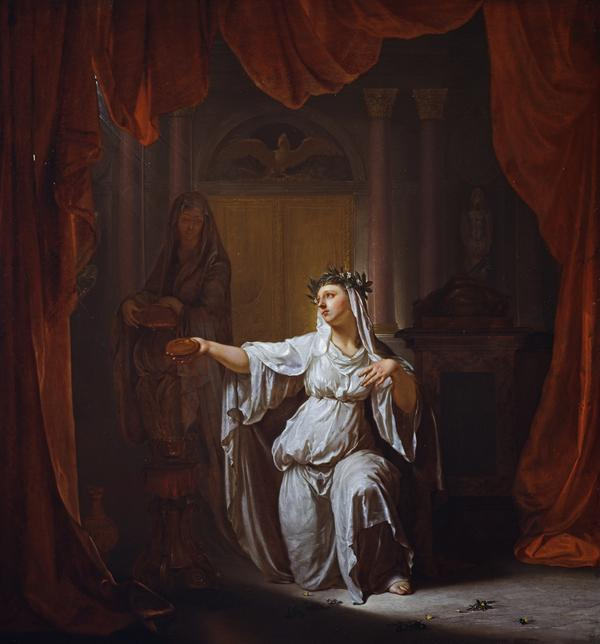
Two Vestal Virgins

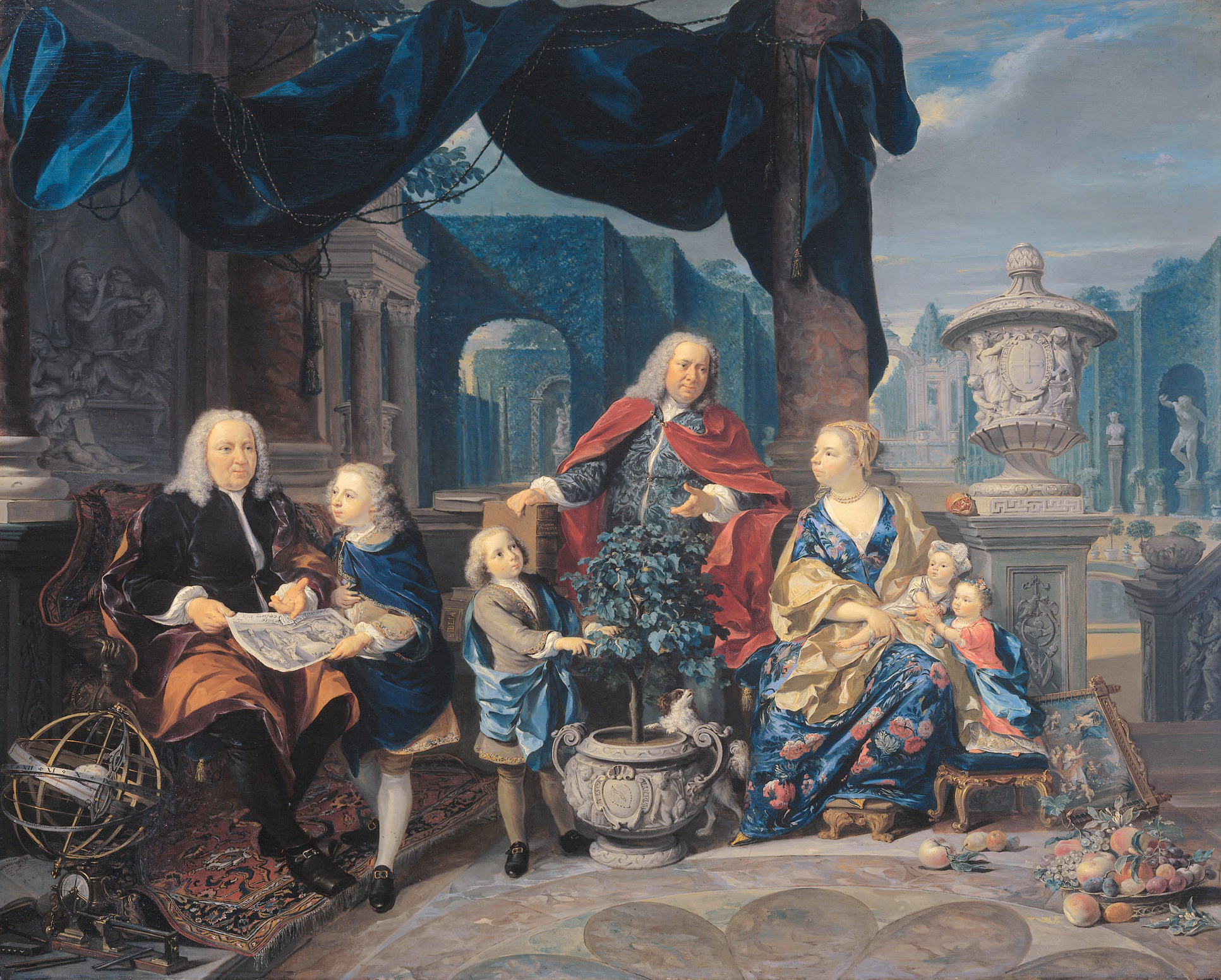
David van Mollem (1670–1746) and Jacob Sydervelt with his family, 1740
