= Oosthuizen =

- Village
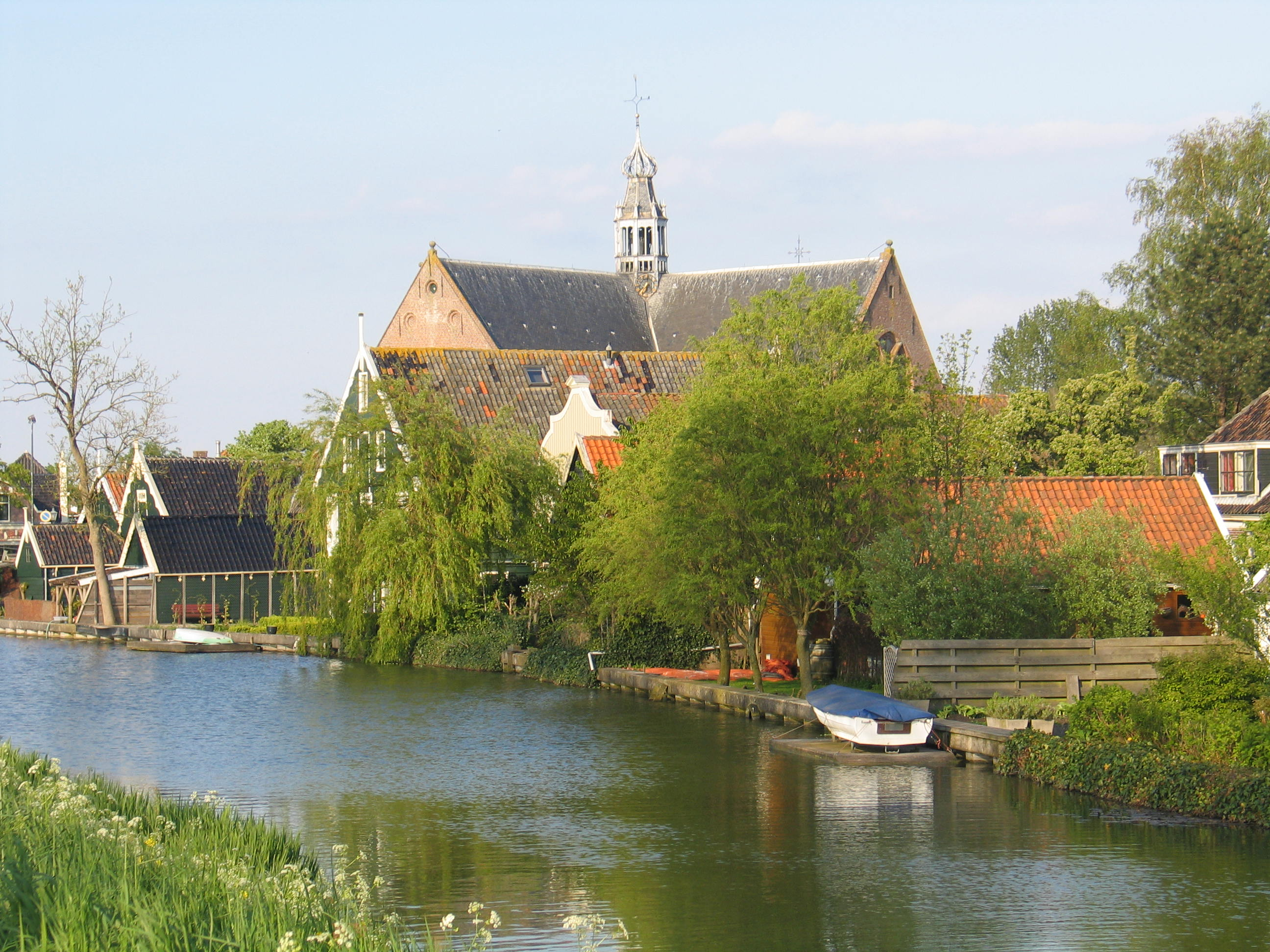

- Coat of arms

- Location in the Netherlands Location in the province of North Holland in the Netherlands
- Coordinates: 52°34′15″N 4°59′45″E
- Country: Netherlands
- Province: North Holland
- Municipality: Edam-Volendam

Area
  - Total: 6.82 km^{2} (2.63 sq mi)
- Elevation: −1.6 m (−5.2 ft)

Population (2021)
  - Total: 3,390
  - Density: 497/km^{2} (1,290/sq mi)
- Time zone: UTC+1 (CET)
  - Summer (DST): UTC+2 (CEST)
- Postal code: 1474
- Dialing code: 0299

Oosthuizen is a village in the Dutch province of North Holland. It is a part of the municipality of Edam-Volendam, and lies about 8 km north of Purmerend.

== History ==
The village was first mentioned in the 12th century as "in Asthusa minore", and means "eastern houses". Minor or luttic was often added to distinguish from Grosthuizen. Oosthuizen started as a peat excavation settlement in the Zeevang polder. In 1292, it became a free heerlijkheid (=no fief).

The Dutch Reformed church is cruciform church with ridge turret. The choir and transept were constructed in 1511. The nave is from 1518. The Catholic Franciscus van Assisi Church is a residential home which was converted to church in 1960.

Oosthuizen was home to 634 people in 1840. It was a separate municipality until 1970, when the new municipality of Zeevang was created. It was the capital of Zeevang. In 2016, it became part of the municipality of Edam-Volendam.

== Notable people ==
- Adriaan de Bruin (ca. 1700-1766), enslaved servant of the Dutch politician Adriaan van Bredehoff.

== Gallery ==
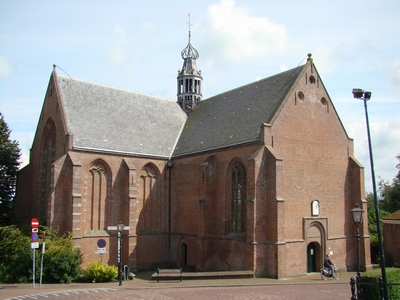
Church in Oosthuizen

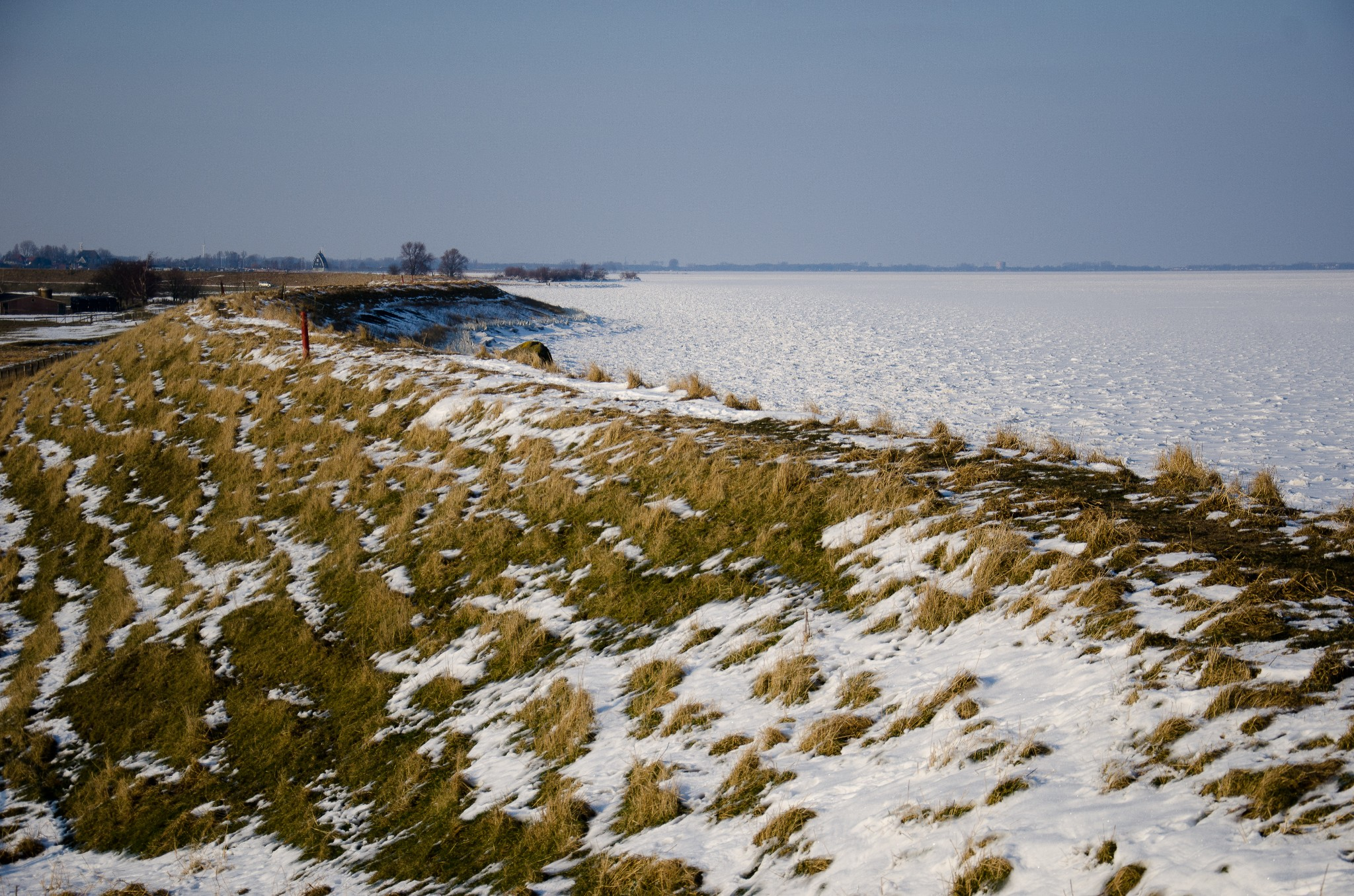
View on the IJsselmeer in winter

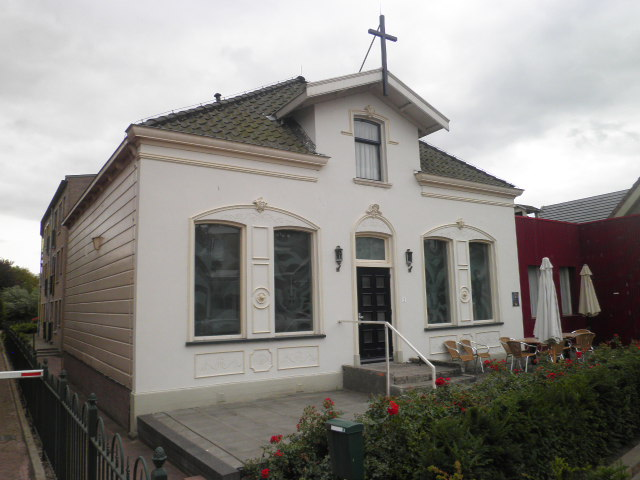
Catholic Franciscus van Assisi Church

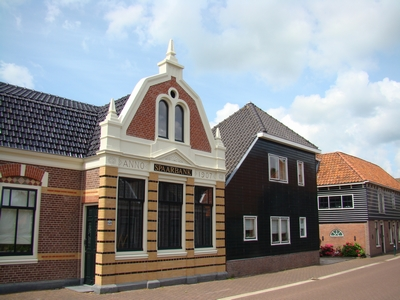
Houses in Oosthuizen
