= Hobrede =

- Village
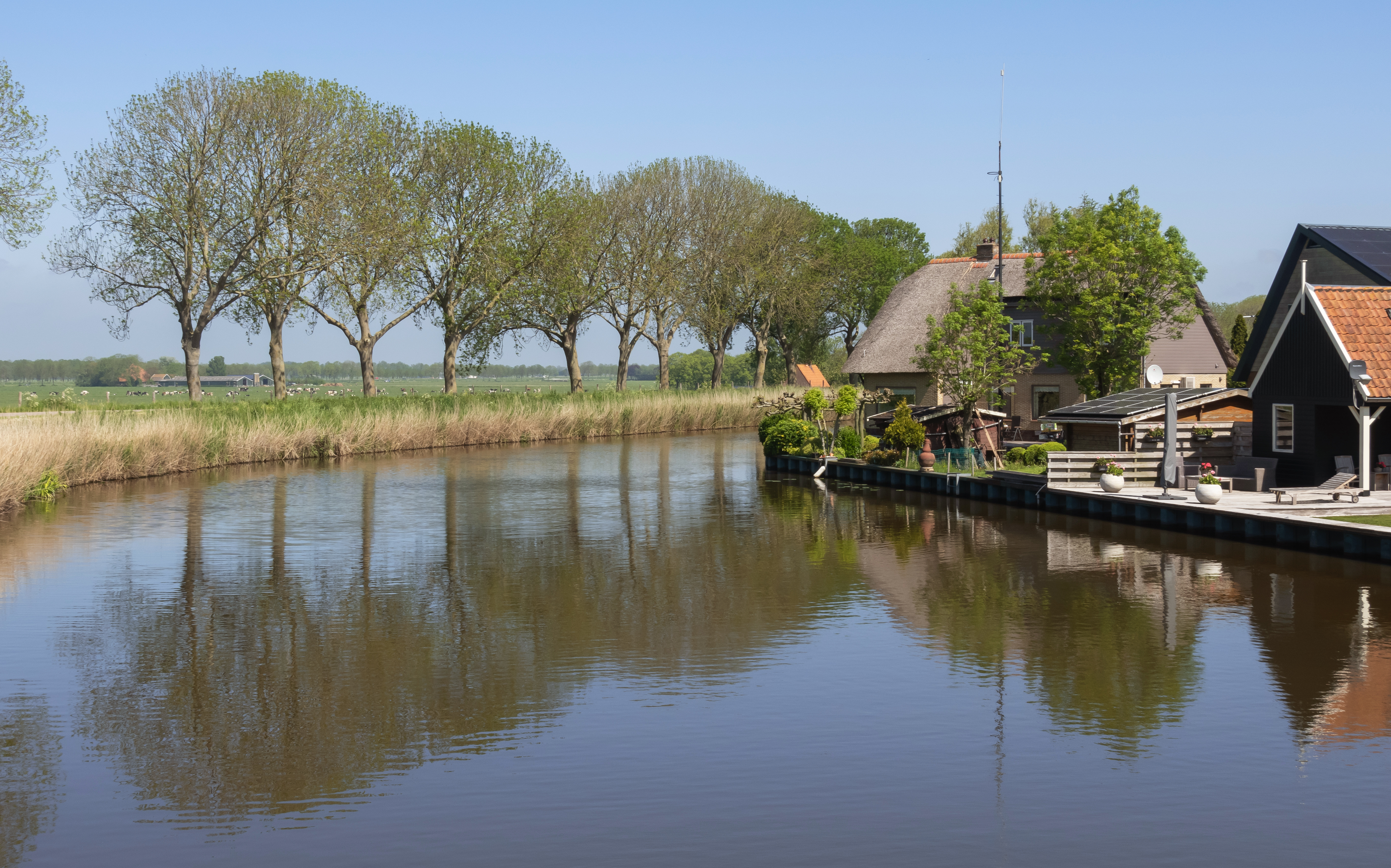
- View to the Oostdijk in Hobrede

- Location in the Netherlands Location in the province of North Holland in the Netherlands
- Coordinates: 52°32′42″N 4°58′51″E
- Country: Netherlands
- Province: North Holland
- Municipality: Edam-Volendam

Area
  - Total: 1.93 km^{2} (0.75 sq mi)
- Elevation: −1.3 m (−4.3 ft)

Population (2021)
  - Total: 170
  - Density: 88/km^{2} (230/sq mi)
- Time zone: UTC+1 (CET)
  - Summer (DST): UTC+2 (CEST)
- Postal code: 1477
- Dialing code: 0299

Hobrede is a village in the Dutch province of North Holland. It is a part of the municipality of Edam-Volendam, and lies about 4 km northeast of Purmerend.

The village was first mentioned in 1639 as Hobreet, and means the main side of the parcel of lands which connect the dike. The width of the land determined the maintenance fee of the farmer for the dike.

Hobrede used to have a church, but it was demolished in 1826. In 1840, it was home to 115 people. In 1991, the inhabitants of Hobrede built their own village house.
