= Beets, Netherlands =

Beets
- Village
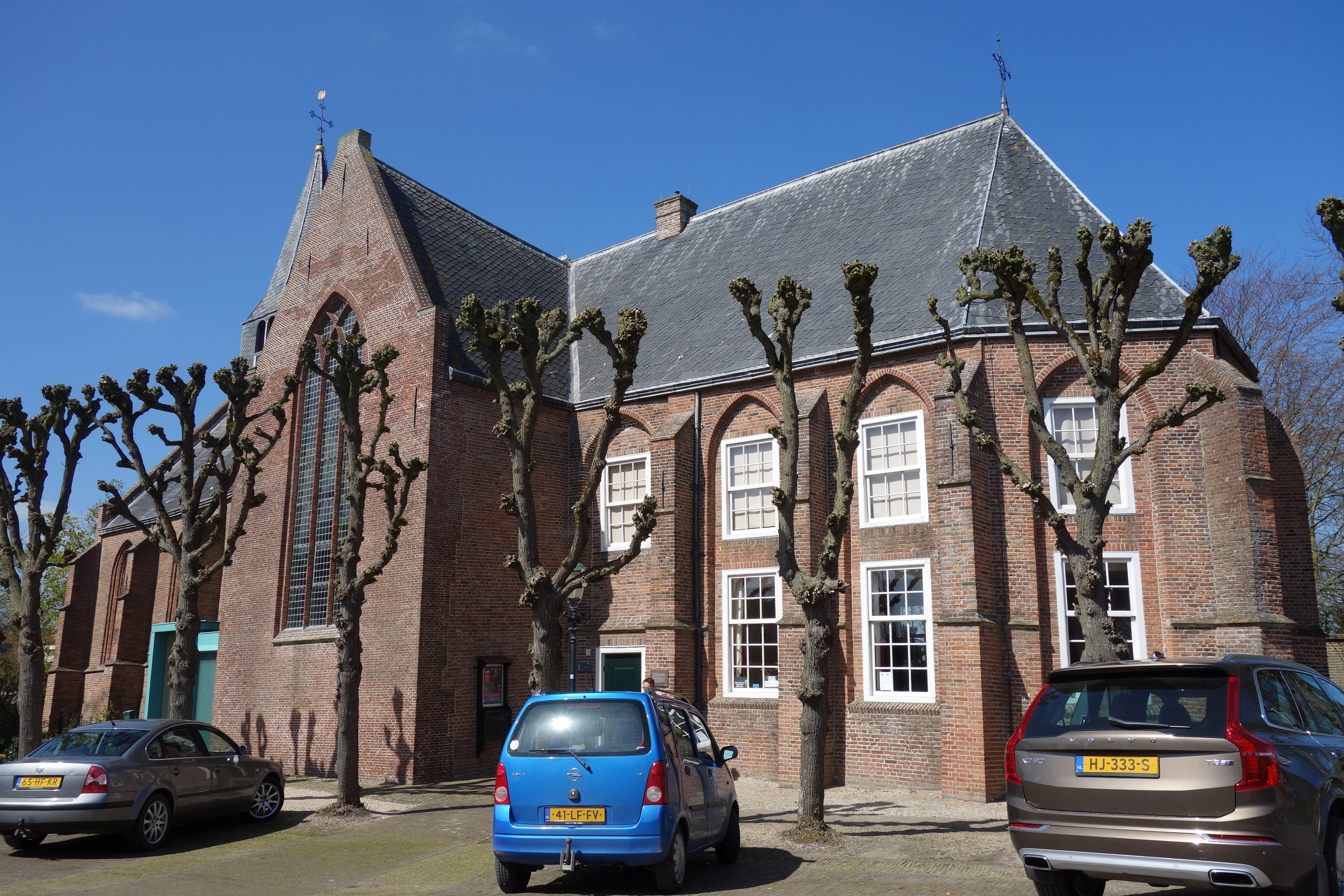
- Church of Beets

- Coat of arms

- Location in the Netherlands Location in the province of North Holland in the Netherlands
- Coordinates: 52°35′21″N 4°58′39″E
- Country: Netherlands
- Province: North Holland
- Municipality: Edam-Volendam

Area
  - Total: 4.05 km^{2} (1.56 sq mi)
- Elevation: −0.5 m (−1.6 ft)

Population (2021)
  - Total: 540
  - Density: 130/km^{2} (350/sq mi)
- Time zone: UTC+1 (CET)
  - Summer (DST): UTC+2 (CEST)
- Postal code: 1475
- Dialing code: 0299

Beets (Dutch pronunciation: [ˈbeːts]) is a village in the northwest Netherlands. It is a part of the municipality of Edam-Volendam, North Holland, and lies about 9 km southwest of Hoorn.

== History ==
The village was first mentioned in 1435 as "van der Beetze", and means "low lying (often flooded in the winter) land". Beets developed in the late 13th century on the southern part of the Beetskoog polder.

The Dutch Reformed church is a single aisled cruciform church from the 15th century. It was restored in 1873 and 1961.

Beets was home to 412 people in 1840. Until 1970, Beets was a separate municipality. In 2016, it became part of the municipality of Edam-Volendam.

== Gallery ==
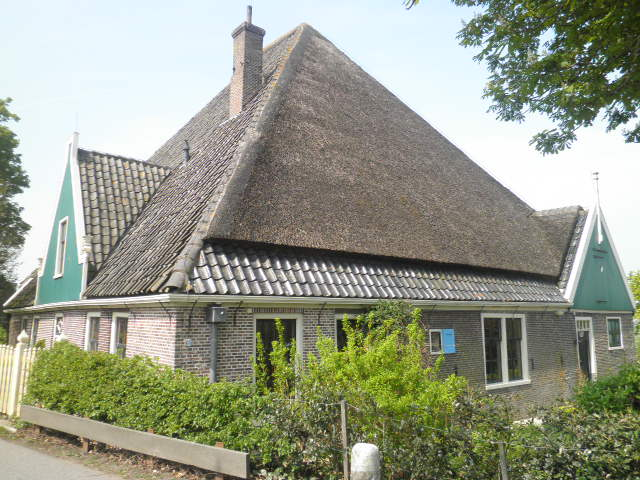
Farm in Beets

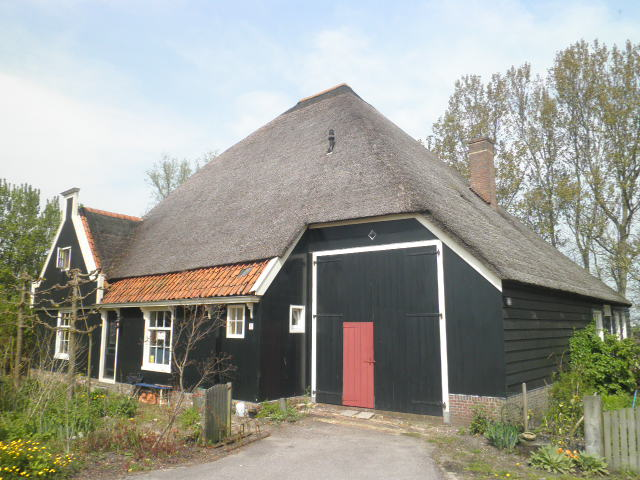
Farm in Beets
