= Edam-Volendam =

- Municipality
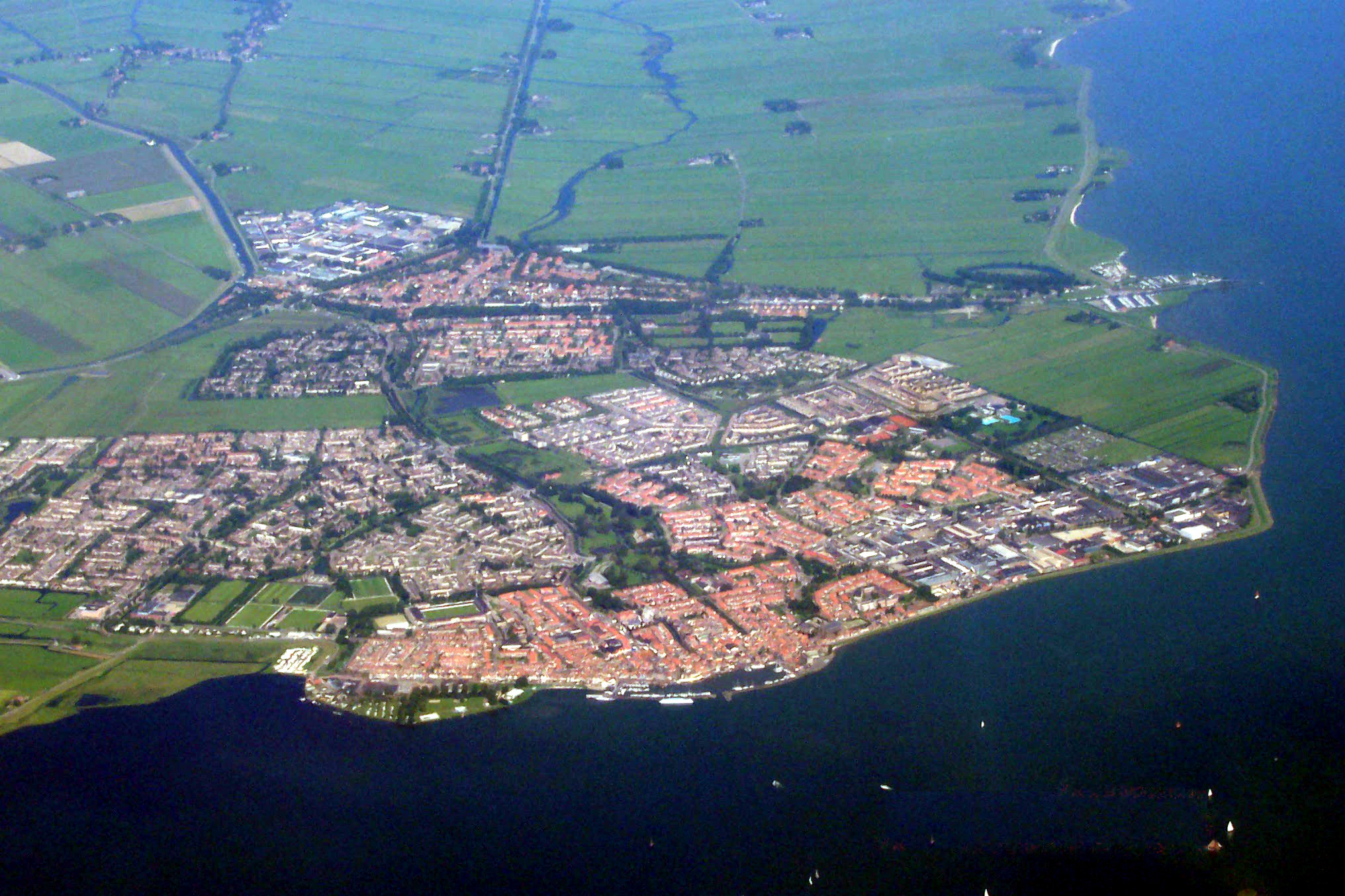
- Aerial view of Edam-Volendam

- Flag Coat of arms

- Location in North Holland
- Coordinates: 52°30′N 5°3′E
- Country: Netherlands
- Province: North Holland

Government
  - Body: Municipal council
  - Mayor: Rick Beukers (VVD)

Area
  - Total: 80.00 km^{2} (30.89 sq mi)
  - Land: 54.33 km^{2} (20.98 sq mi)
  - Water: 25.67 km^{2} (9.91 sq mi)
- Elevation: −1 m (−3.3 ft)

Population (January 2021)
  - Total: 36,268
  - Density: 668/km^{2} (1,730/sq mi)
- Time zone: UTC+1 (CET)
  - Summer (DST): UTC+2 (CEST)
- Postcode: 1130–1135, 1470–1477
- Area code: 0299
- Website: www.edam-volendam.nl

Edam-Volendam (Dutch: [eːˌdɑm ˈvoːlə(n)ˌdɑm]) is a municipality in the northwest Netherlands, in the province of North Holland, primarily consisting of the towns of Edam and Volendam. It is situated on the western shore of the Markermeer, just north of Waterland. In 2021, it had a population of 36,268.

In 2016, the former municipality of Zeevang merged with Edam-Volendam.

== Local government ==
The municipal council of Edam-Volendam has 25 seats. The 2026 election results were as follows:

- ONS Belang: 5 seats
- Volendam '80: 5 seats
- Zeevangs Belang: 3 seats
- GroenLinks / PvdA: 3 seats
- VVD: 2 seats
- Forum voor Democratie: 2 seats
- Lokaal Edam-Volendam: 2 seats
- CDA: 1 seat
- BVNL: 1 seats
- Democrats 66: 1 seat

== Topography ==
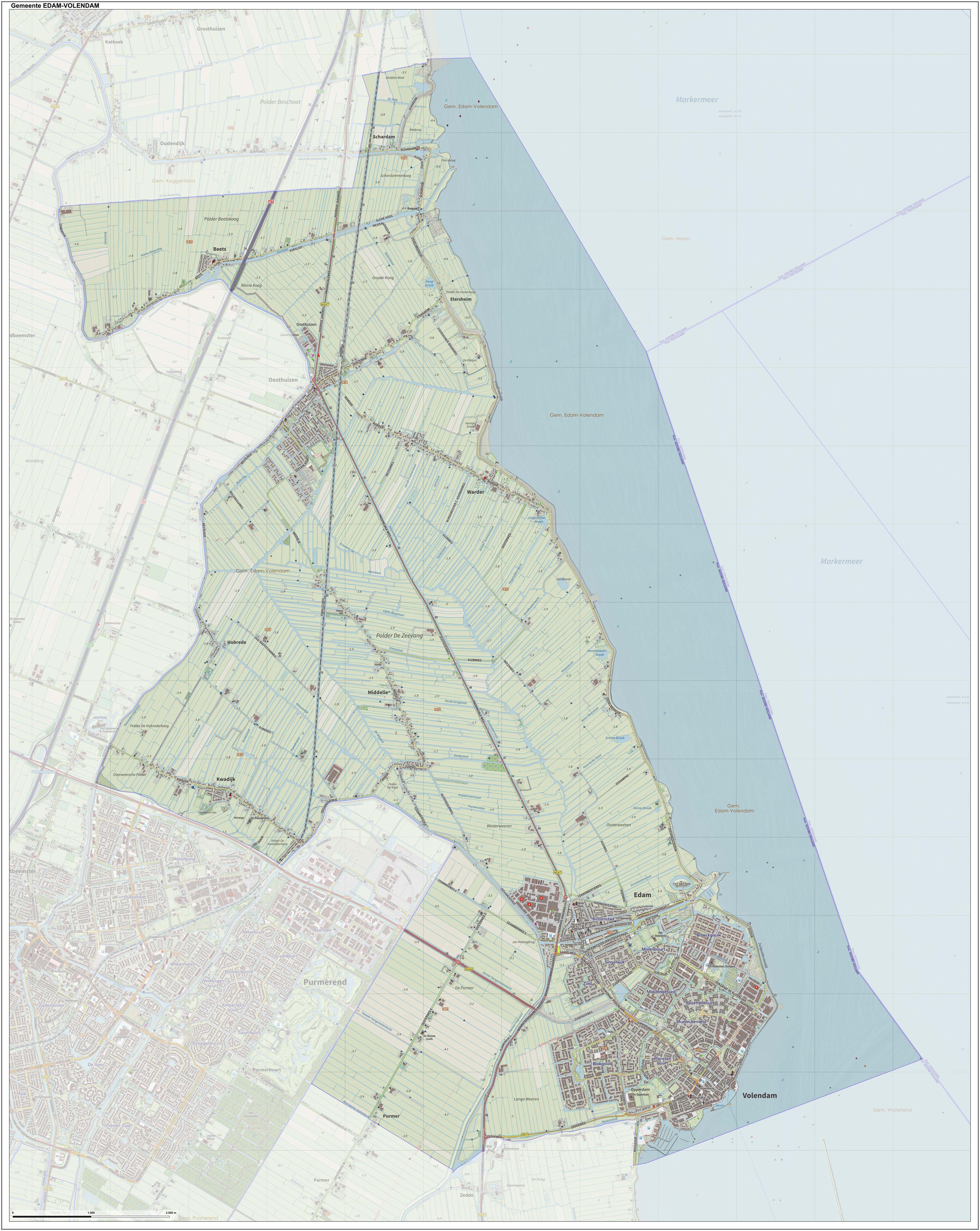
Map of the municipality, January 2016.

== Notable people ==
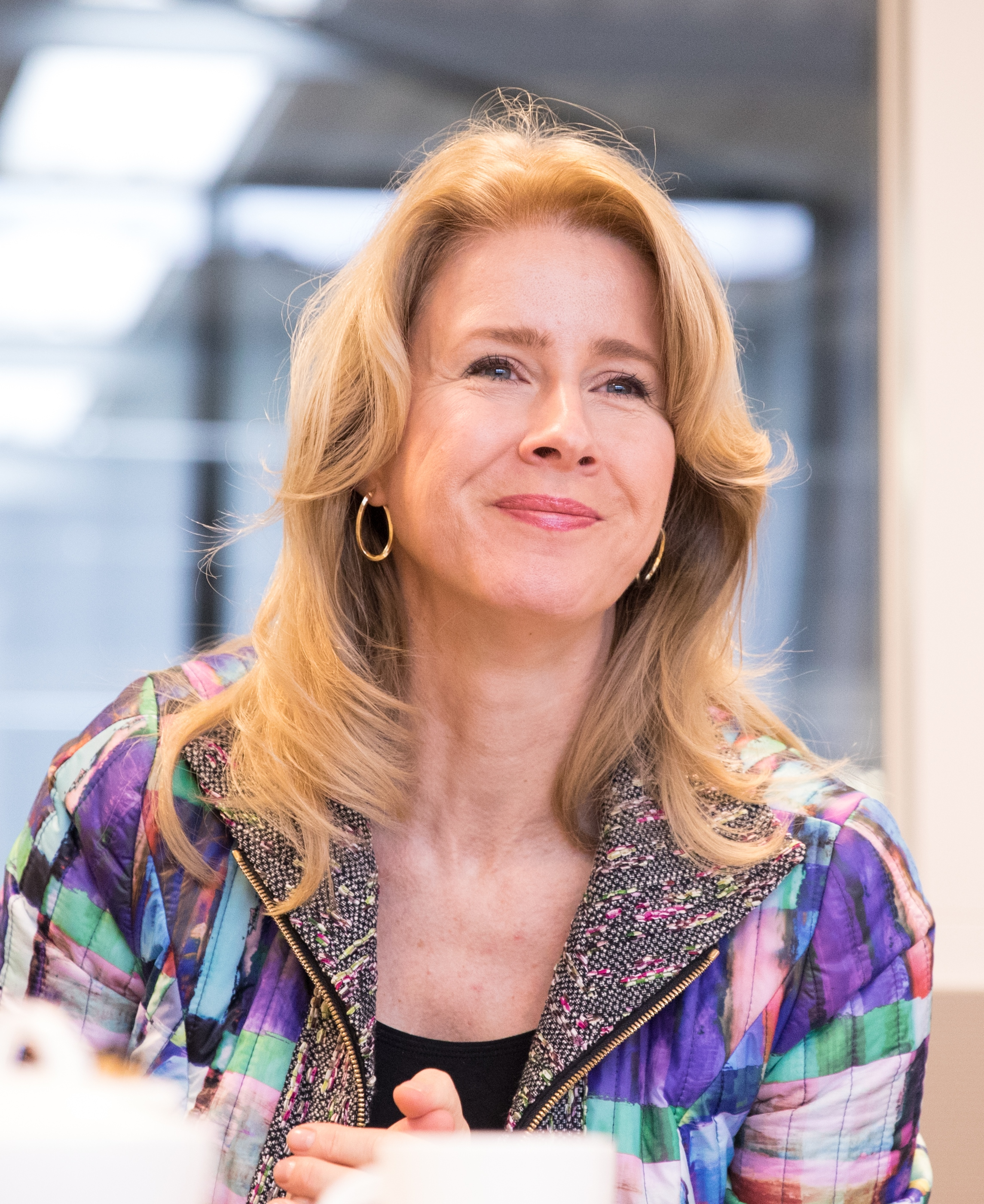
Mona Keijzer, 2017

- Geertje Dircx (ca.1610–1615 in Edam – ca.1656) the lover of Rembrandt van Rijn
- Ed van der Elsken (1925–1990), Dutch photographer and filmmaker
- Boudewijn Hendricksz (died 1626) Dutch corsair and later Admiral; also burgemeester of Edam
- Trijntje Keever (1616–1633) tallest female person in recorded history, standing 2.54 metres (8 ft 4 in) tall when she died
- Mona Keijzer (born 1968 in Edam) Dutch politician
- Jan Keizer (born 1949 in Volendam) Dutch singer and composer, with the pop band BZN
- Geraldine Kemper (born 1990 in Volendam) Dutch TV presenter
- Bernadette (born Bernadette Kraakman, 1959 in Volendam) Dutch singer, took part in the 1983 Eurovision Song Contest
- Maribelle (born Marie Kwakman, 1960 in Volendam) Dutch singer, took part in the 1984 Eurovision Song Contest
- Maria Leer (1788 in Edam – 1866) prophetess and Dutch religious figure
- Kristofer Schipper (1934 in Järnskog – 2021) Dutch sinologist and academic
- Jan Janz Slop (1643 in Edam – 1727) Dutch Golden Age painter
- Jan Smit (born 1985 in Volendam) Dutch singer, TV host and actor and football director
- Abraham Staphorst (ca.1638 in Edam – 1696) Dutch Golden Age painter
- Piet Veerman (born 1943 in Volendam) Dutch pop musician
- Abraham Isaacsen Verplanck (1606–1690) early settler in New Netherlands, emigrated ca. 1633

=== Sport ===
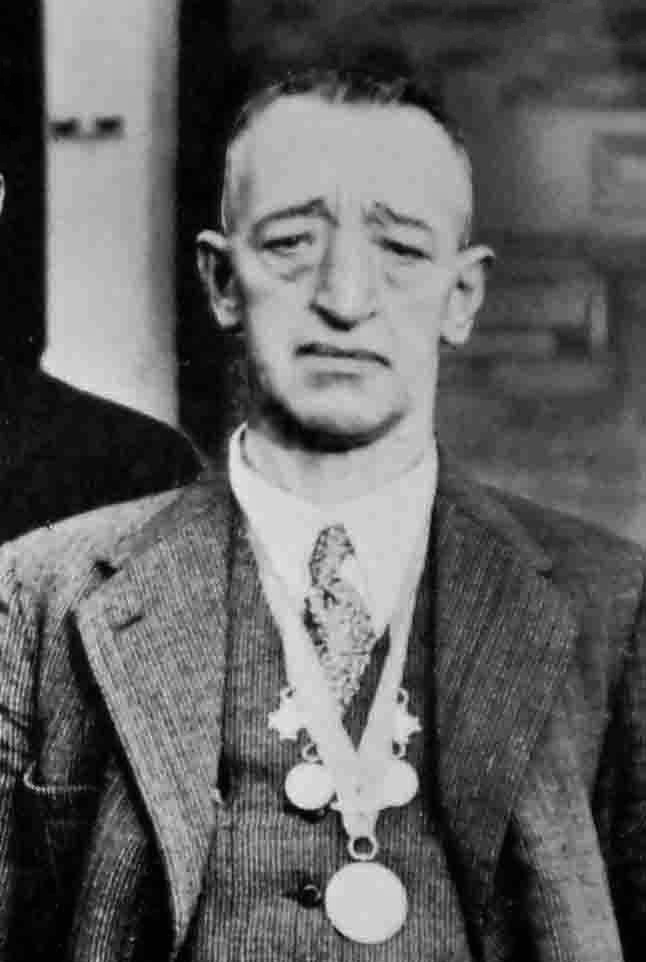
Coen de Koning, 1934

- Wim Jonk (born 1966 in Volendam) Dutch football coach and former player with 368 club caps
- Coen de Koning (1879–1954) speed skater and cyclist
- Gerry Koning (born 1980 in Volendam) Dutch former footballer with over 350 club caps
- Arnold Mühren (born 1951 in Volendam) Dutch football manager and former midfielder with 516 club caps
- Gerrie Mühren (1946 in Volendam – 2013) Dutch footballer with over 350 club caps
- Henny Schilder (born 1984 in Volendam) Dutch football player, 375 club caps with FC Volendam
- Pier Tol (born 1958 in Volendam) Dutch retired international footballer with 344 club caps
- Jack Tuijp (born 1983 in Volendam) retired Dutch football striker with about 400 club caps

== Gallery ==
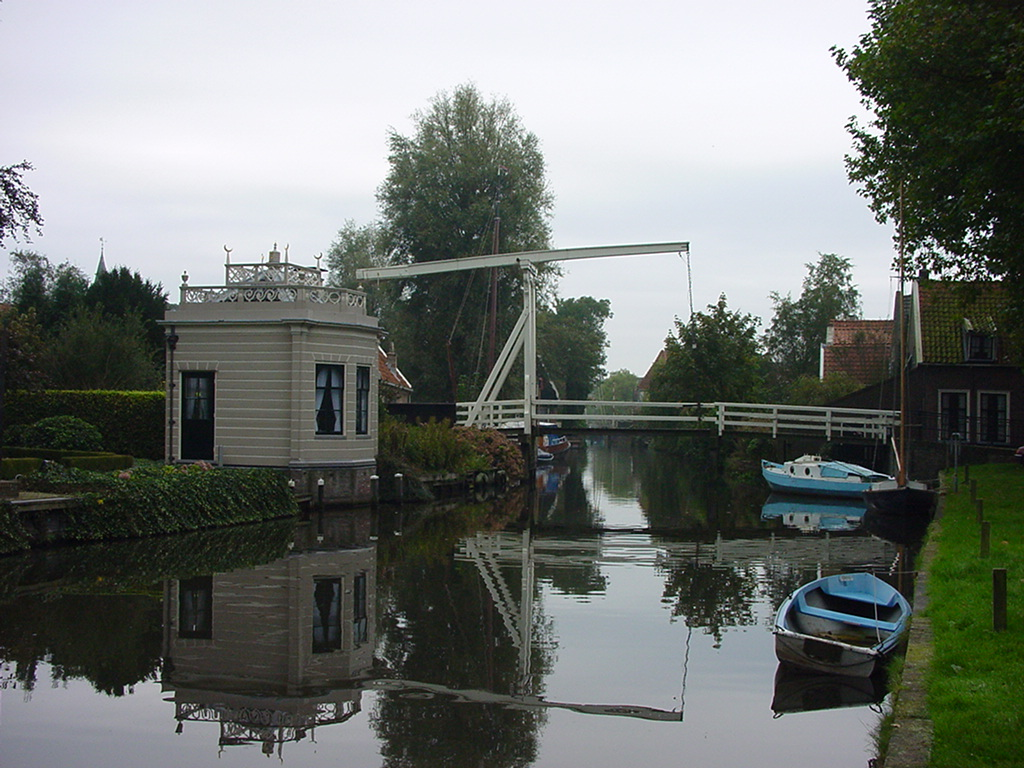
Edam – canal bridge

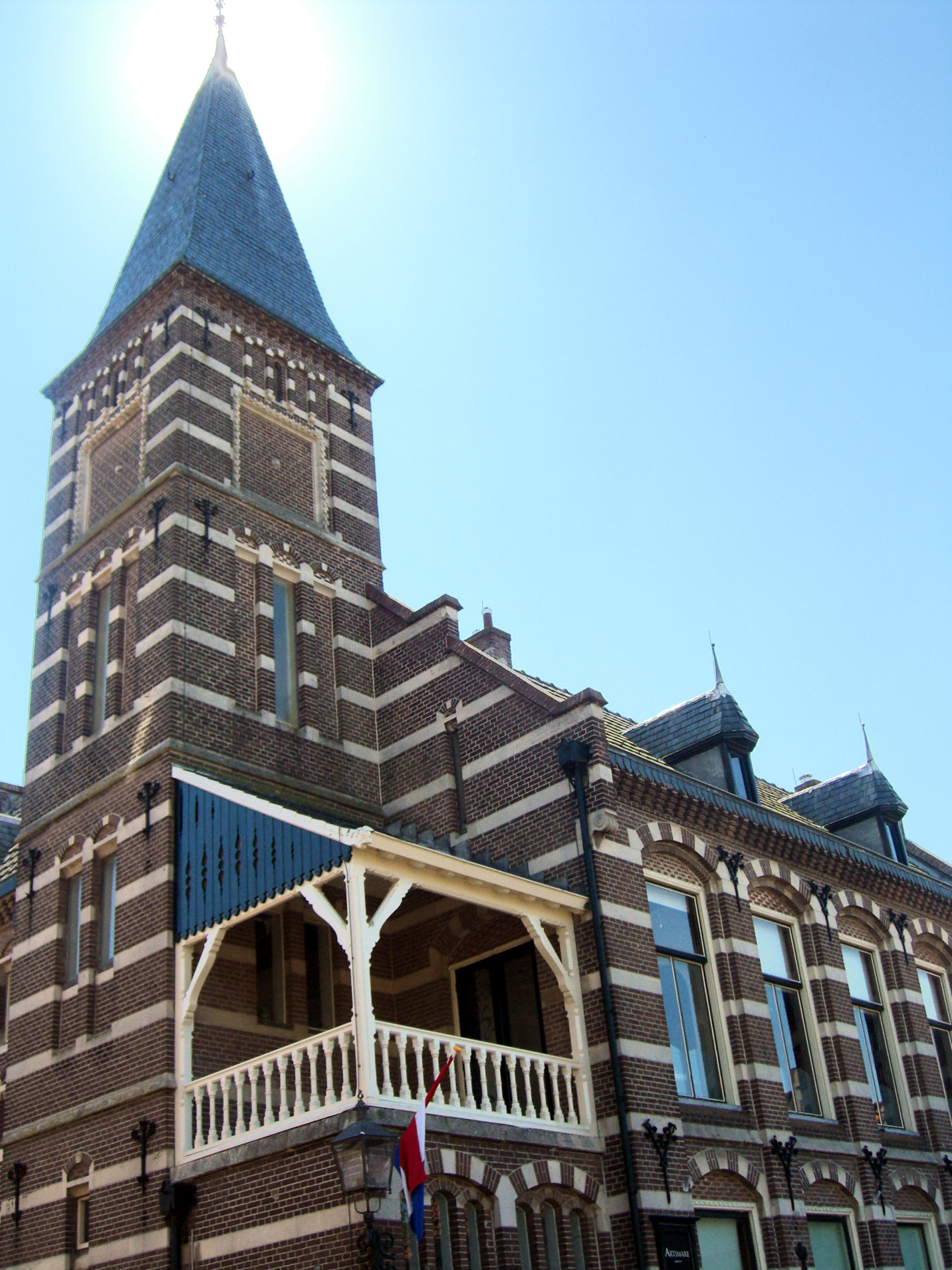
Edam – the former post office

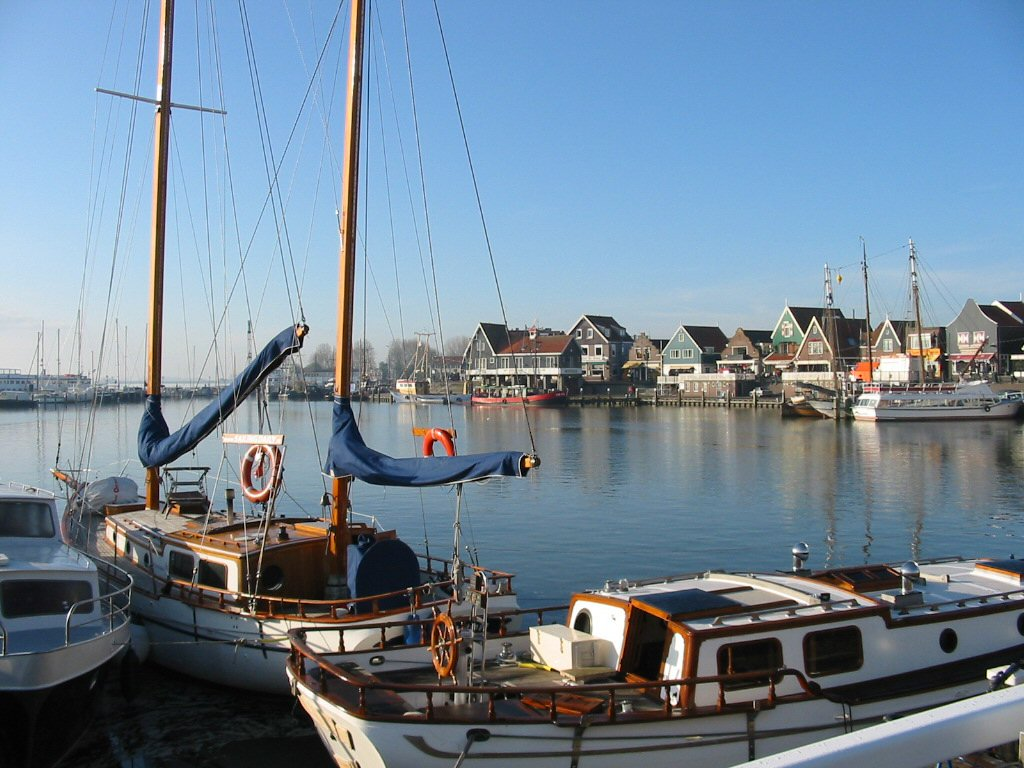
The harbour at Volendam

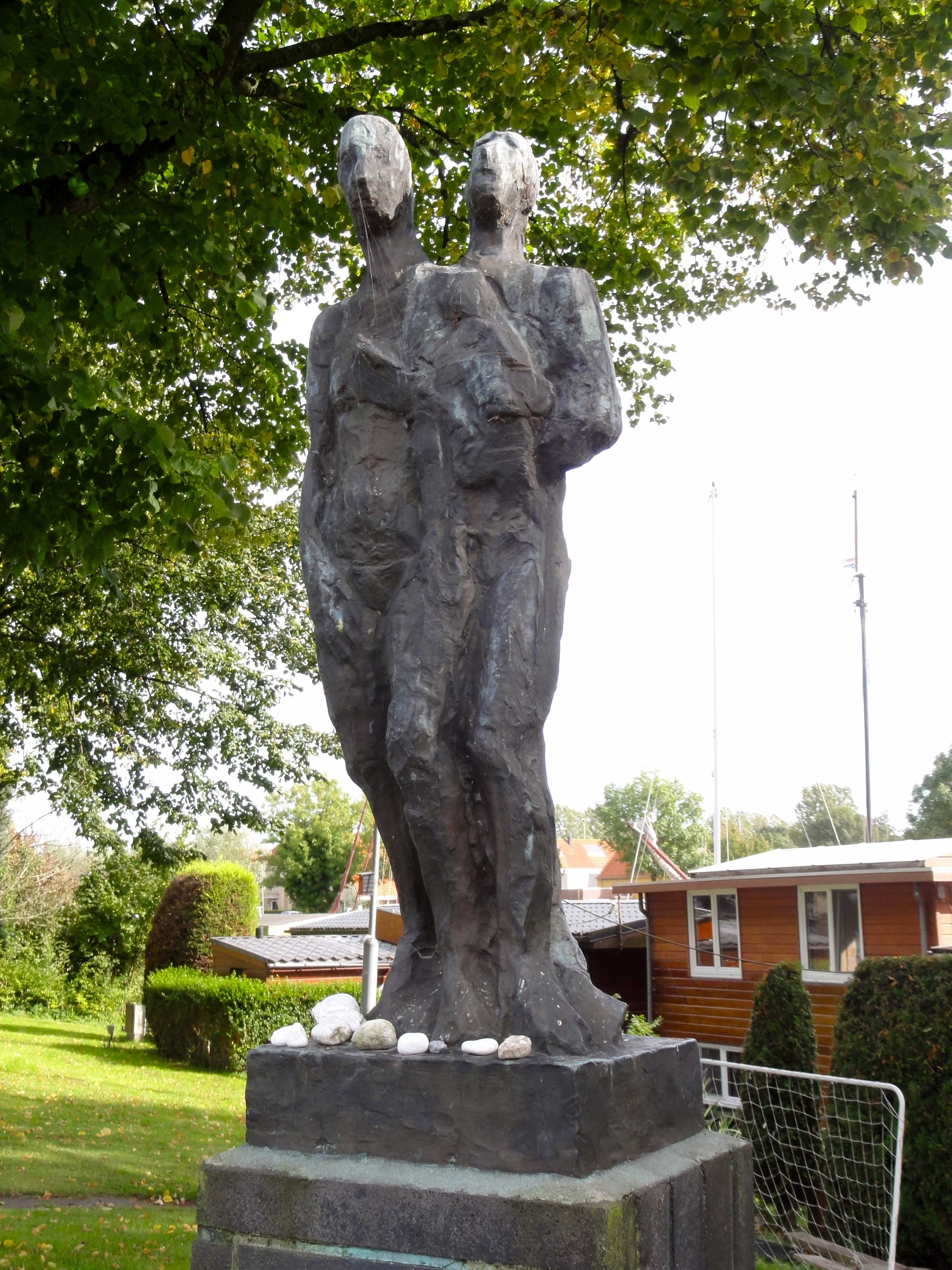
Edam – De tochtgenoten by Hubert van Lith

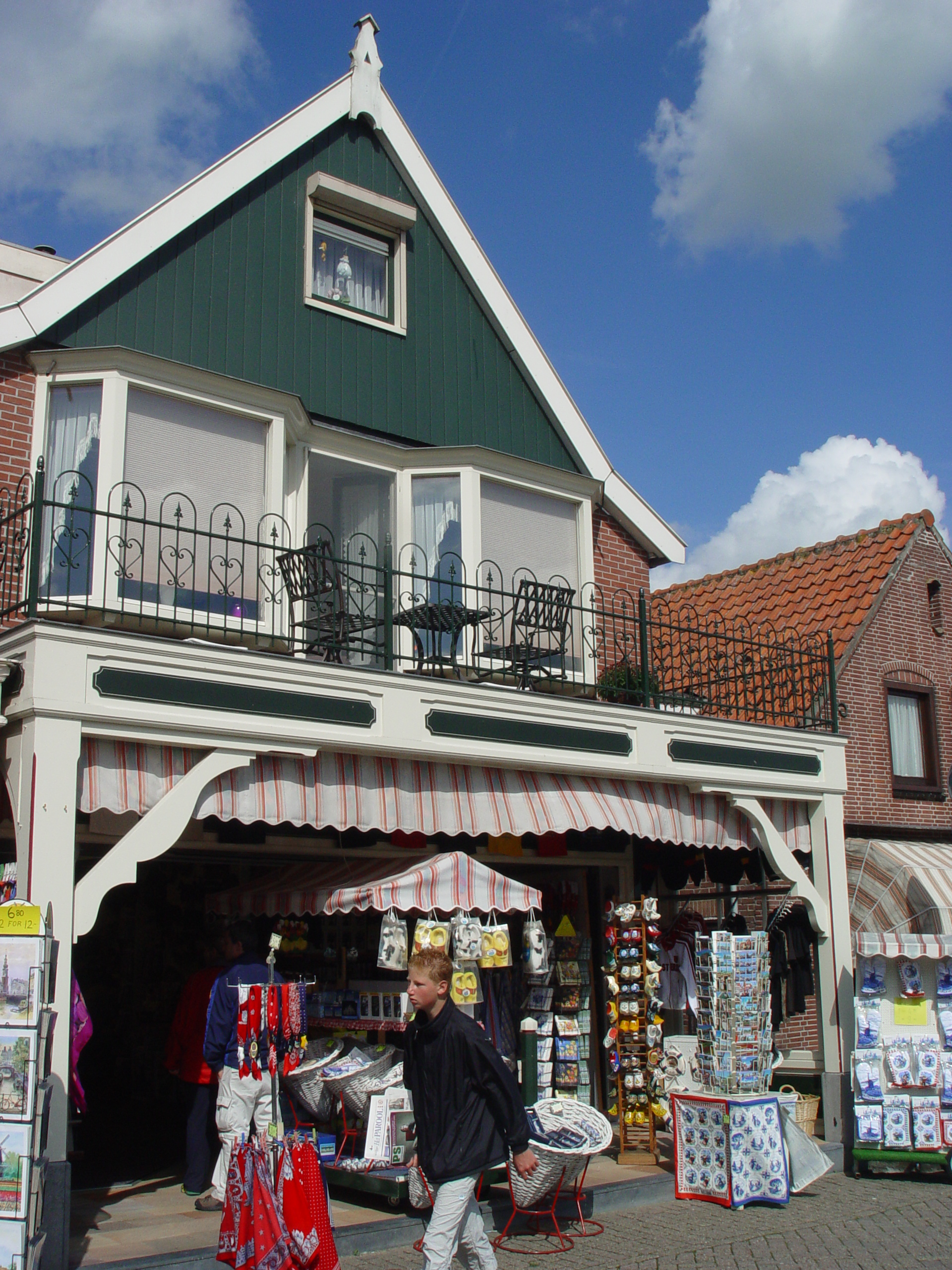
Volendam
