= Belgian refugees =

Overview of Belgian people seeking refuge abroad

Following the creation of Belgium as a nation state, Belgian people have sought refuge abroad on several occasions. From the early days of independence and the threat of The Netherlands or France, to two World Wars and the Independence of Congo, Belgians have been on the run themselves, for various reasons, as refugees.

== Before 1914 ==
=== Little England beyond Wales (12th c.) ===
Both Henry I and Henry II systematically settled Flemish colonists in south Pembrokeshire that became referred to as Little England beyond Wales. This policy was intended to secure a part of Wales, a then frontier region for them, to be loyal to the monarchy. As written by the twelfth-century chronicler, Gervase of Canterbury, this was also driven by the desire to have the 'warmongering' Flemish, Lupi Flandrenses ('Flemish wolves') out of England. Reflecting contemporary hostility toward Flemish mercenaries and settlers in England. As an increasing number of 'foreigners' settled, parts of the existing Welsh population were displaced or assimilated, contributing to a long-term reduction in Welsh-speaking communities in the area. The Normans and the Flemish settlement contributed to the emergence of the Landsker Line, a linguistic divide roughly from Newgale on the west coast to Amroth on the south east coast, a line which remains as a regional divide. The Flemish influx helped English to become the dominant language in the region.

=== Lace-making in Germany (16th c.) ===
Annaberg-Buchholz (German pronunciation: [ˈanabɛɐ̯k ˈbuːx.hɔlts]) is a town in the Free State of Saxony, Germany, in the Ore Mountains, and is the capital of the district of Erzgebirgskreis. Annaberg, together with the neighbouring suburb, Buchholz, is the chief seat of the braid- and lace-making industry in Germany, introduced here by Barbara Uthmann in 1561, and further developed by Belgian refugees, who, driven from their country by the Duke of Alba, settled here in 1590.

== First World War ==
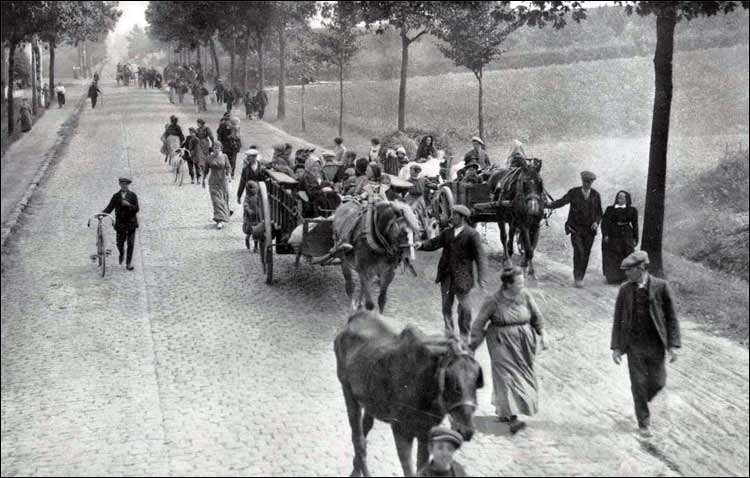
Belgian refugees in 1914

When Germany invaded Belgium on 4 August 1914, after the Belgian authorities had denied German forces free passage through Belgium on their way to Paris, Britain declared war on Germany. This was a direct result of the London Treaty of 1830 (which had been recognised by the Netherlands only in 1839).

=== Britain ===
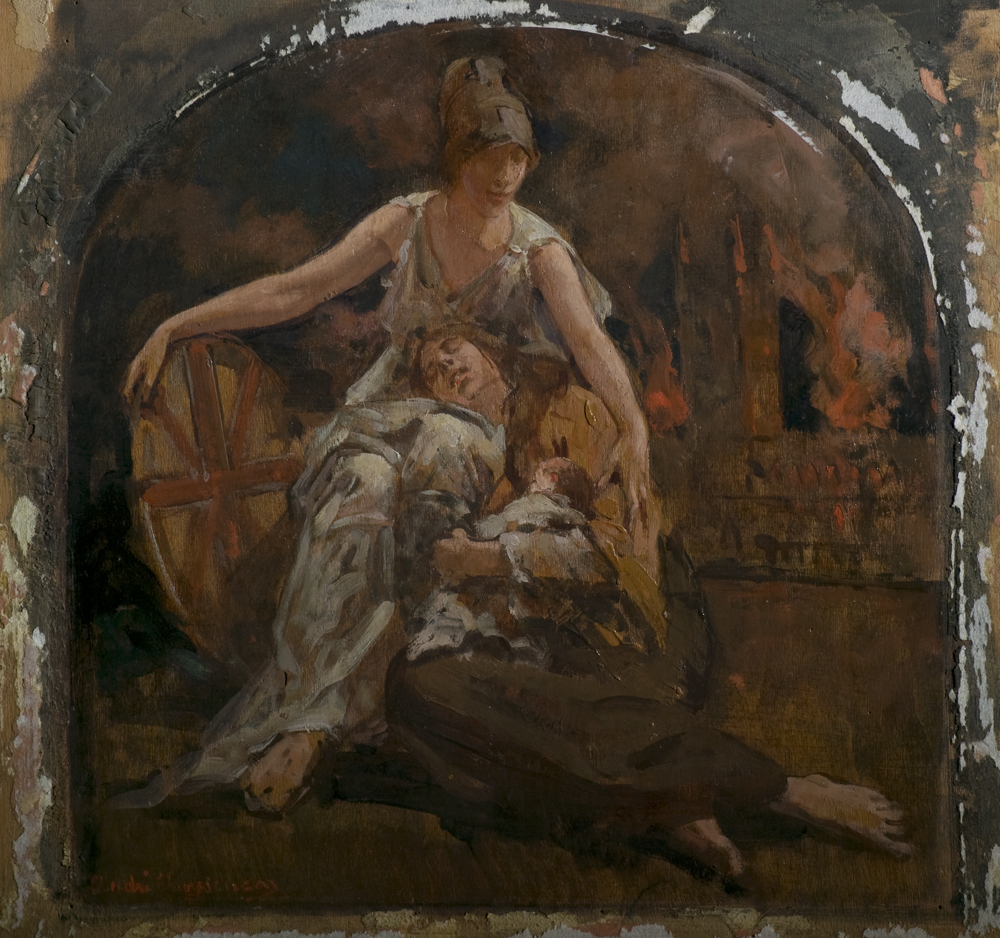
"Britannia with Belgian Refugees" (1916) by Belgian painter André Cluysenaar

Because archive material of the hundreds of local Belgian refugee committees is scant and incomplete and because systems of registration were not watertight (nor did they run from the very start of the conflict), it is very difficult to estimate the number of Belgians that sought refuge in Britain during World War I. Estimates vary between 225,000 and 265,000. The estimation does not include the roughly 150,000 Belgian soldiers that took leave in Britain at some point during the war, and an additional 25,000 wounded Belgian soldiers convalescing in Britain. The fullest account is given in Belgian Refugee Relief in England during the Great War by Peter Calahan (Garland Publishing, New York and London, 1982).

=== Ireland ===
Because of the tension present already before the First World War and reaching a turning point with the Easter Rising, it is difficult to have Ireland listed here as part of Britain, or not. Given the fact that the story of Belgians in Ireland during the war was a rather different one to those in Britain, not least because of the major difference in numbers, Ireland is retained as a separate entity here.

- Dunshaughlin (Irish: Dún Seachlainn (Seachlann's fort)) or locally Irish: Domhnach Seachnaill (St Seachnall's Church) is a town in County Meath, Ireland. In the post-famine years, the workhouse rarely had more than a few dozen inmates. During the First World War, the building was used to accommodate Belgian refugees, some of whom died there and were buried in the paupers' graveyard. In 1920-21, the building was taken over as a barracks by the Black and Tans during the Irish War of Independence.

=== Netherlands ===
- Uden is a municipality and a town in the province of North Brabant, Netherlands. After the peace of Munster in 1648, Uden remained outside the Dutch Republic and was a haven of religious tolerance for Catholics from the nearby towns of Veghel, Nistelrode and Erp, who build their churches on the municipality its borders. During World War I (in which the Netherlands stayed neutral) North Brabant was inundated by Belgian refugees. A refugee camp was erected at Vluchtoord in Uden, which housed several thousand Flemish refugees until 1918.
- Simon Berman (1861–1934) was the mayor of Kwadijk, Middelie, Warder, Schagen, Bedum, and Alblasserdam in the Netherlands. He was the first mayor of Kwadijk, Middelie, and Warder to actually live in one of those villages. As mayor of Schagen, he handled a double murder case that drew national media attention and advanced a professional school and regional light rail. In Alblasserdam, he addressed the local impacts of World War I. Shortly after Berman was installed in 1914 as Mayor of Alblasserdam, World War I started. While the Netherlands remained neutral, local government of Alblasserdam and its mayor kept busy with such impacts as 60 Belgian refugees within the municipal boundaries. An ad hoc municipal fund for the unemployed was established.

=== Elsewhere ===
- Lou Henry Hoover (1874–1944) was the wife of President of the United States Herbert Hoover and served as First Lady from 1929 to 1933. During World War I, she assisted her husband in providing relief for Belgian refugees. For her work, she was decorated in 1919 by King Albert.

== Interwar years ==
Otto and Ernst Schiff, who had been instrumental in accommodating the Belgian refugees of Jewish origin, became crucial in the reception and accommodation of German exiles in Britain during the latter half of the 1930s.

== Second World War ==
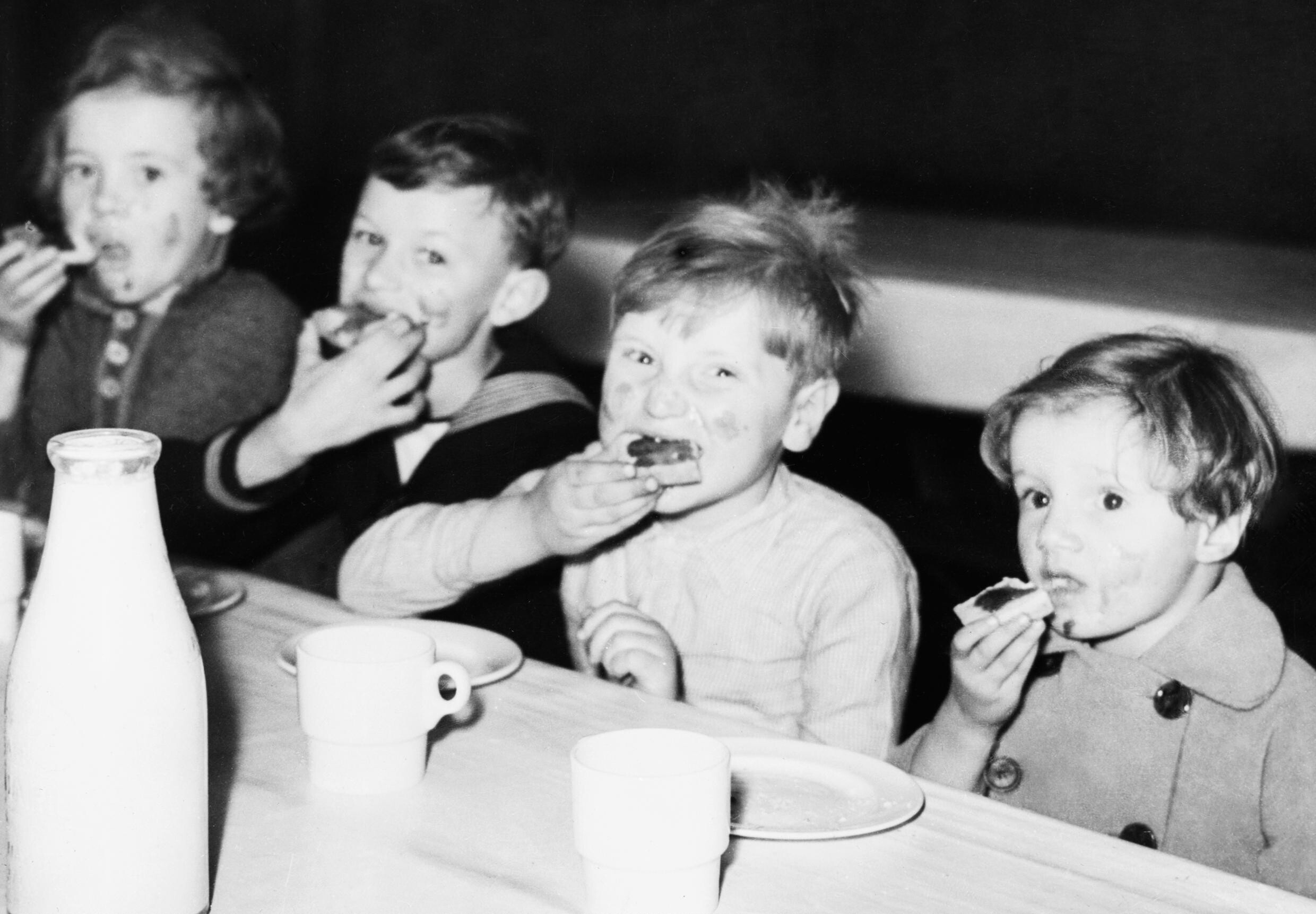
Belgian refugee children eating bread and jam, London, 1940

The invasion of Belgium by Nazi Germany started on 10 May 1940 under the codename Fall Gelb ("Case Yellow") as part of the wider invasion of France, the Netherlands and Luxembourg.

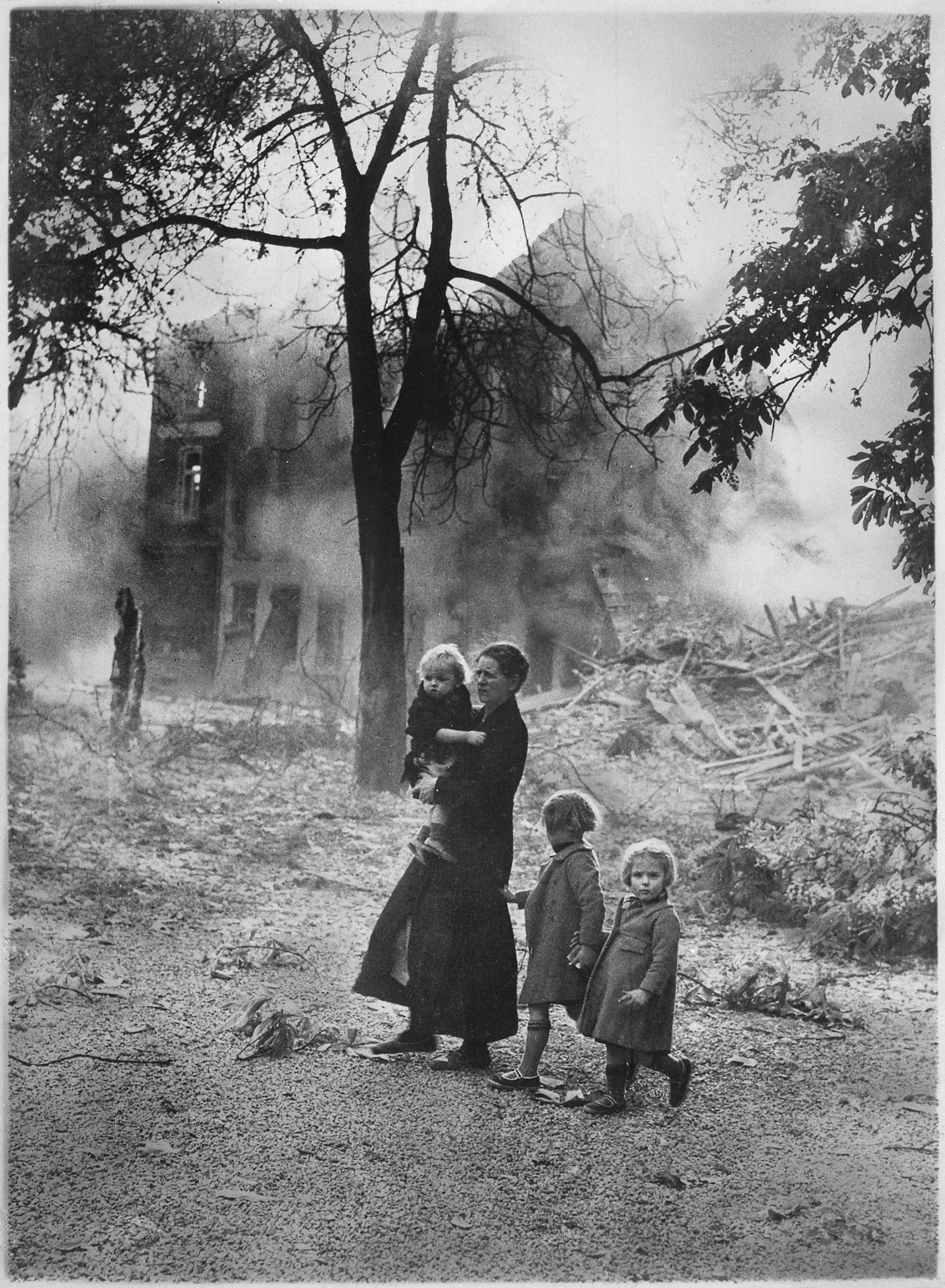
Belgian refugees in 1940

The German invasion triggered a panic amongst Belgian civilians in the path of the advancing German army. By 11 May, the roads leading westwards, away from the fighting, were blocked by refugees, hampering the eastward advance of French and British forces. It is estimated that around two million civilians fled their homes during the campaign. Eventually, the Belgian military held out against German forces for 18 days, against overwhelming odds. On 28 May, forced into a small pocket along the Leie river and after failed attempts to broker a ceasefire on the 27th, the Belgian king and military surrendered unconditionally. Belgian casualties during the campaign numbered some 6,000 killed and 15,850 wounded. Some 112,500 French and Belgian troops escaped to England via Dunkirk but the majority of the Belgian survivors were made prisoners of war and many were not released until the end of the war. Belgian soldiers served in the Royal Air Force and Royal Navy, serving in Belgian-only units as well as in majority-British units. Soldiers from the Belgian Congo fought on the Allied side against the Italians in East Africa.

With the surrender of the Belgian army, the government, led by Hubert Pierlot, fled first to Paris and formed a government in exile in Bordeaux. With the Fall of France, the government transferred to Eaton Square, London. Unlike in the First World War, when most members of the government fled to Le Havre, France, the King stayed in unoccupied Belgium and some other politicians stayed in Britain or the Netherlands, most political leaders sought refuge in London in May 1940. In fact, the Belgian government continued in exile.

In 1940 one of the most pressing concerns facing the Belgian government in exile in London was the situation of Belgian refugees in the United Kingdom. By 1940, at least 15,000 Belgian civilians had arrived in the United Kingdom. Most of them hardly had the chance to take any of their possessions with them. The refugees had originally been dealt with by the British government and in September 1940, pretty much like in December 1914, a Central Service of Refugees was established to provide them with material assistance and to organise employment for Belgians in Britain. More than a century earlier the Battle of Waterloo had originated a cliché among the British that 'the Belgians ran away at Waterloo'. In the First World War mixed feelings had grown in Britain concerning the Belgian refugee men in Britain that did not join the Belgian army. In 1940 the British public was even more sceptical, if not outright hostile to Belgian refugees. The common perception was that Belgium had betrayed the Allies in 1940. A British Mass Observation report noted a "growing feeling against Belgian refugees" in the United Kingdom, closely linked to Leopold III's decision to surrender. The Belgian government in exile was also thoroughly involved in the provision of social, educational and cultural institutions to Belgian refugees. In 1942, the Belgian authorities in London sponsored the creation of the Belgian Institute in London to entertain the Belgian refugee community in London. By 1943, there were also four Belgian schools in Britain with 330 pupils between them, in Penrith, Braemar, Kingston and Buxton. The former St Margaret of Antioch's Church building is situated on Cardigan Road, Headingley, West Yorkshire, England, near Burley Park railway station. It is an example of Late Gothic Revival church architecture, and it was built in the first few years of the twentieth century, being consecrated in 1909. It was built in the Parish of Burley to serve the population of the newly built red-brick terrace houses in the area, part of the late Victorian expansion of Leeds. During the 1940s to the 1960s, the church played host to the Orthodox Liturgy and Communion in Slovak, the Polish Orthodox Church and the Russian Orthodox Church in Exile, as well renting a local house for Belgian refugees during the First World War.

Years after retirement and at the age of 73, Sir William Haldane Porter, a British civil servant who was responsible for the creation of the Aliens Branch of the Home Office (now the UK Immigration Service), was called back to service to supervise the reception of French and Belgian refugees fleeing in 1940 into British channel ports from their occupied countries. For his services Porter was made an officer of the Order of Leopold of Belgium.

After Leopold's surrender, the British press denounced him as "Traitor King" and "King Rat"; the Daily Mirror published a picture of Leopold with the headline "The Face That Every Woman Now Despises'". A group of Belgian refugees in Paris placed a message at King Albert's statue denouncing his son as "your unworthy successor".

== Cultural resonance of Belgian refugees ==
- Christian René, viscount de Duve (1917–2013) was a Nobel Prize-winning Belgian cytologist and biochemist. He was born in Thames Ditton, Surrey, Great Britain, of an estate agent Alphonse de Duve and wife Madeleine Pungs, Belgian refugees during the First World War. They returned to Belgium in 1920.
- The Mysterious Affair at Styles is a detective novel by Agatha Christie. It was written during the War in 1916, and first published by John Lane in the United States in October 1920 and in the United Kingdom by The Bodley Head (John Lane's UK company) on 21 January 1921. Styles was Christie's first published novel, introducing Hercule Poirot, Inspector (later, Chief Inspector) Japp, and Arthur Hastings. Poirot, a Belgian refugee of the Great War, is settling in England near the home of Emily Cavendish, who helped him to his new life. His friend Hastings arrives as a guest at her home. When the woman is killed, Poirot uses his detective skills to solve the mystery. This is also the setting of Curtain, Poirot's last case.
- Keith Monin Stainton (1921–2001) was a British Conservative politician and World War II hero in France. Keith Stainton was born in Kendal, Westmorland, the son of a Kendal butcher and a Belgian refugee his father had met during the First World War.
- Ruth Ellis (1926–1955) was the last woman to be executed in the United Kingdom, after being convicted of the murder of her lover (1955), David Blakely. She was hanged at Holloway Prison, London, by Albert Pierrepoint. Ellis was born in the Welsh seaside town of Rhyl, the third of six children. During her childhood, her family moved to Basingstoke. Her mother, Elisaberta (Bertha) Cothals, was a Belgian refugee; her father, Arthur Hornby, was a cellist from Manchester who spent much of his time playing on Atlantic cruise liners.
- The Duchess of Duke Street is a BBC television drama series set in London between 1900 and 1925. It was created by John Hawkesworth, the former producer of the highly successful ITV period drama Upstairs, Downstairs. It starred Gemma Jones as Louisa Leyton/Trotter, the eponymous "Duchess" who works her way up from servant to renowned cook to the proprietor of the upper-class Bentinck Hotel in Duke Street, St. James's, in London. The story is loosely based on the real-life career of Rosa Lewis (née Ovenden), the "Duchess of Jermyn Street", who ran the Cavendish Hotel in London. The programme lasted for two series totalling 31 episodes, shown between 1976 and 1977. It was nominated for an Emmy Award for Outstanding Limited Series in 1980. The theme music was composed by Alexander Faris. In the episode Your Country Needs You a Belgian refugee features. When Great Britain enters the First World War, Louisa is ultra-patriotic, until Charlie joins the Coldstream Guards. The Major returns to active duty. In exchange for getting Starr reinstated in the Army (while a sergeant in the Sudan Campaign, he caught his young wife with another soldier, and was imprisoned and dishonourably discharged for his subsequent actions), the Major gets Louisa to hire Gaspard, a Belgian refugee.
- The ABC Murders was a BBC television drama based on the book by Agatha Christie and first shown in December 2018. It starred John Malkovich as Hercule Poirot. A plot line not present in the original book gave additional information about Poirot's experiences at the start of WW1, and the drama played on Poirot's status as a refugee in Britain.
