= Joost Berman =

Dutch judge and poet (1793–1855)

- Born: 9 January 1793; Ouwerkerk
- Died: 18 March 1855 (aged 62); Zierikzee
- Education: Leiden University
- Occupations: lawyer, judge, writer, politician
- Years active: 1817–1855
- Spouse: Neeltje Sevenhuizen
- Children: Geertruida, Cornelis I, Cornelia, Johanna, Joost, Alexandrina, Alexander Johan, Abrahamina, Neeltje I, Cornelis II, Stephania, Neeltje II
- Parent(s): Geertruida der Weduwen; Maarten Berman
- Relatives: Simon Berman, Bart Berman, Helen Berman, Thijs Berman

Joost Berman (9 January 1793 – 18 March 1855) was a Dutch lawyer, judge, politician, poet, nonfiction writer, and editor.

== Childhood and education ==
Joost Berman was born in Ouwerkerk as the son of notary Maarten Berman (1769–1832) and Geertruida der Weduwen (1772?–1844). Along with some contemporaries from an evolving rural elite, he managed to complete his studies at the French and Latin schools. When he went on to study law at Leiden University (1814–1817), he was the first of these supposedly "farmer boys" to acquire higher education.

== Legal, literary and political career ==
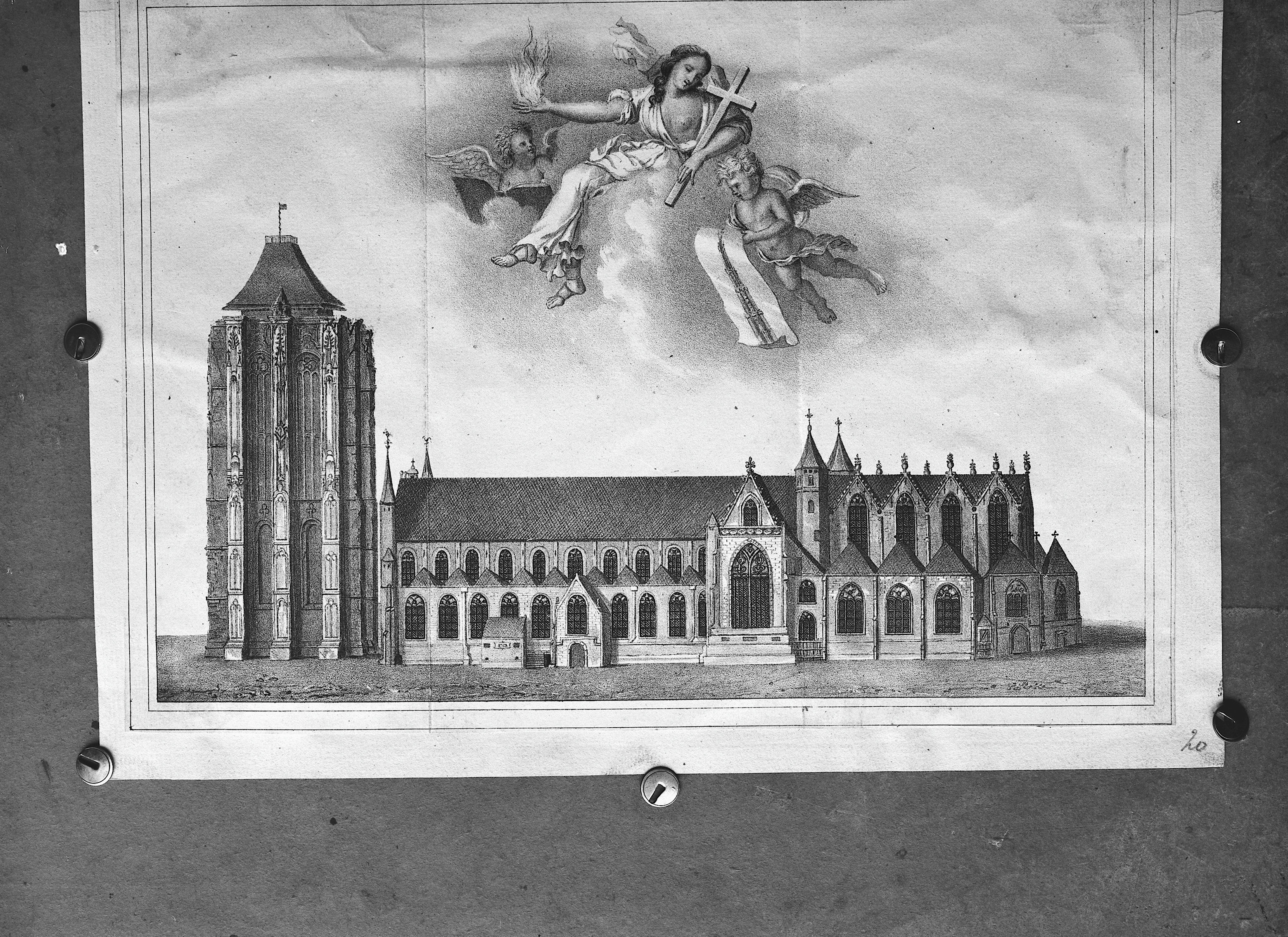
Illustration in Geschiedkundige beschrijving der St. Lievens Monster (1834), written by Joost Berman.

After graduating, Joost Berman worked as an attorney in Zierikzee. Subsequently he was employed by the local court, serving as Assistant Clerk to the Court, Clerk to the Court, Judge of Peace, and from 1838 as Canton Judge. In 1843 Jacobus Boeije succeeded Berman as Canton Judge and Berman served again as Clerk to the Court until 1851.

Joost Berman wrote several works of poetry mobilizing public opinion against the Belgian Revolution, supporting a continued Dutch rule over Belgium. His dissertation and some other nonfiction works were also published. Berman often wrote for magazines. From 1836 to 1847, Berman was co-editor of the "Zeeland People's Almanac" (Dutch: Zeeuwsche Volks-Almanak), alongside Rev. H.M.C. van Oosterzee. This annual series was published by the Zierikzee publisher Johannes van de Velde Olivier, who also published some of Berman's books. While meticulously covering all of Zeeland, both editors lived in Zierikzee, putting the northern island of Schouwen slightly more central in the Almanac than customary in Zeeland-showcasing publications. Publication ceased after Van Oosterzee moved out of Zeeland.

In the elections of 26 September 1848 for the city council of Zierikzee, Joost Berman received 75 votes, just one vote less than the last candidate to receive a 9-year appointment to the council. Berman and the two candidates behind him were selected to fill in places of deceased council members for a "short" term of 6 years. Berman resigned from the Zierikzee court in 1851. There are indications of hardship around or following this decision.

== Personal and death ==
On 29 July 1817, Joost Berman married Neeltje Sevenhuizen (1797–1871) from Zierikzee. In 1823, Berman was released from serving in the Zierikzee's civil guard for health reasons.

Joost and Neeltje Berman had 12 children, 4 of whom died at a young age. Joost Berman's son, Alexander Johan, studied at Joost's alma mater to become the Dutch Reformed minister of Watergang. His grandson, Simon Berman, was the mayor of six municipalities in the Netherlands, the larger of which were Schagen, Bedum, and Alblasserdam.

Joost Berman died in Zierikzee on 18 March 1855, aged 62, after a disease his wife said lasted only 2 days.

== Bibliography ==
=== Nonfiction ===
- 1817 – De poenis secundarum nuptiarum [Latin: Penalties of the marriage] (Lugduni Batavorum)
- 1819 – Iets bij gelegenheid der viering van het éénjarig bestaan van de Vlissingsche afdeeling der Maatschappij tot nut van 't Algemeen
- 1834 – Beschrijving van de St. Lievens Monsterkerk, te Zierikzee, op den 7 october 1832, door brand ten eenemale verwoest (Van de Velde Olivier)
- 1834 – Geschiedkundige beschrijving der St. Lievens Monster of Groote Kerk te Zierikzee [Historical description of the Sint-Lievensmonstertoren or Groote Kerk in Zierikzee] (Le Sage ten Broek)
- 1836 – Troost bij het afsterven van den wel eerw. zeer gel. heer F. Pleyte [Consolation on the passing of the venerable, very educated F. Pleyte] (Van de Velde Olivier)
- 1841 – Ter nagedachtenis van den wel ed. J. de Kanter, Phz. [In memory of the good lord Johan de Kanter, son of Phillipe]
- 1854 – Beschrijving van den hooge watervloed te Zierikzee [Description of the high water flood at Zierikzee] (De Looze)

=== Poetry ===
- 1827 – "Liefde voor het Vaderland" [Love for the Fatherland] contribution to Willem Kroef: Feestrede bij gelegenheid der viering van het derde halve eeuwfeest der verlossing van Zierikzee van de Spanjaarden (Van de Velde Olivier)
- 1830 – Opwekking aan de bewoners van het platte land, tot deelneming in de vrijwillige militaire dienst (Van de Velde Olivier)
- 1830 – Wapenkreet [Call to arms] (Van de Velde Olivier)
- 1831 – Feestdronk toegebragt aan en ingesteld ten behoeve van de gekwetsten in Zeeland (Van de Velde Olivier)
- 1831 – Hulde aan de nagedachtenis van J. C. J. van Speyk (Van de Velde Olivier)
- 1831 – Warschau's val [Warsaw's fall] (Van de Velde Olivier)
- 1831 – contribution to Gerard van Wieringhen Borski: Blik op den verledenen, tegenwoordigen en toekomenden toestand des Vaderlands (Van de Velde Olivier)
- 1833 – Een drietal zangen van den dag [Three songs of the day] (Van de Velde Olivier)
- 1835 – "Aan voorzienigheid", Nederlandsche Muzen-Almanak
- 1836 – "Wat wordt er van de ziel?", 2 pages, Nederlandsche Muzen-Almanak
- 1836 – "Hebt goeden moed", Nederlandsche Muzen-Almanak, pages 221–223
- 1837 – "Een min bekende edelaardige trek van M. Az. de Ruijter", Nederlandsche Muzen-Almanak, pages 66–71
- 1838 – "Aan mijne boeken", 2 pages, Calliope (year book 2). (A. Wynands, Rotterdam)
- 1852 – Hulde toegezongen aan den weled. geb. heere M. C. de Crane (De Looze)

=== Unpublished ===
- 1839 – Brief aan Christianus Petrus Eliza Robidé van der Aa (Letter to Christianus Robidé van der Aa)
