= Simon Berman =

Dutch mayor and Christian anarchist

Mayor of Alblasserdam
- In office June 1914 – March 1, 1923
- Monarch: Wilhelmina of the Netherlands
- Preceded by: Theodoor Cluijsenaar
- Succeeded by: Jan van Scheers

Mayor of Bedum
- In office November 1, 1909 – 1914
- Monarch: Wilhelmina of the Netherlands
- Preceded by: Hieronymus Schleurholts
- Succeeded by: Klaas van Sevenhoven

Mayor of Schagen
- In office April 1894 – November 1900
- Monarchs: Emma of the Netherlands; Wilhelmina of the Netherlands
- Preceded by: Clemens Beels
- Succeeded by: Hendrik Pot

Mayor of Kwadijk Mayor of Middelie Mayor of Warder
- In office January 3, 1890 – 1894
- Monarchs: William III of the Netherlands; Emma of the Netherlands
- Preceded by: Henricus Snijder
- Succeeded by: Jan de Graaff

Personal details
- Born: April 24, 1861 Landsmeer, Netherlands
- Died: October 19, 1934 (aged 73) Haarlem, Netherlands
- Party: none
- Spouse: Johanna Willink (1860-1951)
- Children: Agatha (1890–1978); Alexander (1892–1943); Gerard (1897–1988)
- Parents: Ds. Alexander Johan Berman (1828–1886) (father); Gerarada Blom (1835–1881) (mother)
- Relatives: Joost Berman (grandfather); Bart Berman (grandnephew); Helen (w. of grandnephew); Thijs (great-grandnephew)
- Occupation: Civil servant Mayor; Manager
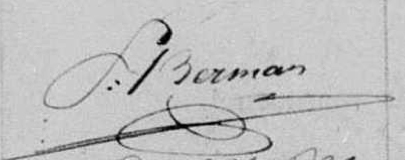
- Signature

Simon Berman (April 24, 1861 – October 19, 1934) was the mayor of Kwadijk, Middelie, Warder, Schagen, Bedum, and Alblasserdam in the Netherlands. He was the first mayor of Kwadijk, Middelie, and Warder to actually live in one of those villages. As a popular mayor of Schagen, he handled a double murder case that drew national media attention and advanced a professional school and regional light rail and canals. In Alblasserdam, he addressed the local impacts of World War I. Berman is also known for his association with Christian anarchism.

== Early life and career ==
Simon Berman was the son of Gerarda Blom (1835–1881) from Alkmaar and Ds. Alexander Johan Berman (1828–1886), a minister in Watergang who hailed from Zierikzee. Simon was raised in a family in financial need as his father, who suffered from poor health, was unable to advance his career after his first appointment as a preacher in a small parish.

In 1885, while working at the municipal secretariat of Purmerend, Simon Berman passed his exam for candidate town clerk. Subsequently he served as town clerk of Barsingerhorn.

== Mayor of Kwadijk, Warder and Middelie ==
In 1890, at the age of 29, Berman was appointed mayor and town clerk of Kwadijk, Warder and Middelie. These three separate municipalities shared one mayor (and were in 1970 united into Zeevang, along with neighboring Oosthuizen and Beets). Simon Berman was the first mayor of Kwadijk, Warder, and Middelie to actually live among his constituents; Previous mayors had lived in Edam. The move of Berman into Kwadijk was accompanied by the movement of the local government office into the village.

During this term he was much engaged in physical improvements to the infrastructure and public buildings of the villages. He also founded a "White Cross" health society.

== Mayor of Schagen ==
=== Installation and a double murder ===
In 1894 Berman was appointed mayor of Schagen. Within months, Schagen and the Netherlands were shocked by the double murder of Jansje Stoel, a 55-year-old widow, and her 17-year-old niece Anna Beiers (or Beijers). Berman headed a committee that would pay 750 guilders, donated by the residents, for the golden tip. As head of the local police, he conducted interrogations. After initially the wrong person was arrested, 17-year-old Klaas Boes was arrested for perpetrating the murders. His mother, who had instigated Klaas, committed suicide. Klaas Boes was sentenced to life imprisonment, later changed to 25 years. Berman was praised for the way he handled the case.

The affair was so famous in the Netherlands that the name "Klaas Boes" was used for years as a negative and fear evoking stereotype.

=== Development of city and region ===
In 1895 Berman found himself in a minority position when the West Friesland Canal Committee set out to plan a canal from Schagen to the Noordhollandsch Kanaal at De Stolpen. Berman argued for a longer trajectory to Kolhorn that was eventually included in the plans as optional only. In the 1930s, both canals were built.

In 1896 Berman was elected chairman of the committee for establishing a tram connection between Alkmaar and Schagen. This tram connection was later built and opened in 1913. It was closed in 1968 and the tracks were removed in 1970.

In 1898 the opening of an agricultural school in Schagen, that Berman had supported, materialized.

== Christian anarchism ==
Berman resigned as mayor of Schagen in 1900, explaining that his ideology conflicted with some of his functions. He was appointed administrator for the Christian anarchist publishing house De Vrede in The Hague. In 1902 the publishing house moved to a related commune in Blaricum, where members grew their own produce, ran a bakery, engaged in carpentering, and shared their belongings. Berman continued to manage publications, lived outside the commune, in nearby Laren, (perhaps shortly inside) and did not transfer his savings.

The printing group moved to Amersfoort in 1903, after Berman had resigned that same year from its management. In 1904 Berman lived on the Asterstraat 25 in Hilversum and became secretary of the society Ons Huis, part of the Christian-anarchist network. While a former mayor joining the Christian anarchist movement was a source of pride for the group, conservative press took joy in the gradual unraveling of his anarchist interests. The Bermans remained in Hilversum until 1909.

== Mayor of Bedum ==
From 1909 to 1914 Simon Berman was mayor of Bedum.

While mayor of Bedum, Berman undertook an initiative to regulate skating traffic throughout the province of Groningen. He also tried to expedite tram transportation in the province. Impacts of both initiatives were limited at best.

== Mayor of Alblasserdam ==
Shortly after Berman was installed in 1914 as Mayor of Alblasserdam, World War I started. While the Netherlands remained neutral, the local government of Alblasserdam and its mayor kept busy with such impacts as 60 Belgian refugees within the municipal boundaries. An ad-hoc municipal fund for the unemployed was established.

In controversial measures, formally related to the war but perceived to be related to Berman's religious/political ideology, he closed the public houses of Alblasserdam on Sundays and experimented with other limitations on alcohol sales.

After being ill for a while, Berman retired in 1923, just short of turning 62.

== Personal life, family and death ==
Simon Berman married Johanna Diderica Helena Willink on July 11, 1889 in Bennebroek. Agatha was a year his senior and survived him by 17 years. Simon's brother, Alexander Johan Berman, a notary in Nieuwendam, was married to Johanna's sister Agatha Willink.

Simon and Johanna Berman had a daughter, Agatha Johanna (1890–1978), and two sons, Alexander Johan (1892–1943) and Gerard (1897–1988). Alexander Berman initially followed in his father's footsteps when he became Town Clerck of Wijdenes at the age of 20, then filled a similar position in Semarang, Dutch East Indies. Back in the Netherlands he promoted medical help for the Dutch Indies as PR chief of the Simavi foundation." Gerard Berman, who had established himself as a photographer in Haarlem, made Simon Berman's portrait photo in September 1927.

Simon Berman died in Haarlem on 19 October 1934, at the age of 73. He was buried at the public cemetery in Heemstede.

== See also ==
- Anarchism in the Netherlands
