= Kwadijk =

- Village
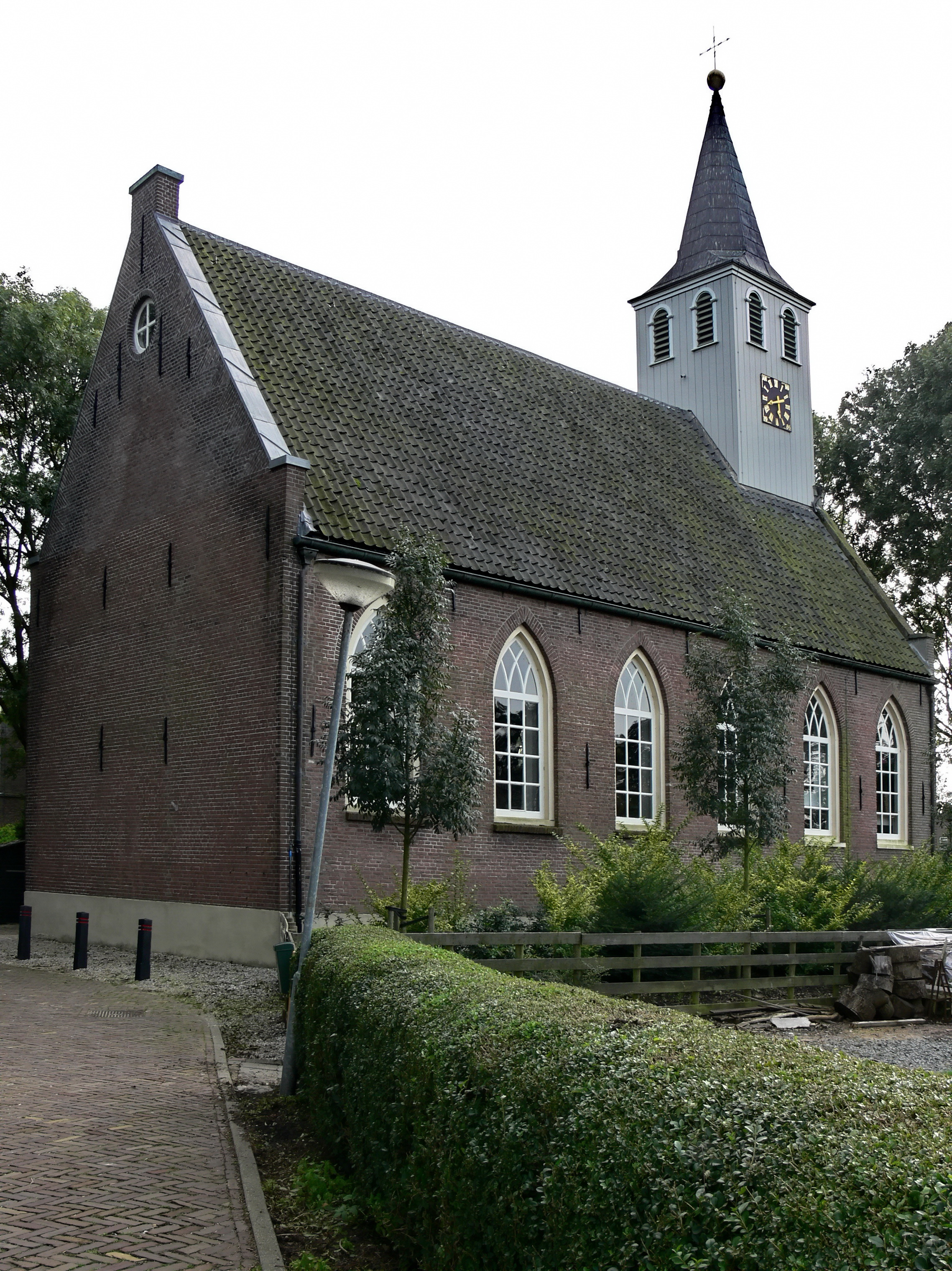

- Coat of arms

- Location in the Netherlands Location in the province of North Holland in the Netherlands
- Coordinates: 52°31′39″N 4°58′52″E
- Country: Netherlands
- Province: North Holland
- Municipality: Edam-Volendam

Area
  - Total: 5.71 km^{2} (2.20 sq mi)
- Elevation: −1.2 m (−3.9 ft)

Population (2021)
  - Total: 760
  - Density: 130/km^{2} (340/sq mi)
- Time zone: UTC+1 (CET)
  - Summer (DST): UTC+2 (CEST)
- Postal code: 1471
- Dialing code: 0299

Kwadijk is a village and former municipality in the northwest Netherlands. It is a part of the municipality of Edam-Volendam in the Dutch province of North Holland. Kwadijk is located about 20 kilometres (12 mi) north of Amsterdam and about 3 kilometres (1.9 mi) north of Purmerend.

== History ==
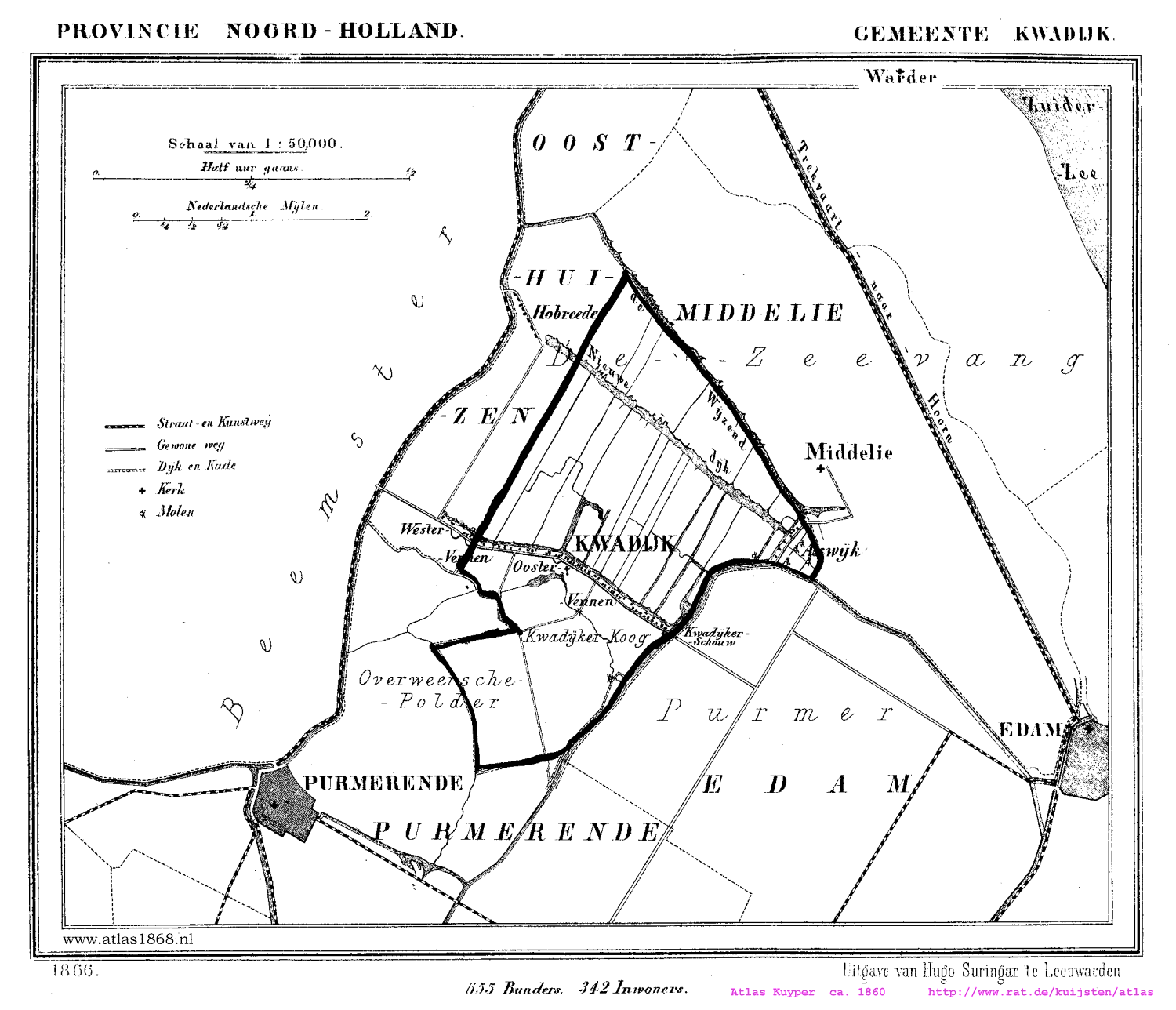
Map from around 1868

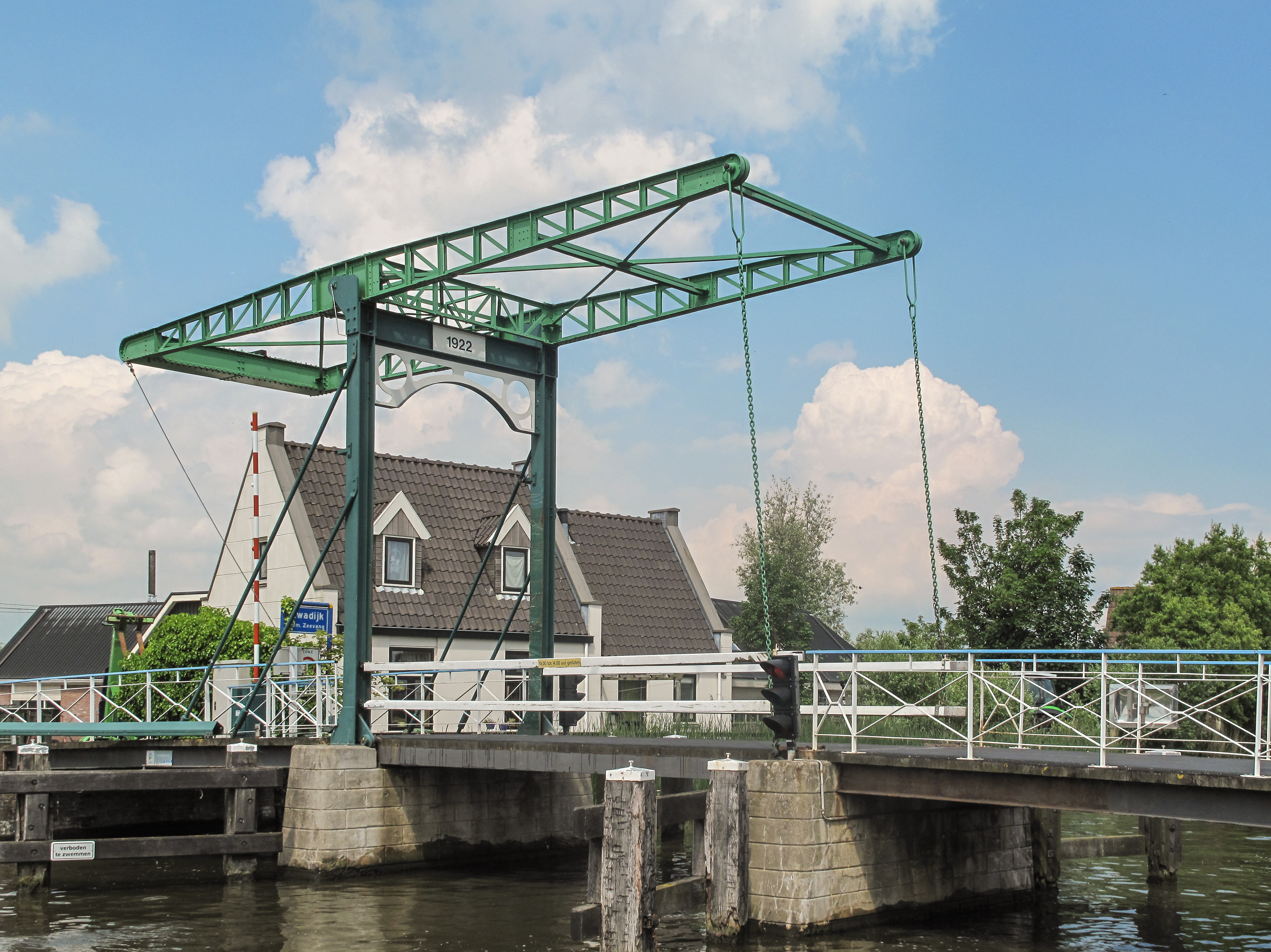
Kwadijk, drawing bridge

At least from 1414 there was a church in Kwadijk. That year the inhabitants of Kwadijk became "citizens" of Edam, from where the village was largely controlled. Many of the inhabitants of Kwadijk had relocated from the abandoned village Drei or Verdrey to the north of current Kwadijk between the Nieuwendijk and the Wijzend (near present-day Hobrede). At least until 1567 the Kwadijkers maintained the old graveyard of Drei.

In the 16th and 17th centuries, in addition to livestock and fishery, inhabitants also received income from through sailing industry. The old cruciform church from the beginning of the 16th century was replaced by the present church of Kwadijk, which dates back to 1835.

On January 1, 1812 both Kwadijk and Warder were added to the municipality of Middelie, however on May 1, 1817 all three emerged as independent municipalities. Yet even while independent, all three municipalities shared one mayor and were administered from the nearby city of Edam. This situation changed in 1890, when at the age of 29, Simon Berman was appointed mayor of Kwadijk, Middelie, and Warder. Berman moved the mayor's residence and local government office for the three municipalities into Kwadijk so he could live and provide services among his constituents.

On May 20, 1884 a railway station was opened in Kwadijk, on the line Enkhuizen-Zaandam. Originally the station was known as Kwadijk-Edam. From May 15, 1935 it was named Kwadijk. Not for long, as the station was closed on May 15, 1938. An occasional train would still make a stop at Kwadijk until 1941. Between May 1, 1906 and May 15, 1933 one could travel from "Kwadijk-Edam" railway station to Volendam and Edam by a steam-propelled tram, operated by the Hollandsche IJzeren Spoorweg-Maatschappij. Some of the tram's right-of-way is still distinguishable in the landscape between Kwadijk and Edam. After its final closure, the structure of Kwadijk's railway station served as residential building, art studio, and warehouse. In 2010 the building was rehabbed into a modern office building, while preserving historical elements.

In 1925 the water tower of Kwadijk was built by the provincial water supply company of North Holland. It was designed by the architect B.F. van Niefelt. The tower later became a residential structure. It is a national monument of the Netherlands.

In 1970 the municipality of Kwadijk merged into the new municipality of Zeevang. As part of the reorganization, the hamlet of Verloren Einde was added to the village of Kwadijk.
