= Piet Paaltjens =

Dutch minister and writer (1835–1894)

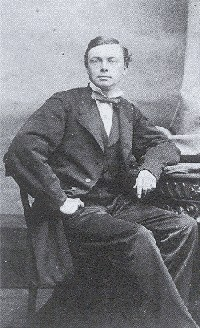
François Haverschmidt.

François Haverschmidt, also written as HaverSchmidt (14 February 1835 in Leeuwarden – 19 January 1894 in Schiedam), was a Dutch minister and writer, who wrote prose under his own name but remains best known for the poetry published under the pen name of Piet Paaltjens. Following his wife's death, he suffered from depression. He committed suicide in 1894.

== Life and career ==
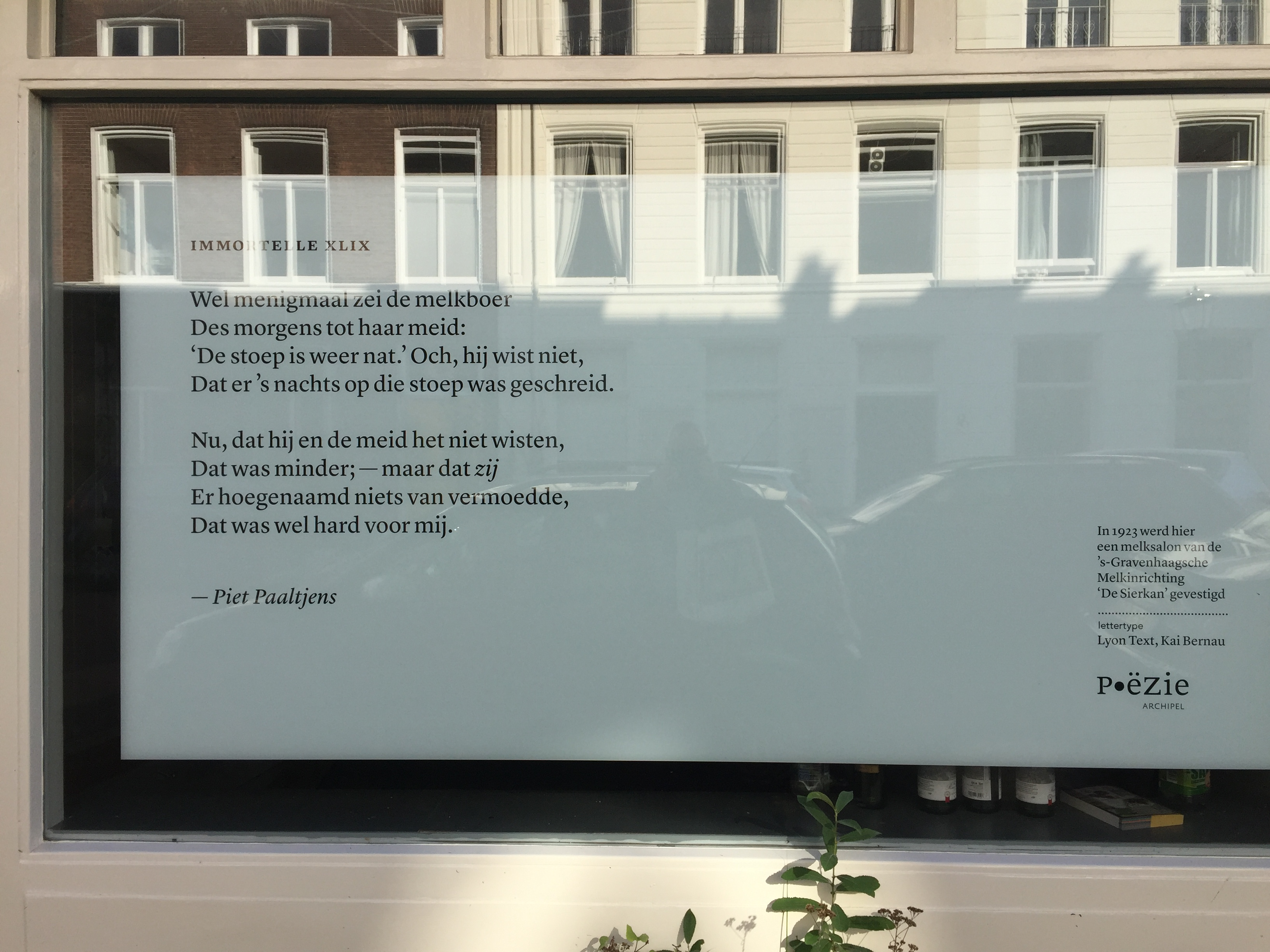
Poem by Paaltjens (Immortelle XLIX in a window in The Hague (2019)

Haverschmidt studied Calvinist theology at Leiden University, graduating in 1858. He successively became minister in Foudgum, Den Helder and Schiedam.

During his student days, he had some of his poetry published in student magazines under the pen name of Piet Paaltjens, around whom a playful but elaborate mystification was created as Haverschmidt kept his poetry separate from his "serious" prose and sermons, not unlike Nicolaas Beets.

He became a prime suspect for being the anonymous author of the Oera Linda Book, the inferred reason being a practical joke (a parody of the Bible to lampoon fundamentalist Christians). However, many of his contemporaries believed the book to be authentic. This would have prevented Haverschmidt and his collaborators (if they were indeed the authors of the supposedly millennia-old text) from unmasking their hoax, which consequently completely backfired.

Haverschmidt became progressively more depressed, especially after his wife's death in 1891, and ultimately committed suicide in 1894.

== Bibliography ==
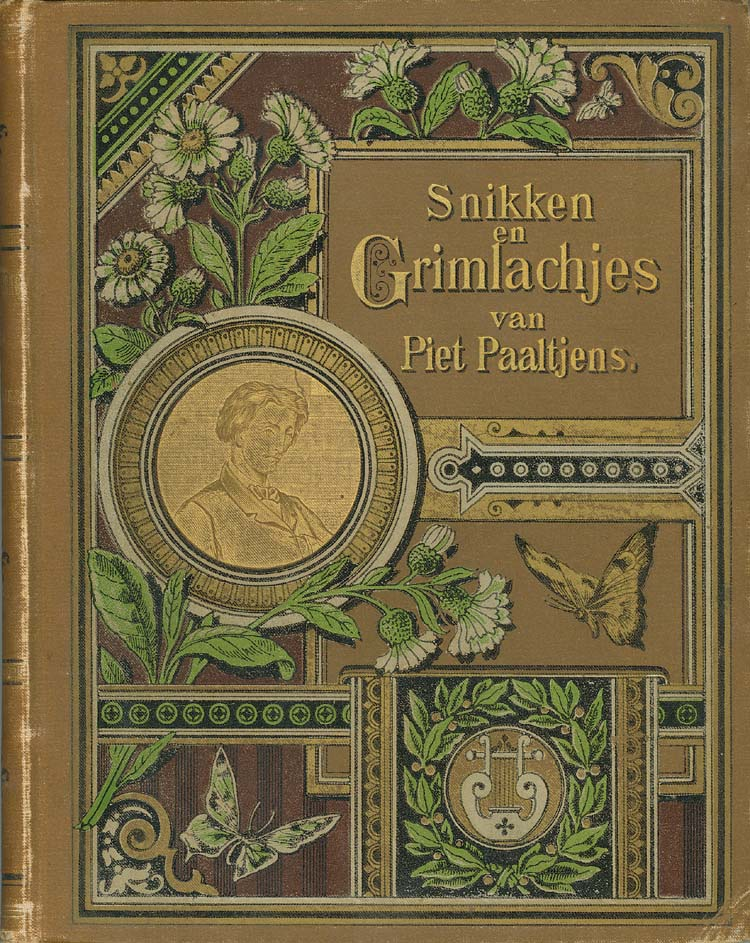
Snikken en grimlachjes (poetry)

=== As Piet Paaltjens ===
- Snikken en grimlachjes: poëzie uit den studententijd ("Sobs and Bitter Grins: Student-Days Poetry", 1867) ISBN 90-214-9765-4

=== As François Haverschmidt ===
- Familie en kennissen ("Relatives and Acquaintances", short stories, 1876)
- Uit geest en gemoed ("From Mind and Heart", sermons, 1894)
- Uit den studententijd in Alexander Johan Berman: Landjuweel

=== As both ===
- Nagelaten snikken van Piet Paaltjens: poëzie en proza, tekeningen en curiosa uit de nalatenschap van François HaverSchmidt ("Posthumous Sobs of Piet Paaltjens: Poetry and Prose, Drawings and Curiosities from François HaverSchmidt's Estate", early poetry and prose and Paaltjens "outtakes", 1961)

=== English translation ===
A section of Snikken en grimlachjes has been translated into English by Jacob Lowland as Everlastings (1850–1852) (Amsterdam: Aarts, 1982)
