= Snikken en grimlachjes =

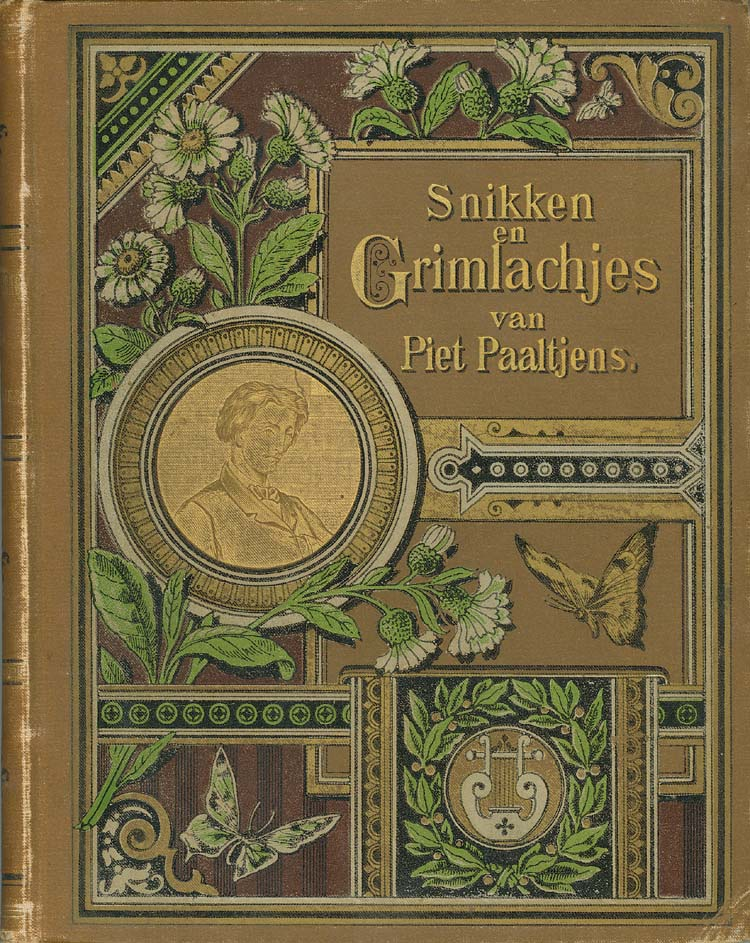
Cover of the sixth print of Snikken en grimlachjes

Snikken en grimlachjes is the best-known work of Piet Paaltjens, a fictional poet created by Dutch poet and minister François Haverschmidt (1835–1894). Originally, it contained a collection of 24 poems. It appealed to a large audience, possibly due to its humoristic, melancholic-romantic tone, or maybe due to the poetry missing a "moral purpose", as Haverschmidt himself stated in the preface to the first edition. Typical for Paaltjens' poetry is the combination of romantic clichés (unrequited love, grand emotions, the natural world), irony, and crude reality.

== Structure ==
The book consists of the following parts.

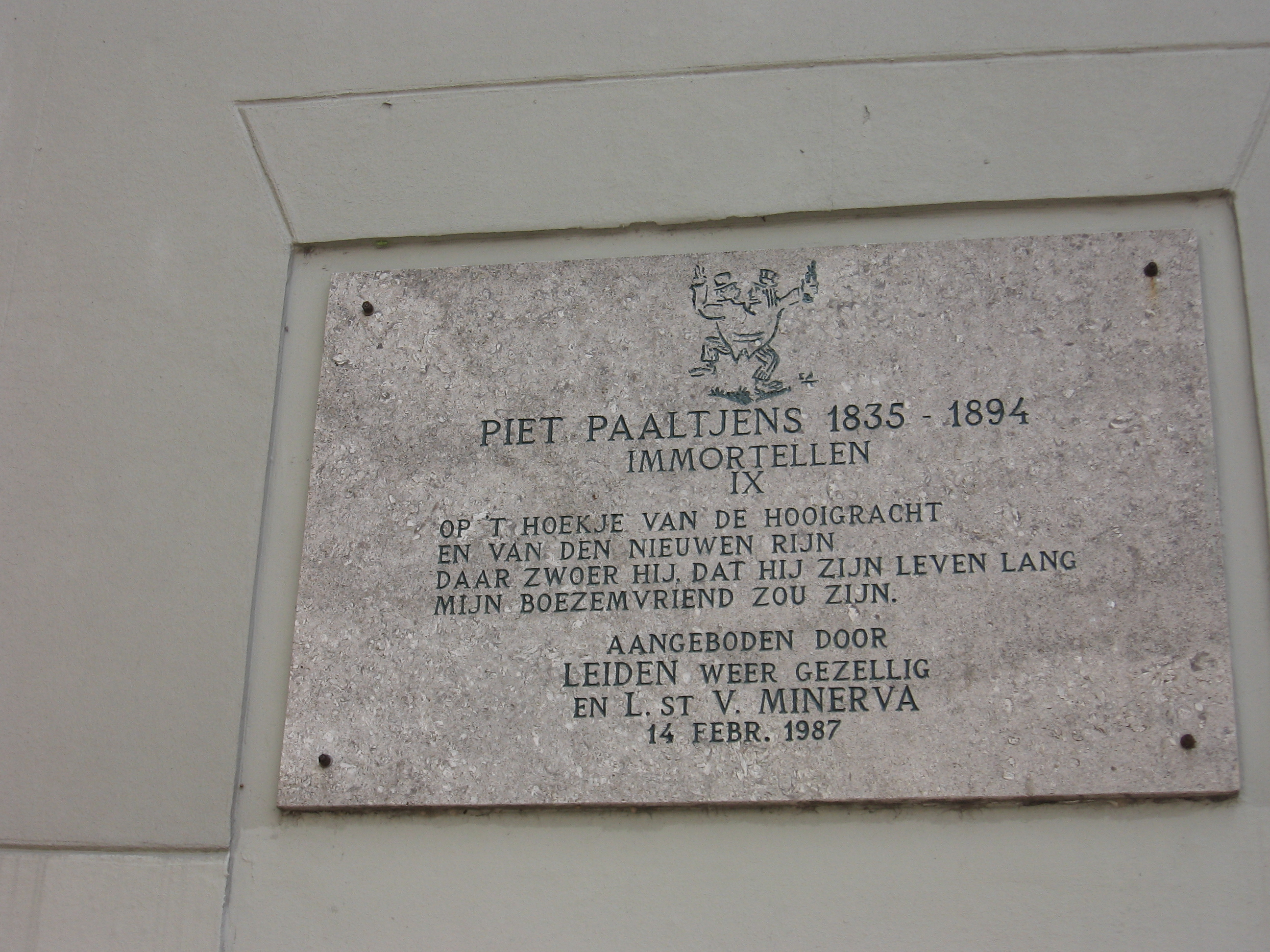
Plaque at the Hooigracht in Leiden, showing text from Immortellen

- De bleeke jongeling (The pale youngster), a stand-alone poem;
- Immortellen 1850–1852 (Immortals), thirteen short poems. The numbering suggests that they are taken from a much larger collection;
- Tijgerlelies 1851–1853 (Tiger lilies), four poems about girls; and
- Romancen (Romances), six narrative poems, three of which are of considerable length.

== Editions ==
During Haverschmidt's life, six prints were published. In the preface of the first edition, printed in 1867 by Schiedam-based publisher Roelants, Haverschmidt gives a short profile of Paaltjens, which is contemptuous towards the work: "I also cannot find any moral purpose in it."

In the second edition, the preface is written from Paaltjens' point of view, in the form of a letter to the publisher. Here Snikken en Grimlachjes is described as "rhymes of my youth" and the author claims that he burnt poems of later date, "to warm a kettle of bishop". Paaltjens claims he has finally renounced the sombre, bitter lyric of the collection.

The preface for the fourth edition is again written by Haverschmidt, and instead of contempt, he now shows great enthousiasm for the poems. This edition also saw the addition of Latin translations of Immortellen I and LXXII, written by his friend Adriaan van Wessem ("Adrianus Arena Ictus").

The fifth edition (1881) got an appendix, which is introduced by the publisher, claiming "Paaltjens has permitted us to add the following poem to his Snikken en Grimlachjes." The poem is titled Reünie ("Reunion"); it was written on the occasion of a lustrum celebration of Paaltjens' Leiden student society. The appendix also contains a new Latin translation by Van Wessem: Immortelle LX.

The sixth and last edition that was published during Haverschmidt's life appeared in 1889. Latin translations of Immortellen XXV and XCVI, and De zelfmoordenaar ("The self-murderer") were added to the appendix, again provided by Van Wessem. New in this edition are four poems that are dedicated to Van Wessem: Aan Adrianus Arena Ictus. Een paar slotsnikken ("To Adrianus Arena Ictus. A few closing sobs.")

Snikken en grimlachjes was reprinted many times after Haverschmidt's death. Roelants, the original publisher, issued a seventh (1895), eighth (1904), ninth (1908), tenth (undated) and eleventh (undated) edition. When the rights to the book expired in 1944, publisher Oceanus from The Hague immediately published a new edition, the preface and explanations of which were written by K.H. de Raaf. The book has since been published by many different publishing houses.

== Trivia ==
- The title in Dutch is a play on words meaning 'sobs and grim smiles'. A 'glimlach' is just a smile, so 'snikken en glimlachjes' would contrast positive and negative emotions. With 'grimlachjes' instead of 'glimlachjes', the title takes a turn for the cynical.
- The Immortellen were translated into English by Jacob Lowland – a pseudonym of James Holmes – as Piet Paaltjens' Everlastings (1850–1852): An Integral Englishing of the Immortellen (Amsterdam: Aarts, 1982).
- De zelfmoordenaar (The Self-Murderer), one of the romancen, is a satire about a romantic poet and is possibly Paaltjens' most famous poem. Eventually, Haverschmidt would take his own life.
- Paaltjens' work inspired many artists. Drs. P, for instance, wrote a reply to the poem Aan Rika (To Rika).

== Sources ==
- Nederlandse literatuur – Geschiedenis, bloemlezing en theorie – J.A. Dautzenberg ISBN 90-208-0265-8
- Piet Paaltjens "Snikken en grimlachjes": Poëzie uit den studententijd (delivered by Rob Nieuwenhuys) ISBN 9025341950
