= Watergang =

- Village
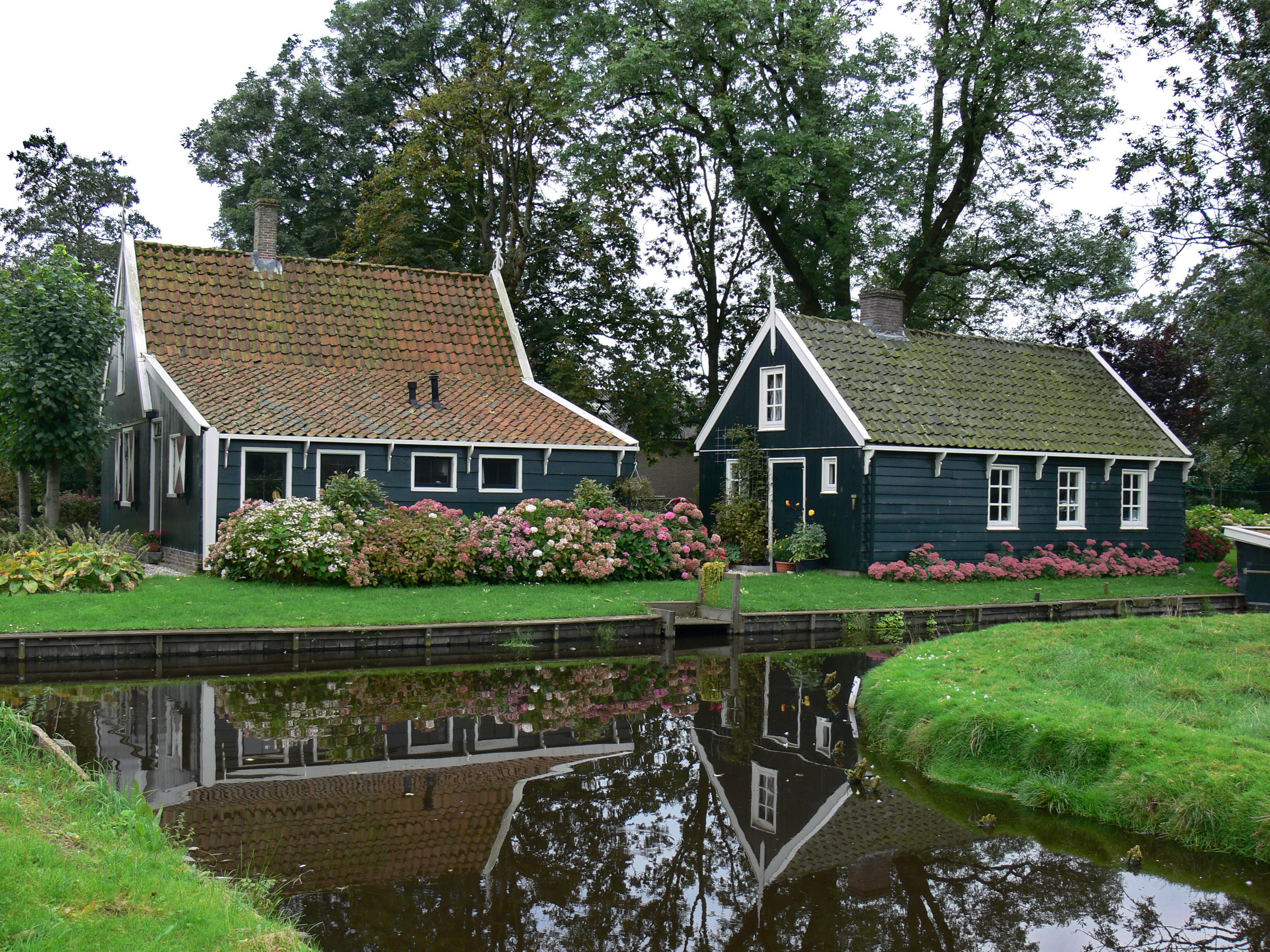
- Houses in Watergang

- Location in the Netherlands Location in the province of North Holland in the Netherlands
- Coordinates: 52°26′N 4°57′E
- Country: Netherlands
- Province: North Holland
- Municipality: Waterland

Area
  - Total: 4.65 km^{2} (1.80 sq mi)
- Elevation: −0.9 m (−3.0 ft)

Population (2021)
  - Total: 570
  - Density: 120/km^{2} (320/sq mi)
- Time zone: UTC+1 (CET)
  - Summer (DST): UTC+2 (CEST)
- Postal code: 1454
- Dialing code: 020

Watergang (literally "water passage") is a village in the northwest Netherlands. It is located in the municipality of Waterland, North Holland, about seven kilometres (four miles) north of Amsterdam, on the east bank of the Noordhollandsch Kanaal.

The village was first mentioned in 1343 as "van waterganghe", and means canal. It refers to the waterway between Monnickendam and Amsterdam. The canal developed during the peat excavation of the 12th century, and Watergang developed as a linear settlement along the canal. The Dutch Reformed church dates from 1642 and was restored in 1832.

== People from Watergang ==
- Alexander Johan Berman, Dutch Reformed Minister of Watergang
- Simon Berman, Watergang-born mayor of Schagen, Bedum, and Alblasserdam

== Gallery ==
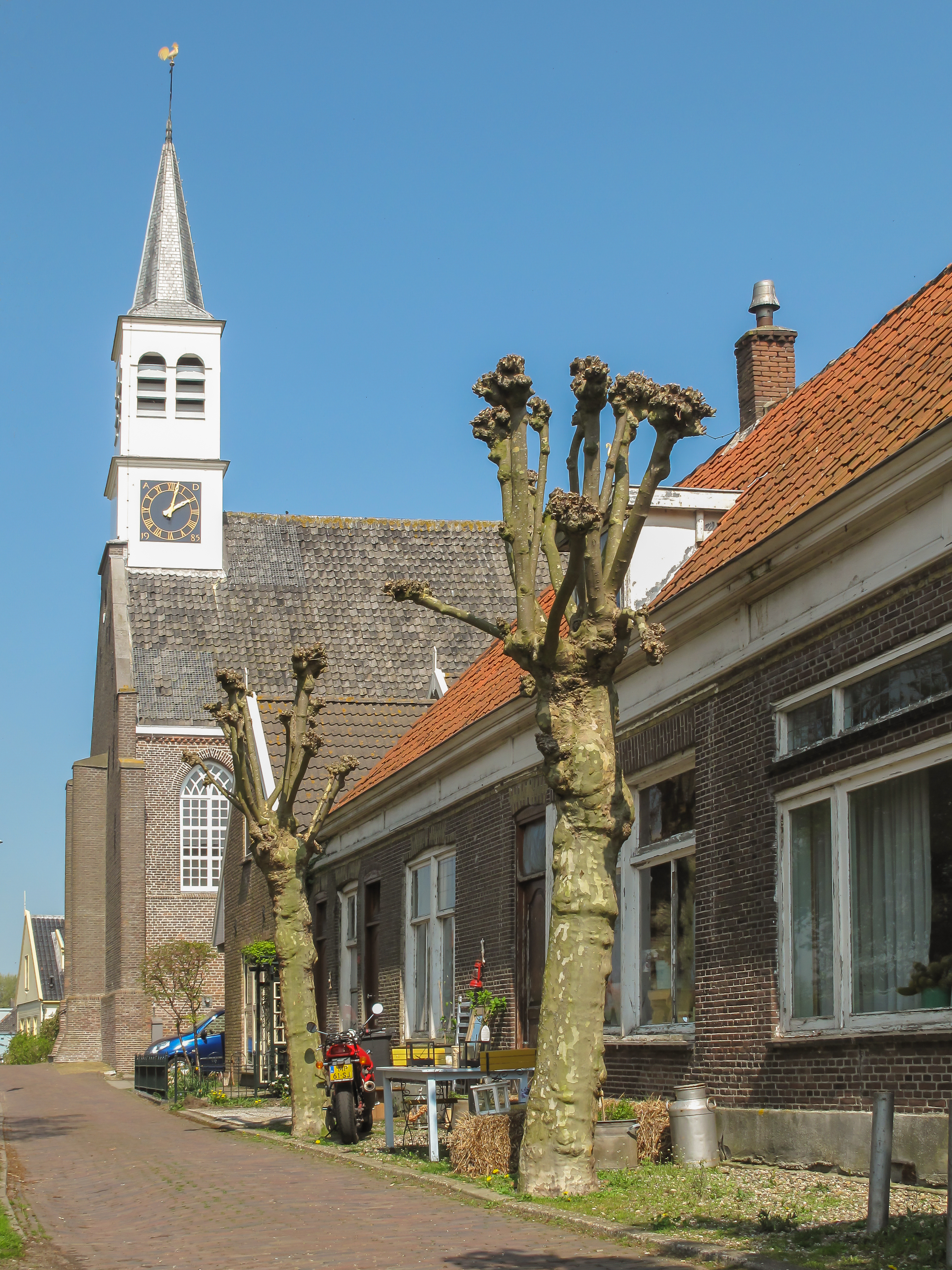
Watergang, church in the street

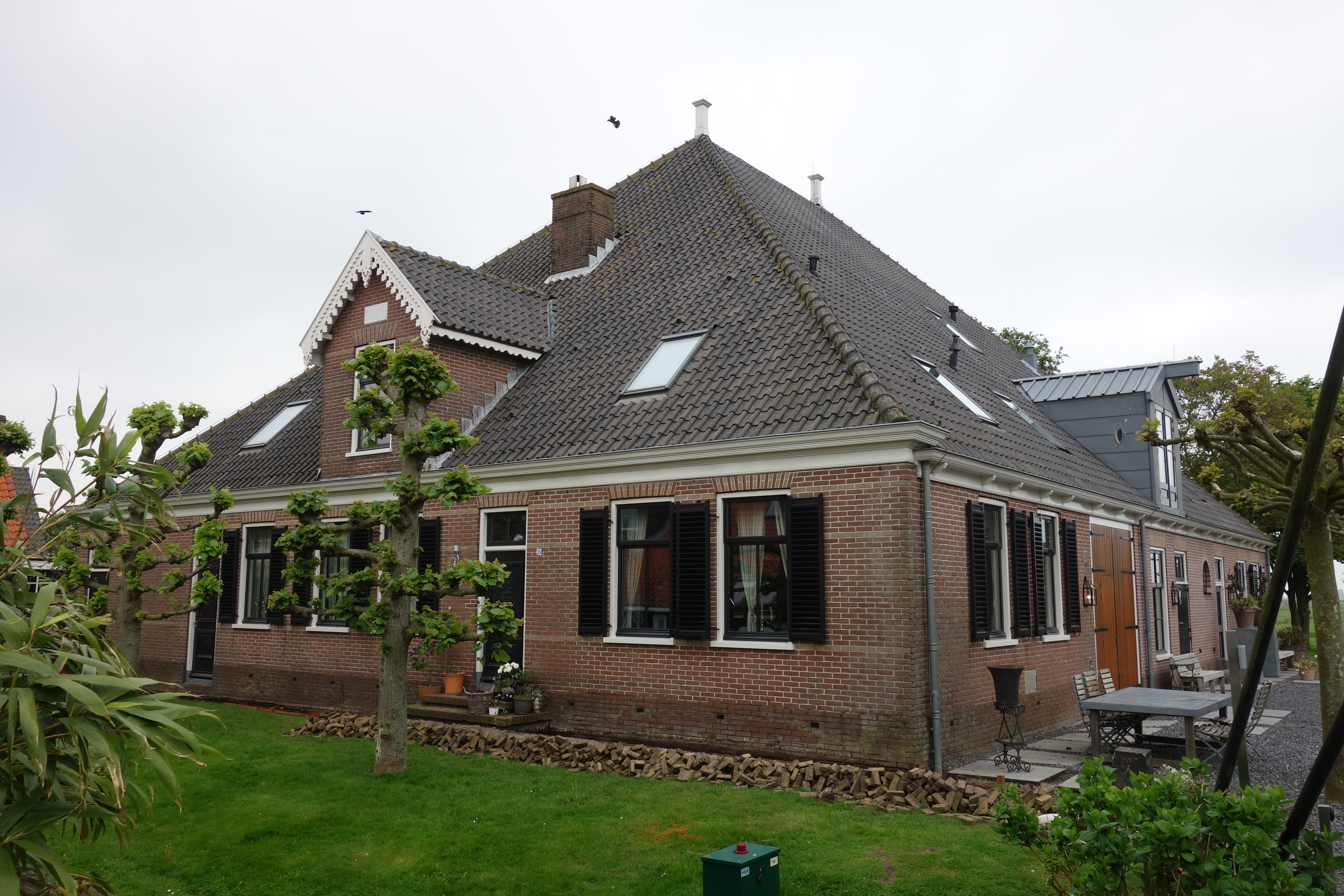
Farm in Watergang
