= Johannes van de Velde Olivier =

Johannes van de Velde Olivier (4 July 1795–30 November 1845) was a publisher, printer, bookbinder, and bookseller in Zierikzee. Among the Zierikzee authors he published were judge/poet Joost Berman, the educator Gerard van Wieringhen Borski, and lawyer/politician Willem Kroef.

Johannes van de Velde Olivier was born 4 July 1795 in Serooskerke, Schouwen-Duiveland. He married Cornelia Gerardina Bal Snijders. Their son Marinus Martinus (born 1843) sold and published books in Amsterdam. Their son Frans Johannes Olivier (1829–1887) sold art in Brussels. Johannes van de Velde Oliver died 30 November 1845 in Zierikzee.
