= Gerard van Wieringhen Borski =

Dutch educator, academic, and linguist

Gerard van Wieringhen Borski (29 January 1800 in Vleuten — 2 February 1869 in Delft) was a Dutch educator, academic, and linguist. His nonfiction books covered the domains of linguistics, math, history, and sociology.

== Books ==
- Disputatio historica inauguralis, de Phoenicum Coloniis (J. Altheer, 1825)
- Blik op den verledenen, tegenwoordigen en toekomenden toestand des vaderlands (Van de Velde Olivier, 1831; with a poem by Joost Berman)
- Handleiding tot de mythologie : voor het onderwys in de gymnasien (Van de Velde Olivier, 1837; Leepel, 1854)
- Aan mijne stadgenooten bij de herstelling van het stedel. gymnasium (Amsterdam, 1839)
- Redevoeringen over het verband tusschen de Nederlandsche letterkunde en het Nederlandsche volkskarakter (Delft, 1843)
- Handleiding tot het aanvankelijk onderwijs in de cijferkunst (Du Mortier en Zoon, 1844)
- Geschiedenis des vaderlands: een leesboek in XLVIII afdeelingen (Ten Brink & De Vries, 1845)
- Geschiedenis der Israëliten: een leesboek in XLVIII afdeelingen (J. de Rooij, 1846)
- Handleiding tot de theoretische beoefening van den Nederlandschen prozastijl (Bohn, 1848)
- Wegwijzer bij de zinsontleding (Delft, 1852)
- Beknopt leerboek voor het aanvankelijk onderwijs in de moedertaal (Koster, 1853)
- Het grondig taalonderwijs verdedigd tegen Dr. J. Pijnappel Gz. van de Delftsche Akademie (Delft, 1855)
- Handleiding voor de praktische oefening in de zinsontleding (H. Koster, 1856)
- Vier punten, rakende het ontwerp van wet tot regeling van het middelbaar onderwijs (H. Koster, 1862)
- Met Oranje, Nederland; door Oranje, de Nederlandsche volksvrijheid (H.A.M. Roelants, 1864; Gebrs. Koster, 1875)
