= Willem Kroef =

Dutch politician

Willem Johan Pieter Kroef (Vlissingen, 31 March 1793 — Zierikzee, 1 August 1853) was a Dutch politician.

== Career ==
Kroef studied Roman and contemporary law at Utrecht University. He obtained his PhD in 1811. Kroef became an attorney in Zierikzee and from 1819 city manager.

During the years 1848–1853 he was a member of the provincial executive council of Zeeland, which appointed him as a temporary member of the Dutch House of Representatives during the year 1848. Kroef tried to get elected to the House of Representatives in the elections of 1850 and 1852, but to no avail.

== Family ==
Willem Kroef's father was Johan Cornelis Kroef, public prosecutor in Vlissingen, bailiff in Zierikzee and Brouwershaven, and prosecutor in Zierikzee. His mother was Petronella Susanna de Timmerman. He married Maria Wilhelmina Fitzner, with whom he had 7 children kinderen. After Maria died, Kroef married Adrienne Gertrude de Klopper, with whom he had 2 more children.

== Publications ==
- Feestrede, uitgesproken bij gelegenheid der viering van het derde halve eeuwfeest, ter gedachtenis der verlossing van de stad Zierikzee en eilanden uit de Spaansche dwingelandij, in de openbare vergadering des departements der Maatschappij: Tot Nut van 't Algemeen, afdeeling Zierikzee, op den 3 November 1826. De liefde voor het vaderland, beschouwd als grondslag van den roem en grootheid der Nederlanden (publisher: Van de Velde Olivier, 1827; with a contribution by Joost Berman)
