= Alexander Johan Berman =

Ds. Alexander Johan Berman
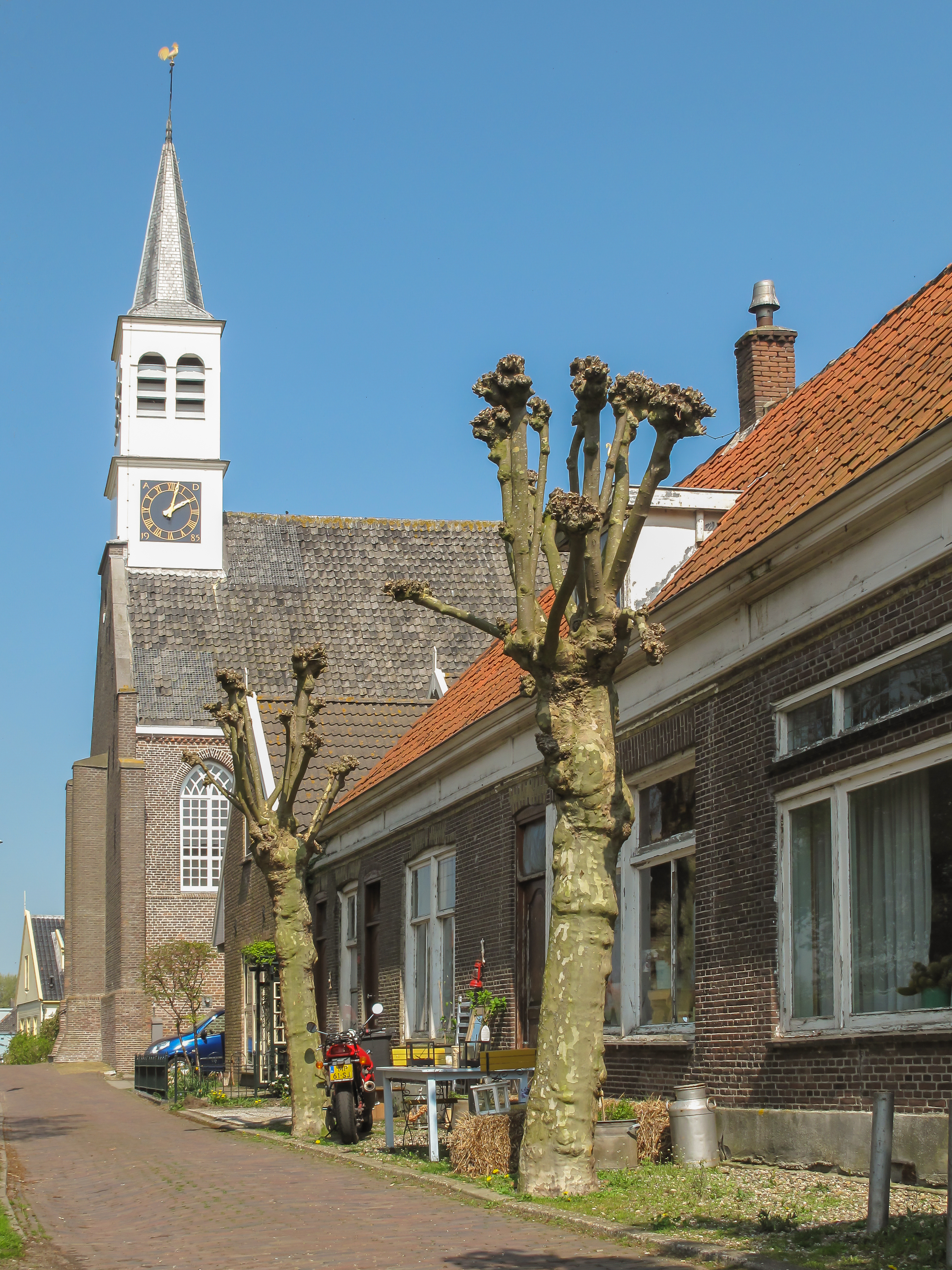
- The Watergang church, where Berman served
- Born: September 18, 1828; Zierikzee, Netherlands
- Died: February 14, 1886 (aged 57); Amsterdam, Netherlands
- Years active: 1854–1882
- Spouse: Gerarda Blom (1835–1881)
- Children: Willemina, Simon, Joost, Johan Alexander
- Parent(s): Joost Berman (1793–1855); Neeltje Sevenhuysen (1797–1871)
- Relatives: Bart Berman, Helen Berman, Thijs Berman
- Religion: Protestant Christianity
- Church: Dutch Reformed Church
- Congregations served: Nijmegen (1854–1856); Watergang (16 November 1856–31 December 1882)

Ds. Alexander Johan Berman (17 September 1828 in Zierikzee–14 February 1886 in Amsterdam) was a Dutch Reformed minister of Watergang, an author and, in his early retirement, an archivist. As an author, he wrote mostly literary criticism, and, in his younger years, poetry. He published an anthology with works by authors of his era.

== Life ==
A. J. Berman studied at Leiden University, the alma mater of his father, judge and writer Joost Berman. Upon graduation Alexander Johan became an 1854 assistant minister in Nijmegen.

In 1856 Berman was appointed minister at the Dutch Reformed Church of Watergang. Sunday, 16 November was the official start of his work. On 26 November 1857 Berman married in Alkmaar with Gerarda Blom. They had 4 children. Since Watergang was a small community and Berman, who suffered from a lung condition, did not progress to a larger community, the family struggled financially. A friend from university, the author and literary critic Conrad Busken Huet, initiated an anthology through which money was collected for the family. The anthology Landjuweel, set up a series of which only one volume was published, was edited by Berman. The minister's wife died in 1881, aged 45.

Due to his health condition, Berman retired in 1883, just 2 years after his silver jubilee in Watergang. Next, he worked at the city archives of Amsterdam and died in that city in 1886. Two of his children, Simon and Johan Alexander, enjoyed successful careers as a mayor and notary respectively, after training on the job.

== Bibliography ==
=== Books ===
- 1854: Asters. Dichtbundeltje, bijeenverzameld door eenige HH. Studenten te Leyden, Utrecht en Deventer, with J.E. Banck Jr., Didymus, J.P.N. Land, and A.J.C. Kremer. Leiden: Jacobus Hazenberg Corns Zoon. (coauthor)
- 1878: Landjuweel: proza en poëzie", Volume 1. Amsterdam: G.L. Funke. (editor)
- 1879: Isabella von Drücker: Een verwaarloosd kleinood. From German. Utrecht: Gebroeders van der Post. (translator)

=== Articles ===
- 1870 – "Eene onderwijzing van den Zoon des menschen aangaande den Rustdag" in De Christelijke Huisvriend 11.
- 1870 – "Weemoed", ibid.
