= Alblas =

Alblas is a Dutch surname. Notable people with the surname include:

- Aart Alblas (1918–1944), Dutch navy officer
- Norbert Alblas (born 1994), Dutch footballer
- Ton Alblas (1940–2015), Dutch politician
