= Willink =

Willink is a Dutch toponymic surname. Notable people with the surname include:

- Abraham Willink (1920–1998), Dutch-Argentine entomologist
- Arthur Willink (1850–1913), British theologian and clergyman
- Carel Willink (1900–1983), Dutch painter
- Charles Willink (1929–2009), English classical scholar, teacher and baronet, son of Henry
- Henry Willink PC, MC, KC (1894–1973), British politician, public servant and baronet
- Jocko Willink (born 1971), American podcaster, author and retired United States Navy SEAL
- John Willink (1858–1927), Anglican Dean
- Mathilde Willink (1938–1977), Dutch socialite and wife of Carel Willink
- Wilhelm Ferdinand Willink van Collen (1847–1881), Dutch painter who funded an arts award
- Willem Willink (1750–1841), Dutch merchant, investor in the Holland Land Company and the Louisiana Purchase
- Herman Tjeenk Willink (born 1942), Dutch politician
- Joram Willink (born 1975), Dutch film producer

== See also ==
- Willink, New York, former town in Western New York, USA, named after Willem Willink
- The Willink School, Berkshire school
- Willink baronets of Dingle Bank in the City of Liverpool, a title in the Baronetage of the United Kingdom
