= Alblasserdam =

- Municipality
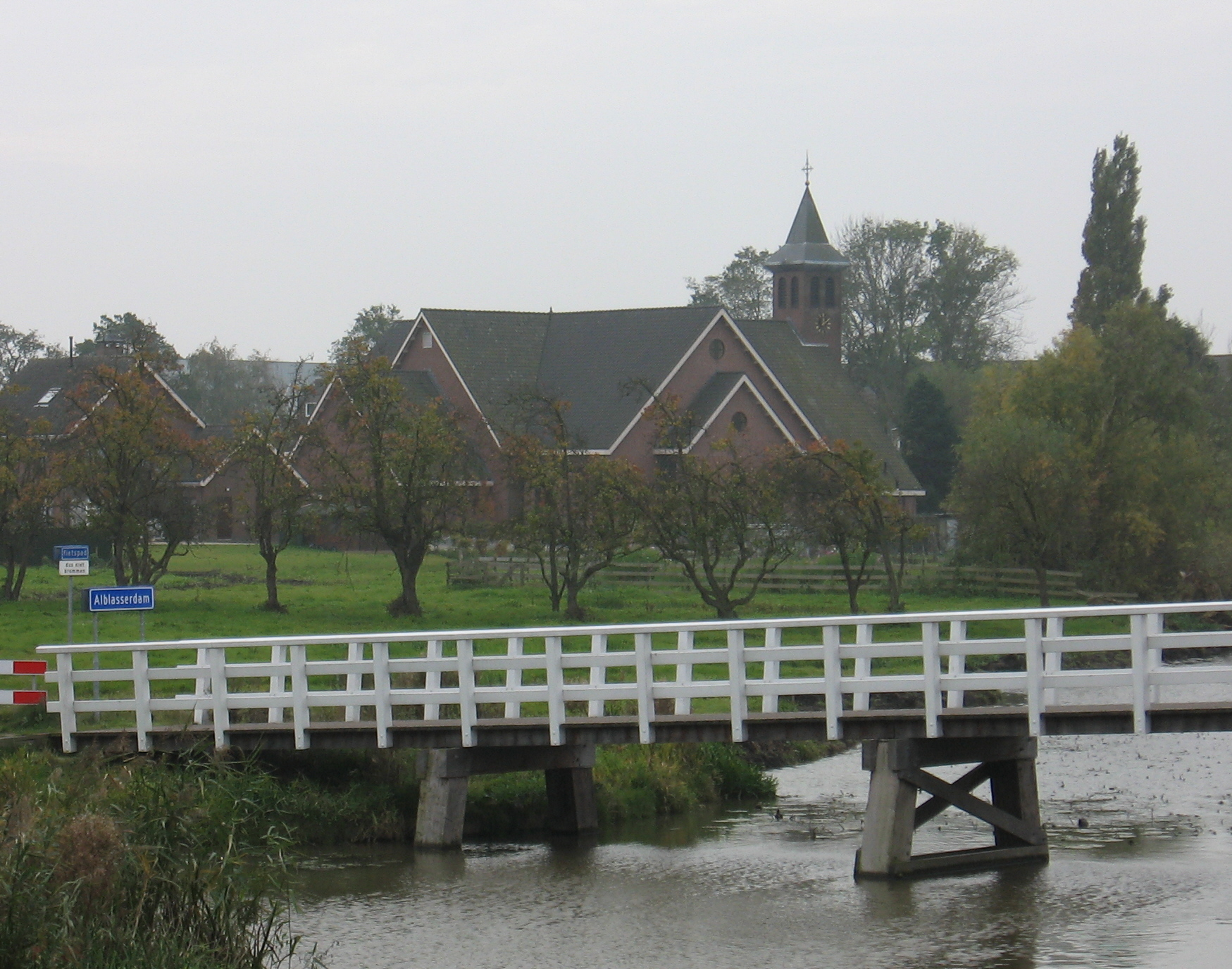
- Church in Alblasserdam

- Flag Coat of arms

- Location in South Holland
- Coordinates: 51°52′12.6″N 4°40′0″E
- Country: Netherlands
- Province: South Holland

Government
  - Body: Municipal council
  - Mayor: Jaap Paans (VVD)

Area
  - Total: 10.06 km^{2} (3.88 sq mi)
  - Land: 8.78 km^{2} (3.39 sq mi)
  - Water: 1.28 km^{2} (0.49 sq mi)
- Elevation: 4 m (13 ft)

Population (January 2021)
  - Total: 20,136
  - Density: 2,293/km^{2} (5,940/sq mi)
- Demonym: Alblasserdammer
- Time zone: UTC+1 (CET)
  - Summer (DST): UTC+2 (CEST)
- Postcode: 2950–2954
- Area code: 078
- Website: www.alblasserdam.nl

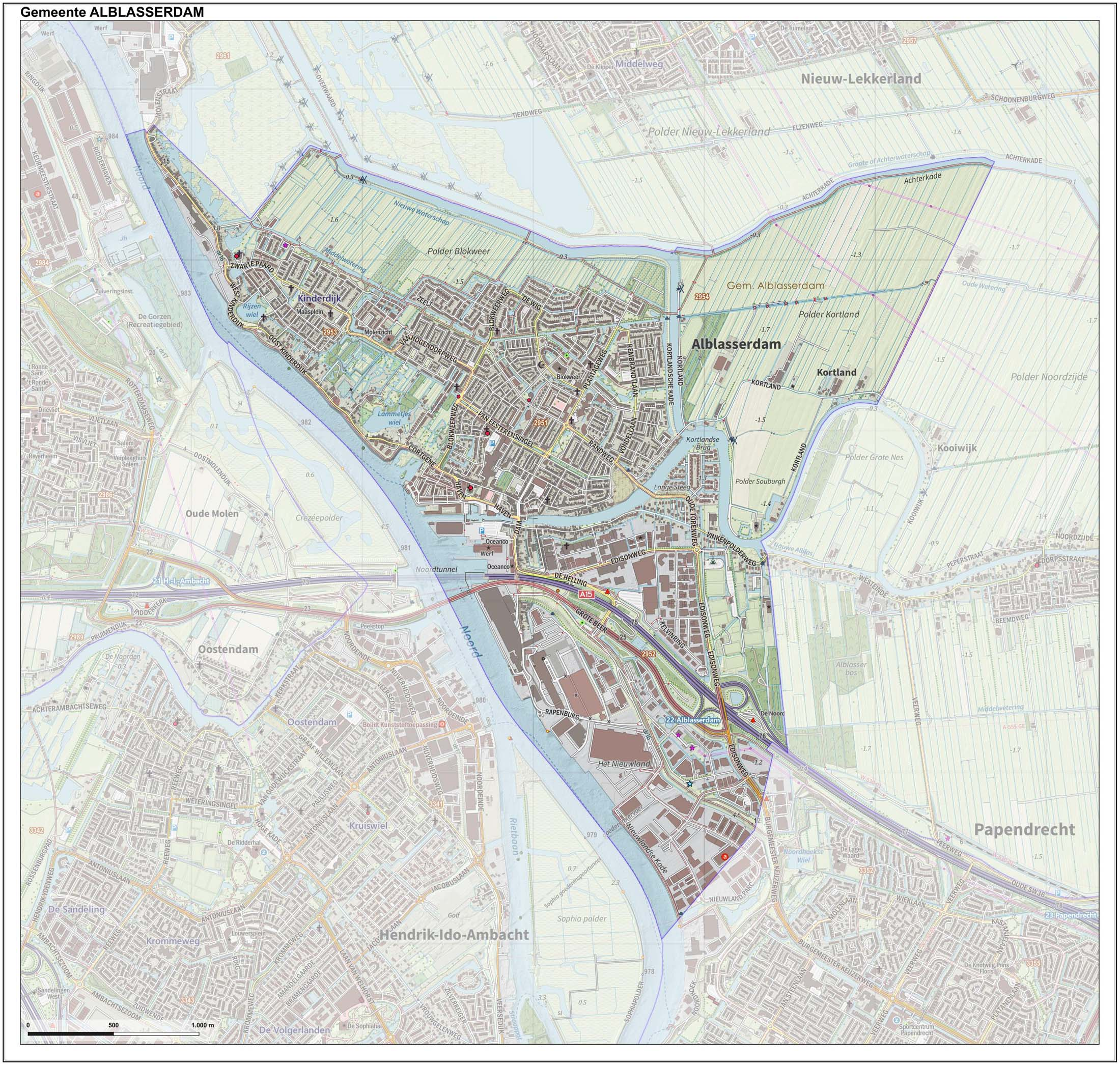
Topographic map of Alblasserdam, September 2014

Alblasserdam (Dutch: [ɑlˌblɑsərˈdɑm]) is a town and municipality in the western Netherlands, in the province of South Holland. It covers an area of 10.06 km^{2} (3.88 sq mi), of which 1.28 km^{2} (0.49 sq mi) is water, and has a population of 20,136 as of 2021. Alblasserdam is officially a part of the Drechtsteden region. A portion of the small village of Kinderdijk, which boasts the largest and most famous concentration of windmills in the Netherlands, is part of Alblasserdam.

== Etymology ==
The name Alblasserdam is derived from its location near the creek Alblas where a dam was built. Inhabitants of Alblasserdam are called Alblasserdammers (singular: Alblasserdammer).

== History ==
=== 13th–19th century ===
The town of Alblasserdam was first mentioned in the chronicles of Melis Stoke in 1299, but the municipality wasn't formed until 1447. Before that, it was part of Oud-Alblas.

Because of its location on the Noord river, one of the busiest waterways in Western Europe, water has played a major role in Alblasserdam's history. The river was important for its development and makes it an advantageous location for industry. Alblasserdam's strategic location also brought it negative consequences. For example, between 1350 and 1821, the Alblasserwaard polder flooded 32 times.

=== 20th century ===
During World War I, mayor Simon Berman and the local government of Alblasserdam kept busy with 60 Belgian refugees within the municipal boundaries. An ad hoc municipal fund for the unemployed was established.

Alblasserdam suffered during the German raid on Rotterdam on 11 May 1940, when its town centre was severely damaged. The historic Kerkstraat (Church Street) and the characteristic dike construction along the river, however, were spared. The invaders placed the Netherlands under German occupation.

The North Sea flood of 1953 also affected a portion of Alblasserdam. The Delta Works program included reinforcements to the dikes and improvement of the locks. Therefore, water no longer poses a direct danger to Alblasserdam. In 1987, the custom yacht builder Oceanco started building yachts in the 80 metre+ range.

In 1999 the town celebrated its 700th anniversary.

=== 21st century ===
Bert Blase served as mayor from 1999 to 2014, when he was appointed as mayor of Vlaardingen. Subsequently, the mayor of Hendrik-Ido-Ambacht, Jan Heijkoop, also acted as mayor Alblasserdam. On March 30, 2023 Jan Willem Boersma was installed as mayor of Alblasserdam, succeeding Jaap Paans, who had been the mayor of Alblasserdam since July 1, 2015.

== Public transportation ==
- Waterbus route 1:
  - Rotterdam Willemskade - Krimpen aan den IJssel Stormpolder - Ridderkerk De Schans - Alblasserdam Kade - Dordrecht Merwekade.

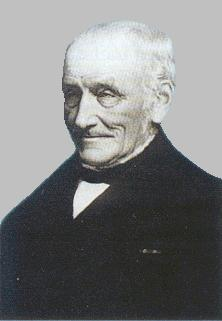
Fop Smit

== Notable people ==
- Fop Smit (1777–1866) a Dutch naval architect, shipbuilder and shipowner; founded what became Smit International
- Simon Berman (1861–1934) the Mayor of Alblasserdam, 1914-1923
- Cornelis van Eesteren (1897-1988) a Dutch architect and urban planner
- Koos Schouwenaar (1902–1941) a Dutch rower, competed at the 1928 Summer Olympics
- Patrick van Kerckhoven (born 1970) a darkcore or gabber DJ and producer

== Gallery ==
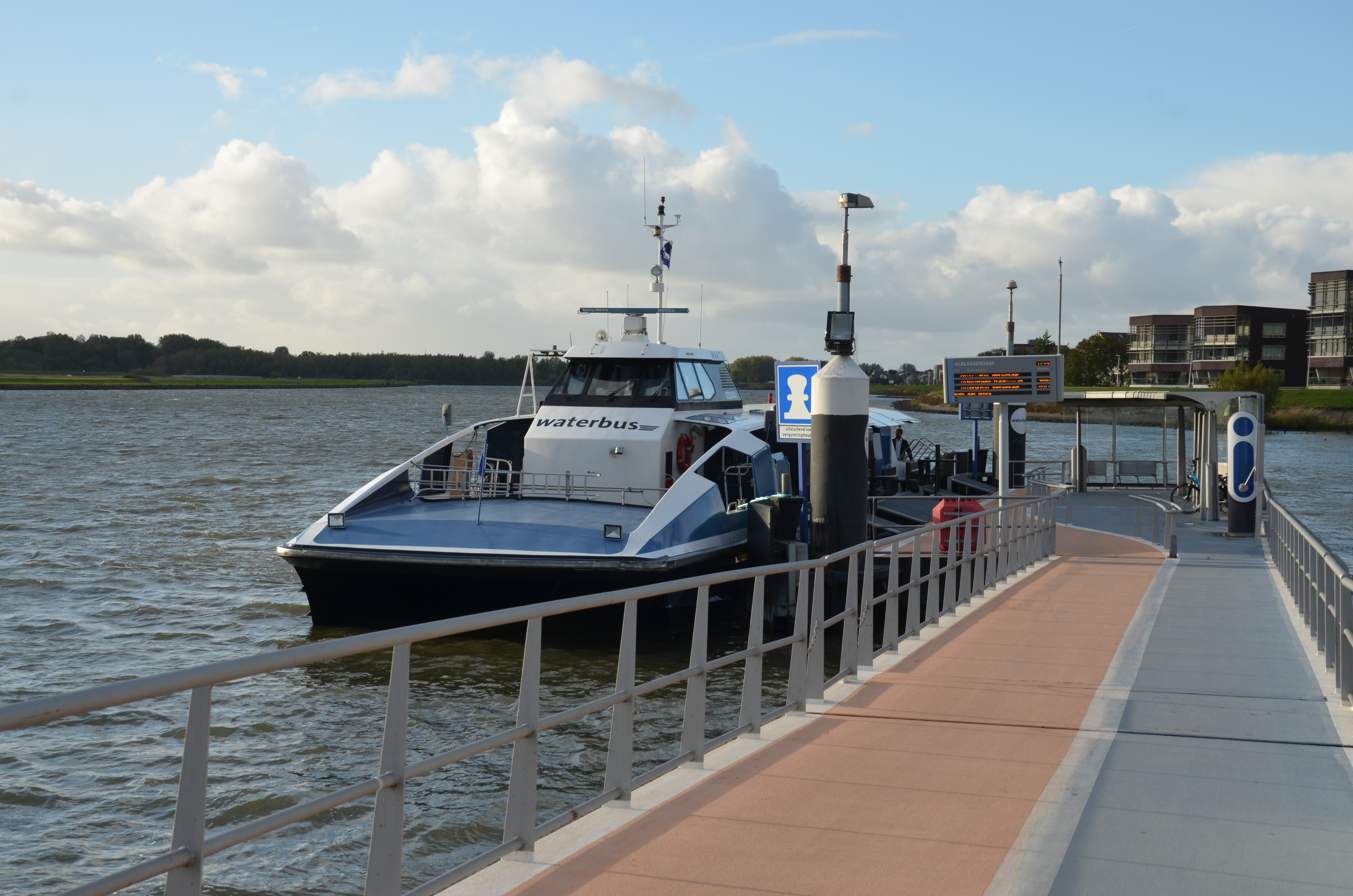
Wantij ship Waterbus Alblasserdam

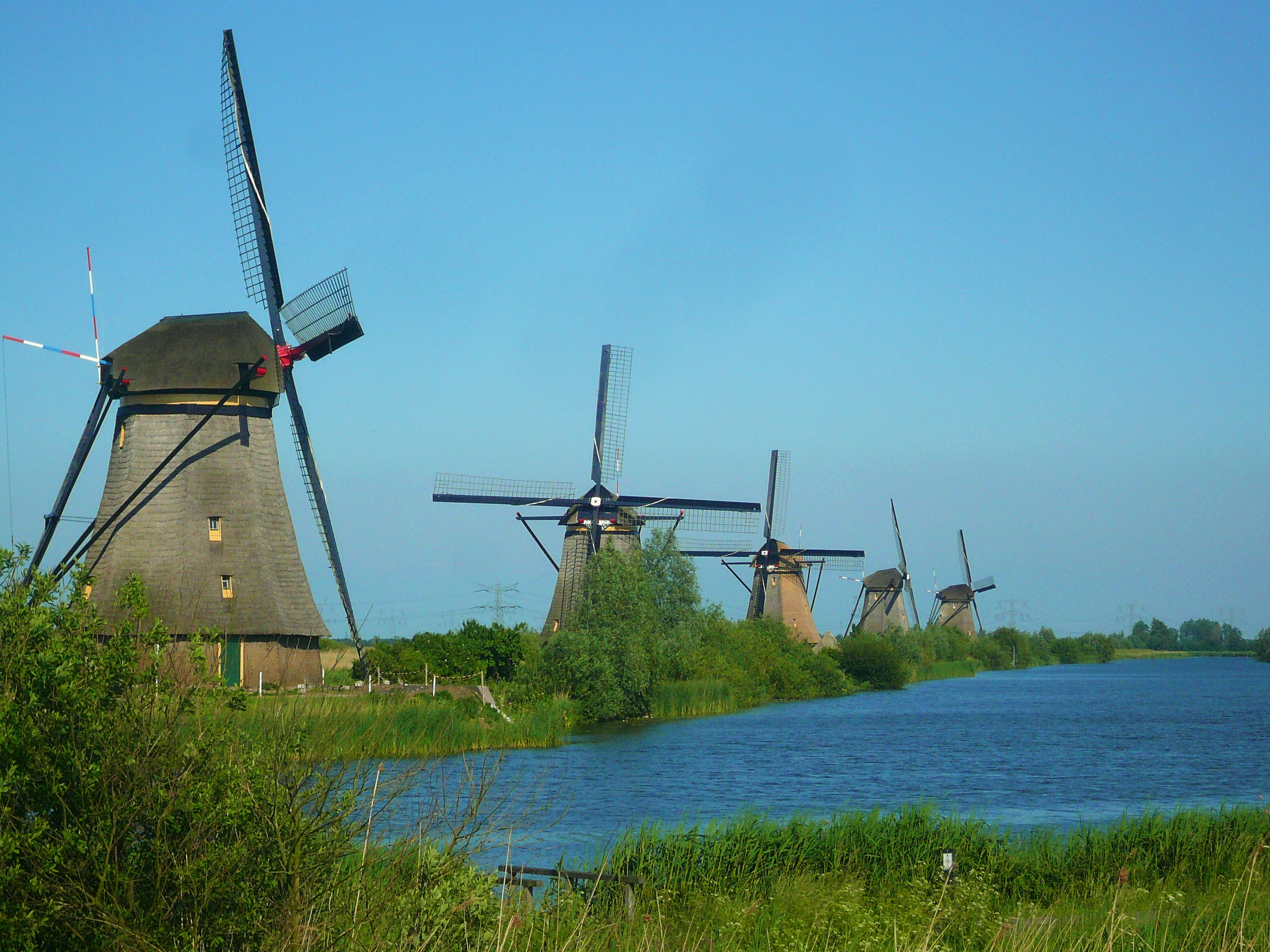
Kinderdijk

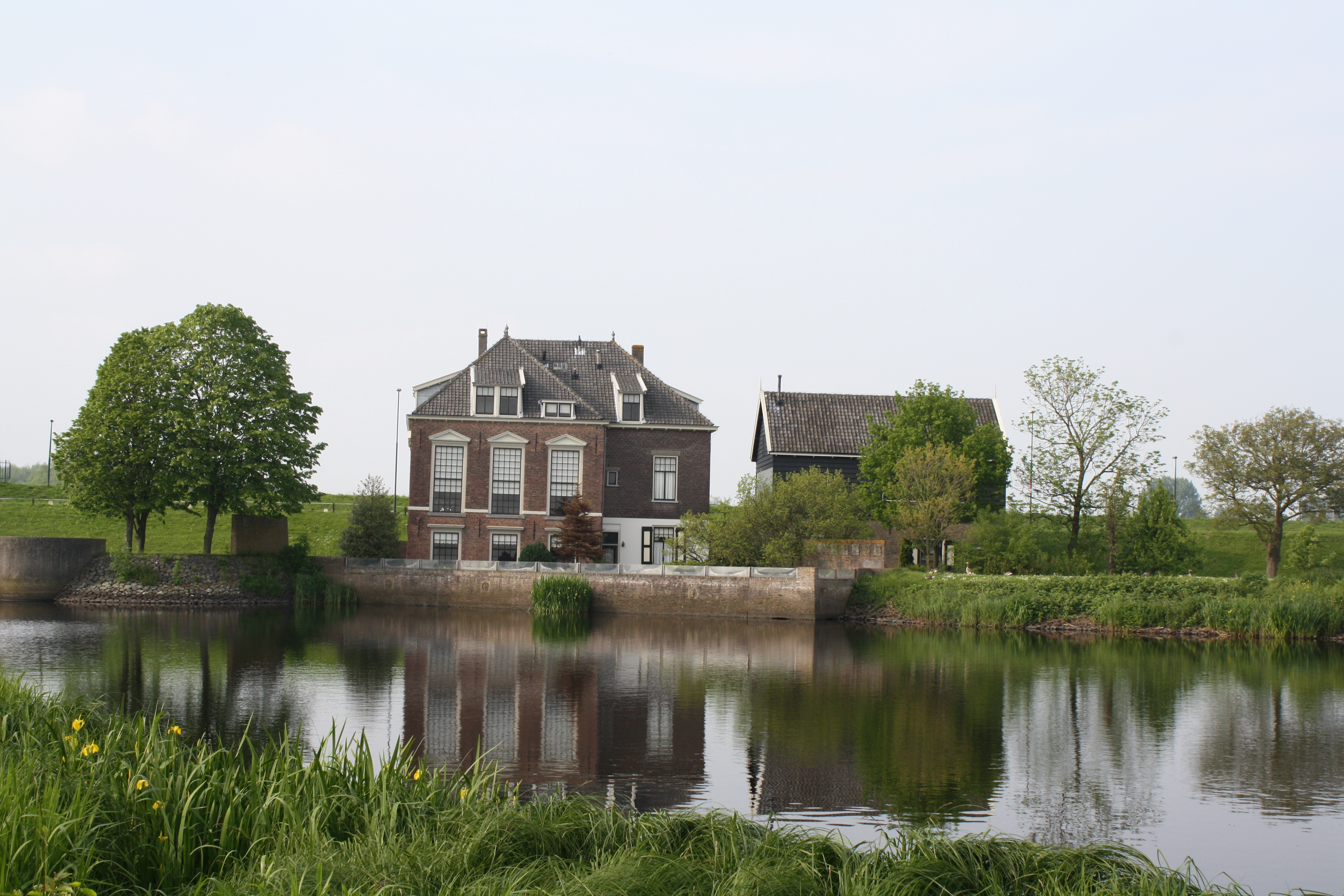
Pool side house, kinderdijk

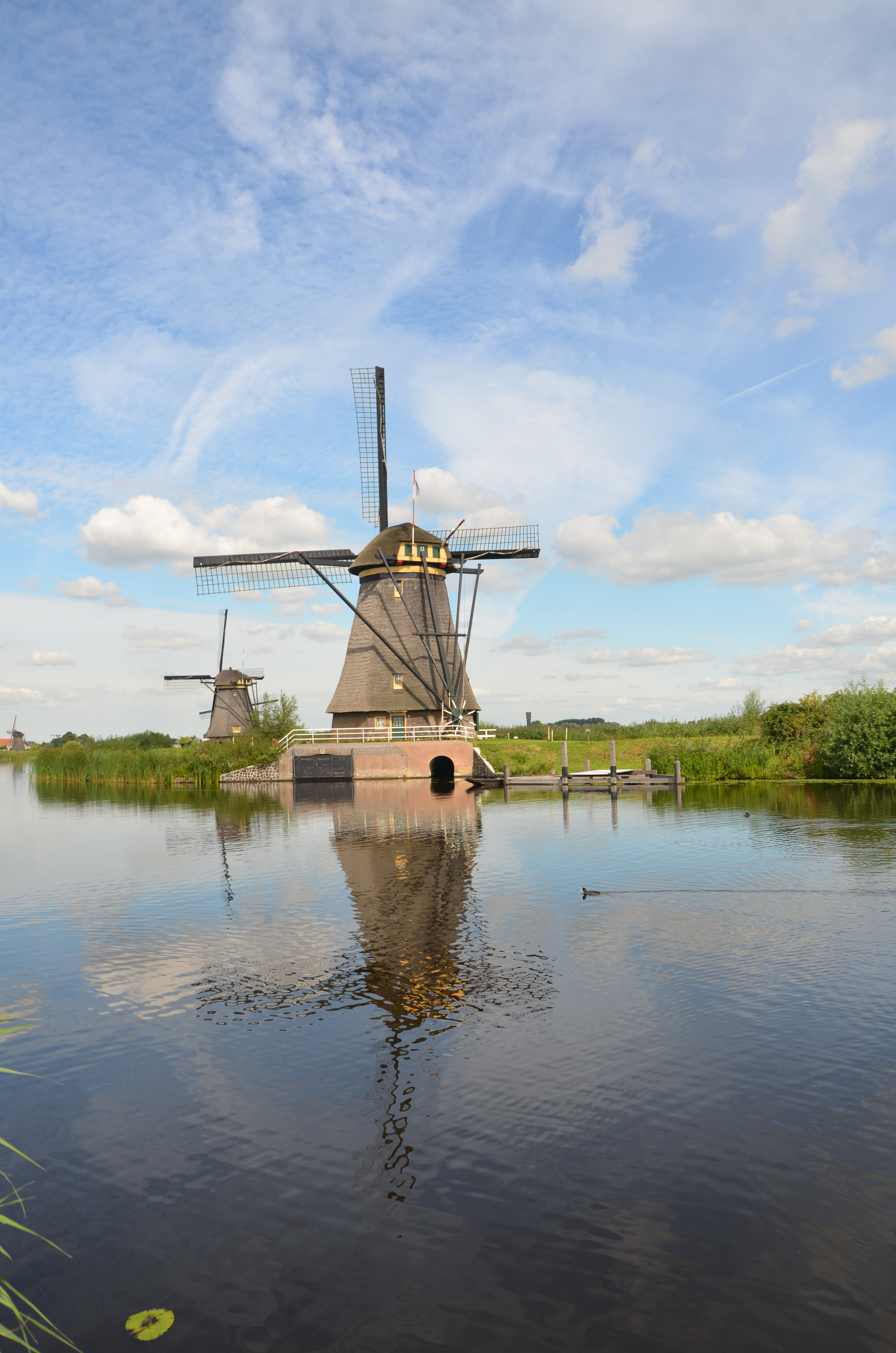
Windpump at Molens Kinderdijk
