= Warder, Netherlands =

Warder
- Village
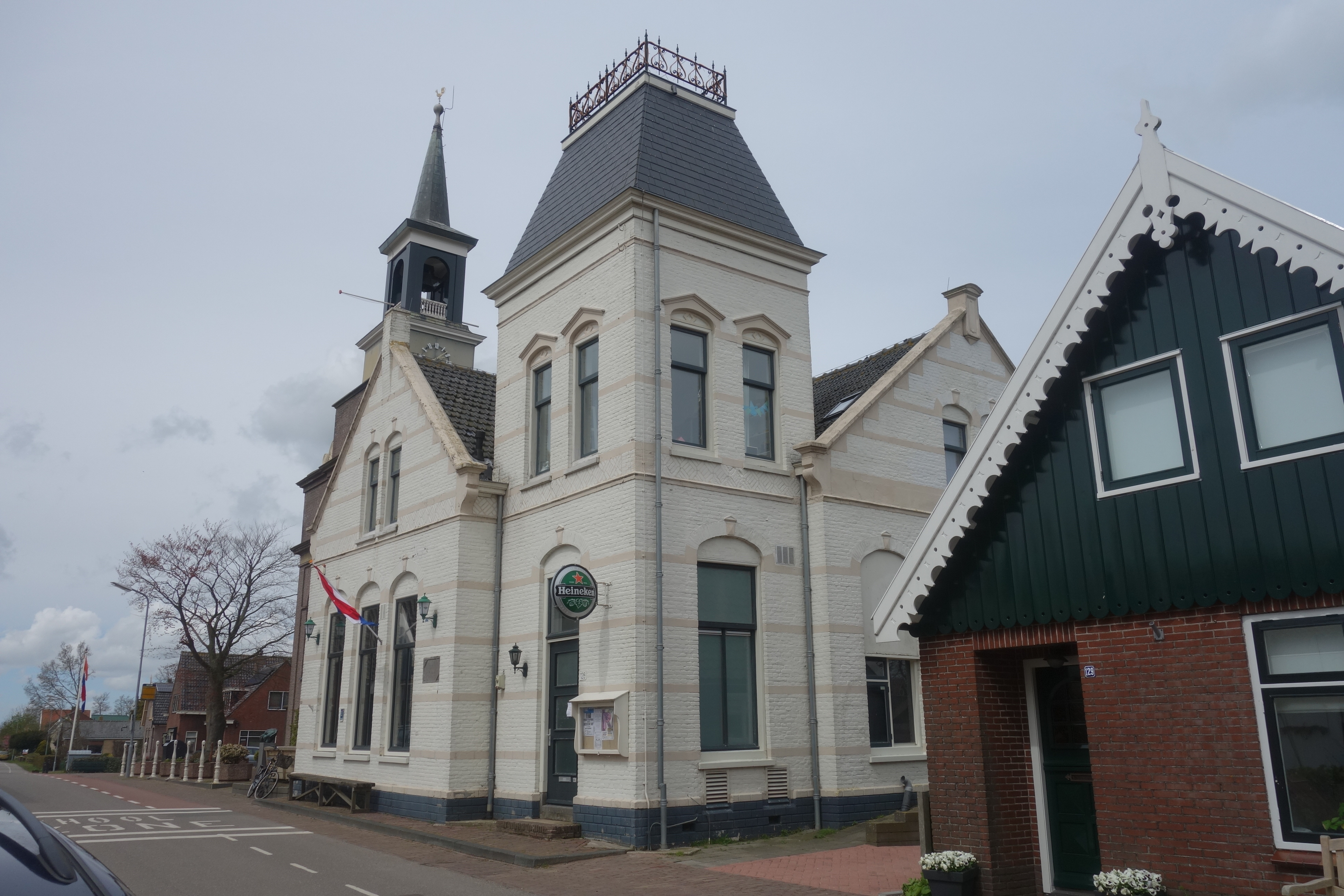
- Former school building

- Coat of arms

- Location in the Netherlands Location in the province of North Holland in the Netherlands
- Coordinates: 52°35′53″N 5°1′39″E
- Country: Netherlands
- Province: North Holland
- Municipality: Edam-Volendam

Area
  - Total: 10.82 km^{2} (4.18 sq mi)
- Elevation: −1.3 m (−4.3 ft)

Population (2021)
  - Total: 810
  - Density: 75/km^{2} (190/sq mi)
- Time zone: UTC+1 (CET)
  - Summer (DST): UTC+2 (CEST)
- Postal code: 1473
- Dialing code: 0299

Warder is a village in the Dutch province of North Holland. It is a part of the municipality of Edam-Volendam, and lies about 7 km northeast of Purmerend.

The village was first mentioned between 1130 and 1161 as Werthere, and means "island". The original village was probably more to the east on the former lake Almere and moved inland as the Zuiderzee started to grow. The current Warder developed in the late 12th century as a peat excavation settlement. The elementary school was built as an L-shaped building with tower in 1885. It was renovated around 1920.

Warder was home to 290 people in 1840. It was a separate municipality between 1817 and 1970, when the new municipality of Zeevang was created. In 2016, it became part of the municipality of Edam-Volendam.

== Gallery ==
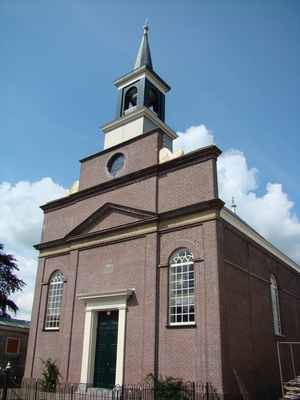
The church of Warder

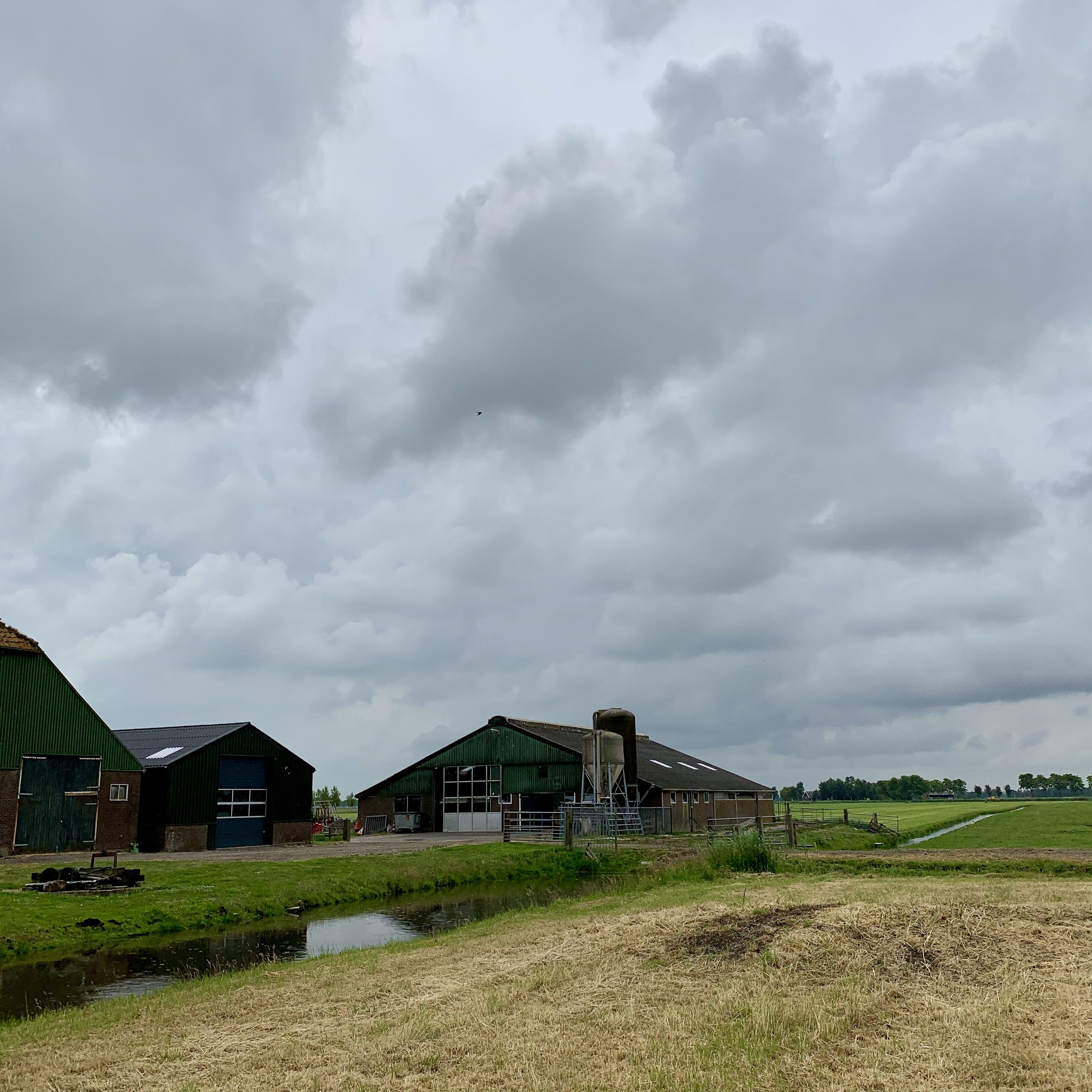
Farm in Warder

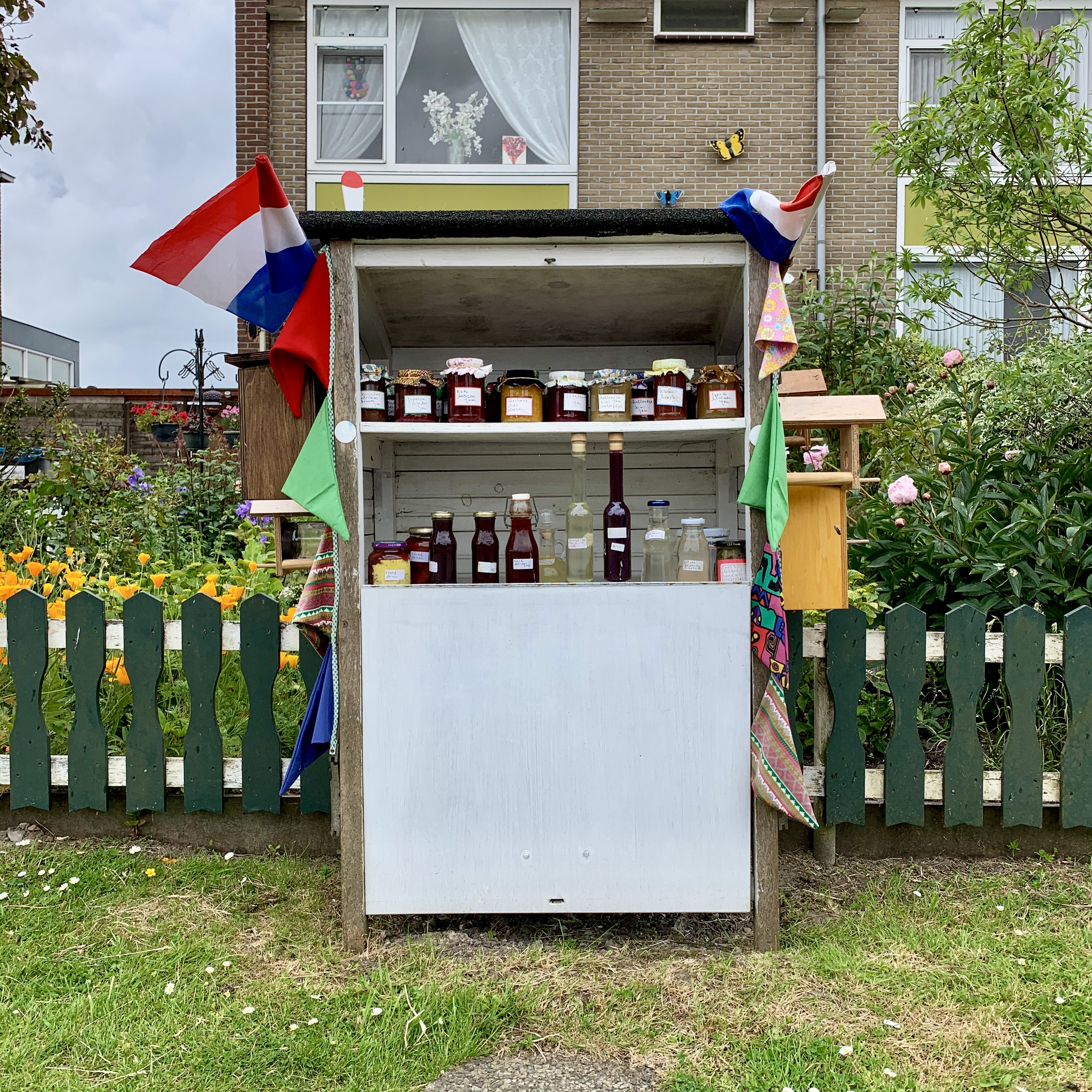
Little shop in the street
