= Middelie =

- Village
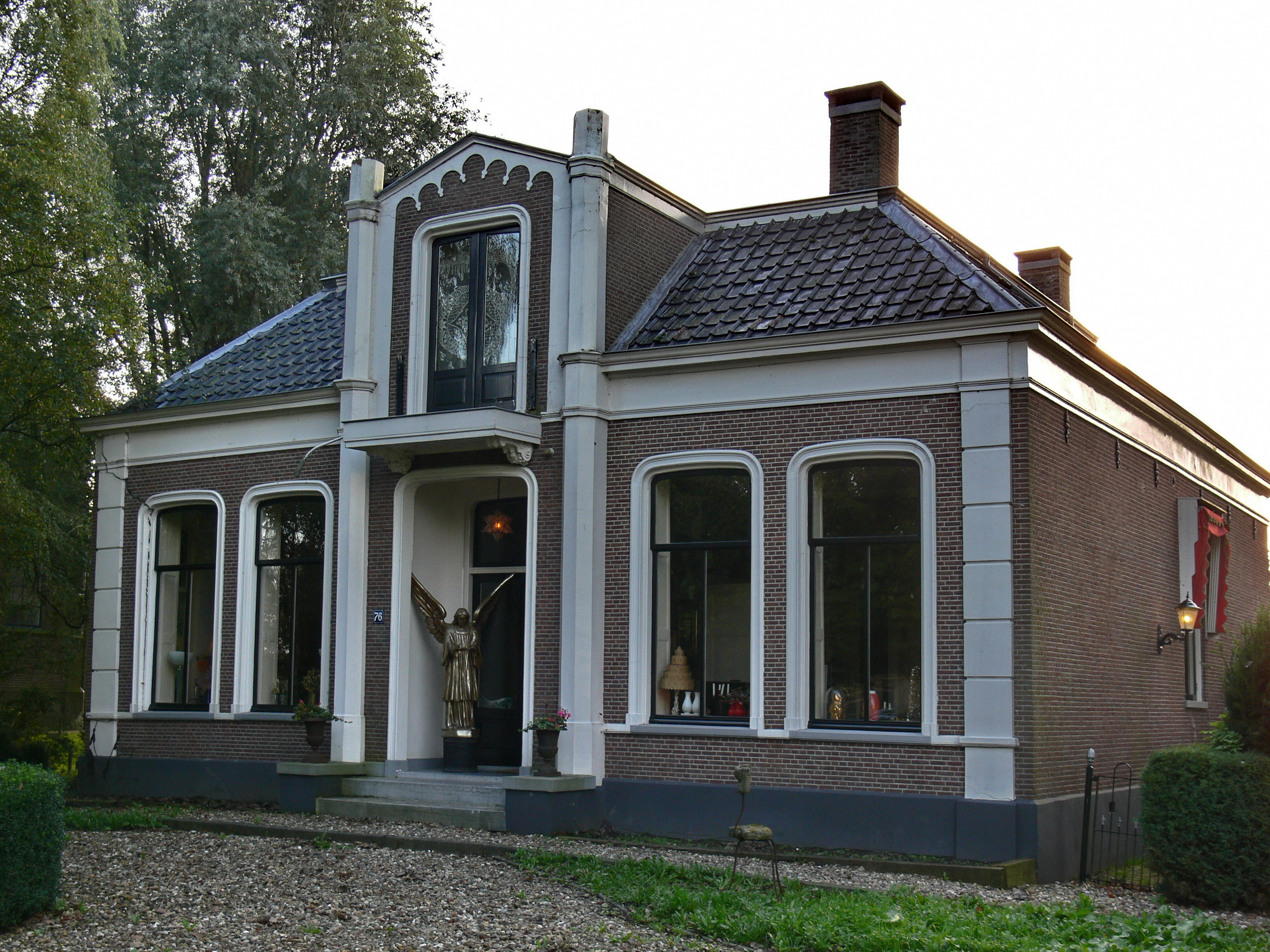

- Flag Coat of arms

- Location in the Netherlands Location in the province of North Holland in the Netherlands
- Coordinates: 52°31′56″N 5°1′2″E
- Country: Netherlands
- Province: North Holland
- Municipality: Edam-Volendam

Area
  - Total: 8.27 km^{2} (3.19 sq mi)
- Elevation: −1.5 m (−4.9 ft)

Population (2021)
  - Total: 720
  - Density: 87/km^{2} (230/sq mi)
- Time zone: UTC+1 (CET)
  - Summer (DST): UTC+2 (CEST)
- Postal code: 1472
- Dialing code: 0299

Middelie is a village in the Dutch province of North Holland. It is a part of the municipality of Edam-Volendam, and lies about 5 km northeast of Purmerend.

== History ==
The village was first mentioned in 1277 as Homines de Middela, and means "the middle river". Middelie developed in the 12th century as a peat excavation settlement. It used to be a fishing village, but after the Purmer was poldered, it lost its connection to the sea and the village stagnated. During the Reformation, Mennonites settled in the village, and used to make up half the population until the 20th century.

The Mennonite church is a modest aisleless church which was built in 1899 as a replacement of a wooden church. In 2013, ownership was transferred to a foundation and is used for weddings, meetings and concerts.

Middelie was home to 324 people in 1840. It was a separate municipality until 1970, when the new municipality of Zeevang was created. In 2016, it became part of the municipality of Edam-Volendam.
