= Stoffel Muller =

Stoffel Muller (1776 – 3 August 1833) was a Dutchman who led a small Protestant sect in the early nineteenth century. Known as the Zwijndrechtse nieuwlichters, the sect was later said to have had a communist ideology; it resisted civil government and held property commonly.

Stoffel Muller

== Biography ==
Muller was born on 16 February 1776 in Puttershoek. His father was a sailor and Muller accompanied him frequently; after the death of his father, he worked as a skipper. He married Helena Groenendijk (died 1853) and had three sons with her.

Muller was raised in a strict religious environment and joined the Protestant church as a member ("lidmaat") in 1793. According to family lore he fell ill in Emden on one of his journeys and had to stay there a while to convalesce; during that time he came under the influence of the Lutheran Pietism. He was reputed to have had a religious experience in 1816 during a nightly walk, which was to inform his theology. Afterward, he became estranged from his family and sought people with a similar religious conviction; he found that in Dirk Valk, a former bailiff from Waddinxveen, and his family and friends. When Valk lost his position, the two traveled around to find means to support themselves and those attracted to Muller's theology and Valk's reputed belief in the imminent return of Christ. On one of those trips, when they were investigating a business opportunity in Amsterdam, Muller met Maria Leer of Edam, a prophetess and domestic servant 17 years his junior who had grown up in an orphanage; though he was never legally divorced from his first wife he formed a "spiritual marriage" with Leer in 1817.

That same year, Muller, with Leer and the Valks, formed the congregation (they saw it as a Christelijke Broedergemeente, an "Apostolic Brethren Association" modeled on the early Christians) which later became known as the Zwijndrechtse nieuwlichters, whose ideals were based on the Sermon on the Mount; later studies proposed that this was a kind of communist ideology held by many Protestant sects of the time. While Muller was considered the group's leader, he was not formally appointed as such.

He and Leer were arrested for vagrancy in 1820 and served a year in prison. He died in Varik, on 3 August 1833, on a trip where he was as usual accompanied by Leer, possibly of cholera.

== Theology and legacy ==
Muller's religious education was rudimentary, yet he managed to build a consistent religious system from his knowledge of the New Testament. The system was based on Romans 11:36, "For from him and through him and for him are all things". Stoffel interprets this to mean that everything, including sin, derives from God. This theology excluded predestination, since that which comes from God and through God and goes toward God can never be lost. The crucifixion is the single most important act of love, and the Sermon on the Mount provided the necessary guidance for life on earth. Muller's congregation was to live as the early Christians did, in love and with shared property. As long as Muller was alive and could enforce his will, the congregation followed those ideals; after his death, it quickly fell apart.

Much of what is known about Muller comes from the (not always reliable) recollections of Maria Leer; in 1860 she had moved to Leiden to live in the Bethlehemshof, where she met the writer Louise Sophie Blussé, who wrote Leer's memoirs and published them in 1892, under the pen name D.N. Anagrapheus, with a preface by Remonstrant preacher Jan Hendrik Maronier (1827–1920). Arthur van Schendel's skipper, Wuddink, a character in his novel De Waterman, was based on Muller. Leer's memoirs were likely the source for van Schendel.
