= Zwijndrechtse Nieuwlichters =

The Zwijndrechtse Nieuwlichters ("Zwijndrecht New Lighters") were a Dutch Protestant sect in the early 19th century, led by Stoffel Muller, a former skipper, and Maria Leer, a prophetess. The sect was also known as the Christelijke Broedergemeente ("Apostolic Brethren Association") and the Zwavelstokkengeloof ("Matchstick Faith") and practiced what was later called "apostolic communism". The group held property in common and earned its keep by selling matchsticks and chocolate. Its appeal was broadly across the social classes, including day laborers, factory owners, and tradesmen. By the 1820s the group had established a community in Zwijndrecht, but could not outlive its founder by much; after the death of Muller the community split apart, with some members leaving for the United States and others forming their own congregations in the Netherlands.

== History ==
=== Beginnings ===
The sect was led by Stoffel Muller, a skipper from Puttershoek who came from a strict religious background who had had a religious experience that spawned a theology based on a "vague pantheism" which put a new spin on the idea of sin. Muller's partner was Maria Leer of Edam, a prophetess and domestic servant, 17 years his junior, whom he had met in Amsterdam and with whom he had formed a "spiritual marriage". The third of the three founders was the local schout (bailiff) from Waddinxveen, Dirk Valk, whose family was involved as well, as were a number of day laborers in the area. While Muller was considered the group's leader, he was not formally appointed as such.

=== Settlement ===
The group settled with Valk in Waddinxveen and formed a congregation, inspired by the Sermon on the Mount and modeled on the early Christian community. In 1818, the group moved to Polsbroekerdam, to the property of the farmer Dirk Schenkel. He offered them a place to stay, and in return they provided for themselves by making matches, which they sold door to door while propagating their faith. The match business provided nicknames for the group: nieuwlichters translates as "new-lighters", and zwavelstokkengeloof references those matches as well. Some historians argue that it was thanks to the group's hardworking nature that they received a measure of acceptance, despite their "communist features" and their despise for social convention.

When the house they lived in Polsbroekerdam was sold, the group took to their ships and sailed around for a while, unable to find a homestead. In or around 1820, Muller, Valk, and Leer were sentenced to a year in jail in Dordrecht for vagrancy. Arie Goud and his wife, also members, were not sentenced; by 1822, when the three were released, the group had moved to Puttershoek and settled there; on 20 April 1823, the group legalized its community property relationship in Puttershoek. Valk and his wife, who had sold all their family possessions during the hard times of the late 1810s, left the group in 1822 to await Christ separately; Valk and his wife left shortly thereafter. In 1829, the remaining members bought a shipyard in Zwijndrecht and settled down for the last time, in the place that gave them their name.

=== Developments in the 1830s and dissolution ===
The 1830s saw the group prosper. They were joined by members who made important contributions to the settlement, including a wealthy baker from Krommenie and his wife, who started a bakery; a shoemaker from Middelburg and his family; and a former civil servant from the Dutch Indies. The most important new member, however, was Mets, a manufacturer of chocolate from Rotterdam, who came with his family and brought over his entire plant, workers and all, and the products were sold by the group's members. At this time there were two main sections to the settlement in Zwijndrecht. One, Welgelegen, consisted of a dance hall, which Muller had bought in Schellingwoude, taken apart, and moved to Zwijndrecht by ship. Meals were served in that hall; the members slept in a Keulenaar, a steam-powered ship that had been placed next to the dance hall. Men and women slept separately in two large rooms. Scripture was read during meals, and after dinner time was spent on religious study. The second area, Zomerzorg, was adjacent to the chocolate factory.

Since the congregation did not accept civil government, they did not register the birth of their children (Maria Leer was arrested for not registering her daughter) and refused to do military service. The latter refusal became more urgent in the 1830s, starting with the Belgian Revolution, when men were called to arms to help suppress the uprising in what became Belgium. The congregation asked in vain to be exempt on religious grounds, and when the men were called up and refused to handle weapons, they were mistreated in the detention barracks and one man reportedly died. A professor from Leiden who was good friends with William II of the Netherlands, J. W. Tydeman, intervened on their behalf, assuring the king that he had nothing to fear from the group since their goals were only spiritual; as a result the members were given only non-combat duties while serving in the military.

After the death of Muller in 1835, the group fell apart; harassed by local government which frequently put its leaders in jail, the group found it difficult to maintain its ideals and disbanded in 1846. Some thirty members left for the United States in 1863, attracted by the doctrine of the Church of Jesus Christ of Latter-day Saints; they kept separate from the LDS, though they established a colony in Utah.

Valk, who had moved to Woerdense Verlaat, a hamlet in the province of Utrecht described as the end of the world, subsequently moved to Mijdrecht where he again attracted a number of faithful from the old congregation. According to E. Cats Wor, for seven years a preacher in Mijdrecht, a group of some forty people, mostly artisans and laborers, from Puttershoek and Zwijndrecht lived communally in a ruined place out in the country. They did not share wives, but they did share everything else. They believed in God's unconditional love and did not accept damnation; they did not rest on Sunday since every day belonged to God; they used no tobacco. The members practiced charity and did not retaliate when attacked, nor did they accept military conscription. Two professors, Jodocus Heringa of Utrecht and De Hoop Scheffer, were unable to sway the group toward orthodoxy. By 1848, so many younger members of the group had left that the community was no longer viable and dissolved.

== Doctrine ==
The sect's idea of the divinity was based on Paul's Epistle to the Romans, chapter 11 verse 36. They believed the meaning of this verse showed that sin derived from God; the sect's interpretation of it also excluded a belief in predestination. They swore off luxury, and held property communally; other members were attracted by the lifestyle based on Acts 2 adopted by the group. While Valk reputedly believed in the imminent return of Christ, the group as a whole was more attracted to the lifestyle suggested by Acts 2. While on their first visit to Amsterdam, Muller and Valk had met a group of Rappists, with whom they shared the idea that property should be held communally.

Later scholars saw in the group's ideals a kind of communist ideology; such ideas were held by many other Protestant groups in the early nineteenth century. Like the Labadists, they accepted only "spiritual" marriages, without regard for the constraints of civil marriage. Requirements were that the marriage partners were 24 or older, that no one in the community objected, and that the wife would be obedient to the husband. Some in the community wished to have the wives in common as well; while Muller was alive there was no question of allowing this, but after his death the idea of sharing wives seemed to have caused a split in the community resulting in the trek to the United States, with the Zomerzorg members (who were better off financially) sticking to Muller's doctrine.

== Sources and legacy ==
Much of the information on Muller and Leer's lives come from the latter's memoir. In 1860, Leer moved to Leiden to live in the Bethlehemshof, where she met the writer Louise Sophie Blussé, who wrote Leer's memoir and published it in 1892, under the pseudonym D.N. Anagrapheus, with a preface by Remonstrant preacher Jan Hendrik Maronier (1827–1920). An article on the group by the Dutch historian and lawyer Hendrick Peter Godfried Quack in De Gids drew international attention, as "a most interesting and instructive chapter in the history of social movements".

== See also ==
- Omnia sunt communia
