= Jan Hendrik Maronier =

Dutch writer

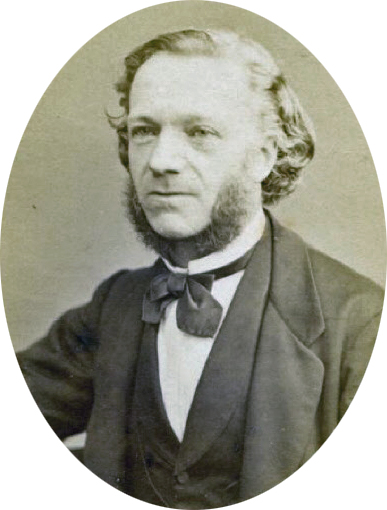

Personal life
- Born: 16 June 1827

Religious life
- Religion: Christianity

Jan Hendrik Maronier (Rotterdam, June 16, 1827 – Renkum, November 29, 1920) was a Dutch pastor and writer.

== Personal life ==
Maronier was born in Rotterdam in 1827 as the son of the accountant Jan Hendrikszoon Maronier and Susanna Maria van Lil. He married Aletta Nijhoff, daughter of the bookseller, publisher and historian Isaac Anne Nijhoff and of Martina Cornelia Houtkamp, on 20 July 1853 in Arnhem. He died in November 1920 at the age of 93 in Renkum. His son, Jan Hendrik was curator of the Royal Netherlands Institute of Southeast Asian and Caribbean Studies.

== Education and career ==
He studied theology and successively became a Remonstrant minister in Zevenhuizen and Bleiswijk (1851), in Leiden (1853), in Utrecht (1869) and from 1881 to 1893 in his birthplace Rotterdam. He has published many religious works. His Inrichting der christelijke gemeenten [Organization of the Christian Congregations] was awarded in 1874 by the Teylers Eerste Genootschap (Theological Society). In 1892 he wrote an introduction to De Zwijndrechtse nieuwlichters (1816–1832) volgens de gedenkschriften van Maria Leer. [Zwijndrecht New Lighters (1816–1832) according to the memoirs of Maria Leer], written by the 91-year-old writer Louise Sophie Blussé, under the pseudonym D.N. Anagrapheus. She recorded the memoirs of one of the leaders of this sect, Maria Leer. His Geschiedenis van het protestantisme [History of Protestantism] was crowned in 1897 by the "Haagsche Genootschap tot verdediging van den Christelijke godsdienst" [Hague Society in defense of the Christian religion]. In 1905 he wrote an extensive biography of the Arminian theologian Jacobus Arminius.

== Works ==
- De eerste Brief van den apostel Joannes, Isaac Anne Nijhoff en zoon, Arnhem, 1855
- De oudejaarsavond, eene roepstem ter voorbereiding tot sterven, Nijhoff, Den Haag, 1856
- De oudste geloofsbelijdenis, 1859
- De inrichting der christelijke gemeenten, vóór het ontstaan der Katholieke kerk, Bohn, Haarlem, 1874
- Het kerstfeest, Martinus Nijhoff, Den Haag, 1875
- Wat willen de Remonstranten?, Van Hinloopen Labberton, Doeburg, 1877
- Korte geschiedenis van het godsdienst-onderwijs in de christelijke kerk, drie delen, J. Muusses, Purmerend, 1881–1883
- Het inwendig woord, Van Holkema, Amsterdam, 1890
- Het paaschfeest, Gouda Quint, Arnhem, 1894
- Het pinksterfeest, Gouda Quint, Arnhem, 1894
- Geschiedenis van het Protestantisme van den Munsterschen vrede tot de Fransche revolutie 1648–1789, Brill, Leiden, 1897 (een nalezing verscheen in 1901)
- De orde der jezuieten, hare geschiedenis, inrichting en moraal, Boekhandel en Drukkerij voorheen Brill, Leiden, 1e druk 1899, 2e druk 1908
- Jacobus Arminius, Rogge, Amsterdam, 1905

== Notes and references ==
=== Sources ===
- Frederiks, J.G.; van den Branden, F. Jos. (1888). "Jan Hendrik Maronier". Biographisch woordenboek der Noord- en Zuidnederlandsche letterkunde (in Dutch). Amsterdam: L.J. Veen.
- Quack, H. P. G. (1892). "De Zwijndrechtsche broederschap. Godsdienstig Communisme in de eerste helft onzer eeuw". De Gids (in Dutch). 56: 230–64.
