= Blussé =

Blussé is a surname. Notable people with the surname include:

- Leonard Blussé (born 1946), Dutch historian
- Louise Sophie Blussé (1801–1896), Dutch writer
