= Polsbroek =

- Village
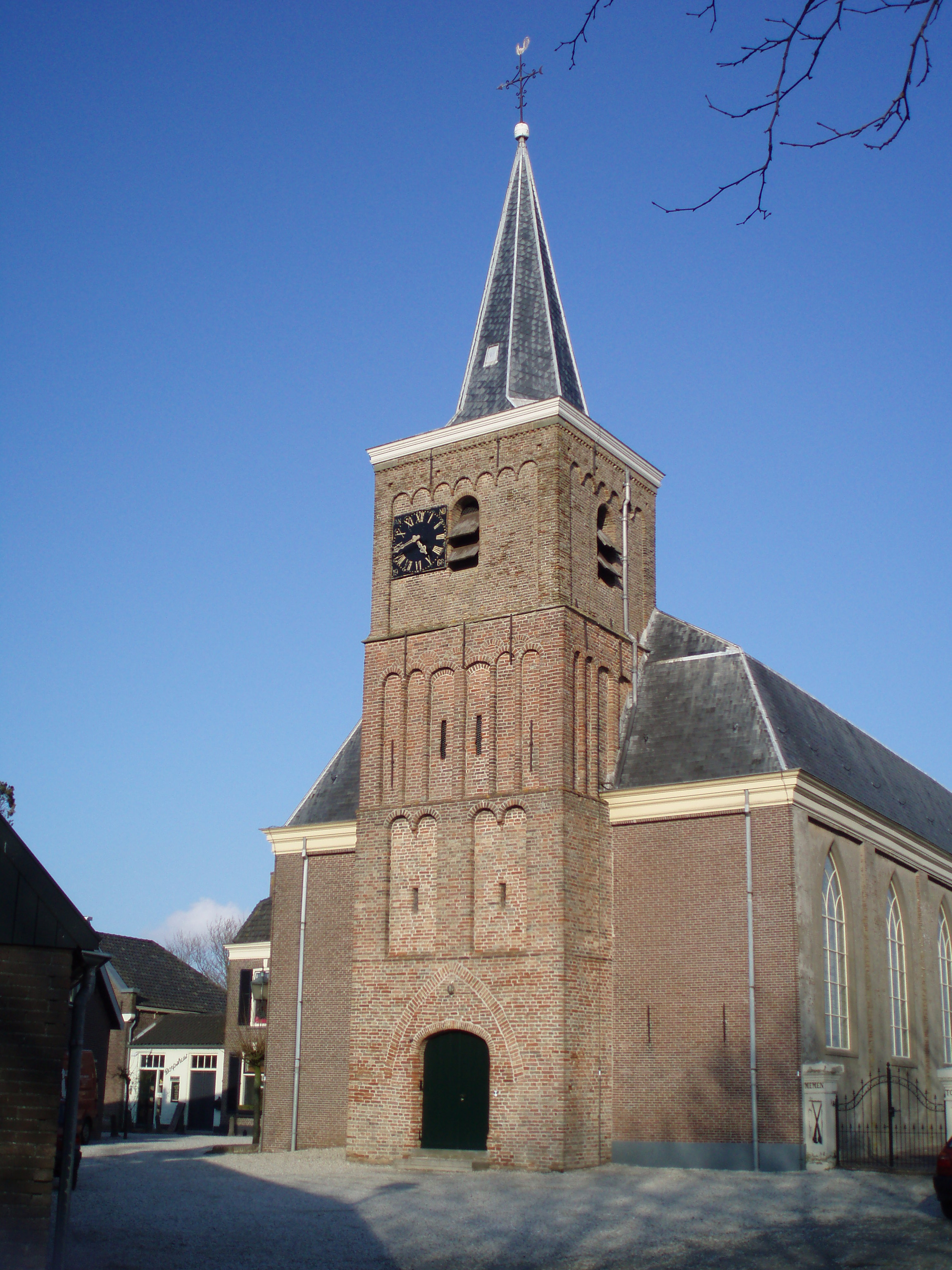
- Dutch Reformed Church of Polsbroek

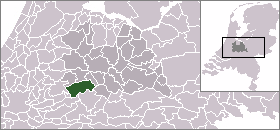
- The town centre (darkgreen) and the statistical district (lightgreen) of Polsbroek in the municipality of Lopik.
- Coordinates: 51°58′41″N 4°51′7″E
- Country: Netherlands
- Province: Utrecht
- Municipality: Lopik

Population (2018)
  - Total: 1,250

Polsbroek is a village in the Dutch province of Utrecht. It is a part of the municipality of Lopik, and lies about 10 km southeast of Gouda.

== Overview ==
The village of Polsbroek consists of a ribbon of farms on both sides of the Benschopse Wetering, with a small centre on the west side of the village. In 2001, the village centre of Polsbroek had 421 inhabitants. The built-up area of the town was 0.06 km^{2} (0.023 sq mi), and contained 143 residences. The wider statistical area of Polsbroek, which covers the complete former municipality, including the ribbon of farms and the hamlet of Polsbroekerdam, has a population of 1190, and an area of about 11 km^{2} (4.2 sq mi).

Number of inhabitants
Year	1812	1829	1849	1868	2004
Polsbroek	1295(*)	622	680	700	1190
Noord-Polsbroek		393	407		
Zuid-Polsbroek		229	273		

(*): includes Cabauw, Vliet, Vlist, Zevender, Hoenkoop.

== History ==
In the early 12th century Polsbroek itself was called first Pulzabruch, changing into Pulsebroch in 1155, to Pusbruch (from 1228 to 1229), Polsbroic, about 1296 and 1317, and then to Polsbroek. Since 1155 the (local) lords of Polsbroek are able to speak the high (blood court) middle and low justice over their territory.

Until the end of the 18th century, Noord-Polsbroek was a lage heerlijkheid or schoutambt, the lowest category of local jurisdictions, while Zuid-Polsbroek was a vrije en hoge heerlijkheid (Free and high fief of Zuid-Polsbroek), during the Golden Age owned by the De Graeff family from Amsterdam. As a free a high fief, Zuid-Polsbroek was an independent (semisouverain fief) of the provinces Holland or Utrecht, like the larger Barony of IJsselstein to the east. Noord-Polsbroek was itself a part of that Barony.

In 1812, a single municipality "Polsbroek" was created, covering both Noord-Polsbroek and Zuid-Polsbroek, and several surrounding villages (Cabauw, Vliet, Vlist, Zevender, and Hoenkoop). Between 1814 and 1817, half of the municipality lay in the province Holland, while the other half was in Utrecht. In 1817, Polsbroek was divided into 7 separate municipalities again. Until 1857, Polsbroek was divided along the Benschopse Wetering into two parts: Noord-Polsbroek and Zuid-Polsbroek. On September 8, 1857 Noord-Polsbroek and Zuid-Polsbroek again merged to a single municipality. In 1989 the municipality Polsbroek became a part of Lopik.

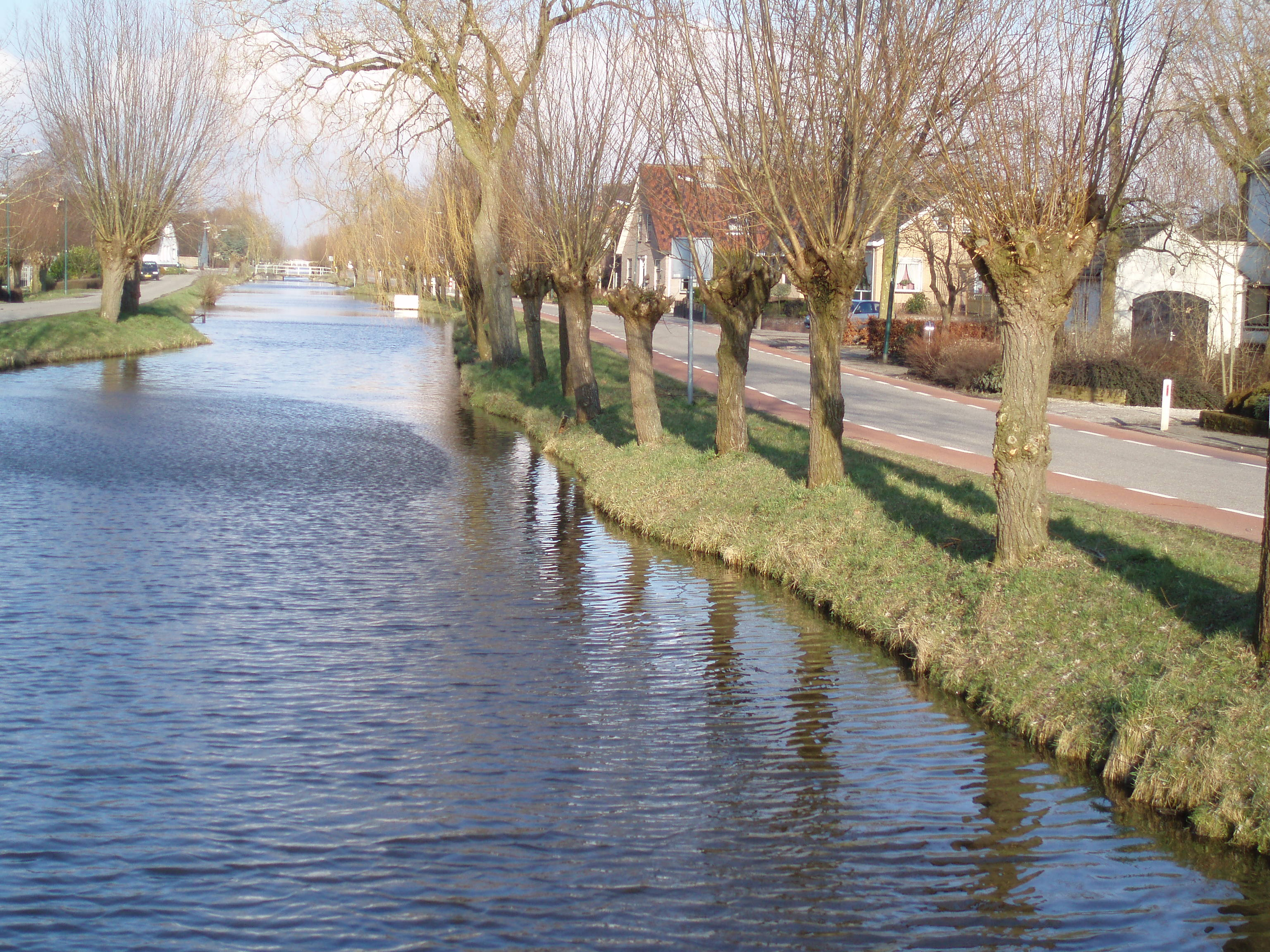
.

== See also ==
- Free and high fief of Zuid-Polsbroek (List of Lords of the Free and high fief)
- Noord-Polsbroek
