= Noord-Polsbroek =

Coordinates: 51°58′40″N 4°50′56″E

Noord-Polsbroek is a former village and municipality in the Dutch province of Utrecht. It existed between 1817 and 1857, when it merged with Zuid-Polsbroek to form a single municipality Polsbroek.

Noord-Polsbroek was the northern half of Polsbroek, north of the small river the Benschopse Wetering. Around 1850, the municipality had a population of about 410.
