= Maria Adeline Alice Schweistal =

Belgium born Dutch artist

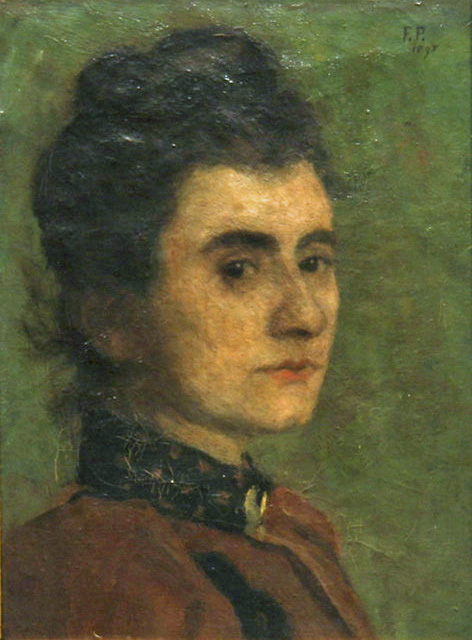
- self portrait, 1895
- Born: 9 April 1864; Brussels, Belgium
- Died: 7 June 1950 (aged 86); Amsterdam
- Other names: Fanny Psicha
- Known for: Painting

Maria Adeline Alice Schweistal or Fanny Psicha (1864-1950) was a Belgium born Dutch artist. She was known for her still lifes.

== Biography ==
Schweistal was born on 9 April 1864 in Brussels, Belgium, settling in Amsterdam in 1886. She attended the Rijksakademie van beeldende kunsten in Amsterdam. She studied with August Allebé, Hendrik Adriaan Christiaan Dekker, Hendrik Haverman, and Marie Wandscheer. Her work was included in the 1939 exhibition and sale Onze Kunst van Heden (Our Art of Today) at the Rijksmuseum in Amsterdam. Schweistal was a member of Arti et Amicitiae and Kunstenaarsvereniging Sint Lucas. She exhibited regularly from 1911 through 1940 with the Sint Lucas group.

Schweistal died on 7 June 1950 in Amsterdam.

== Gallery ==
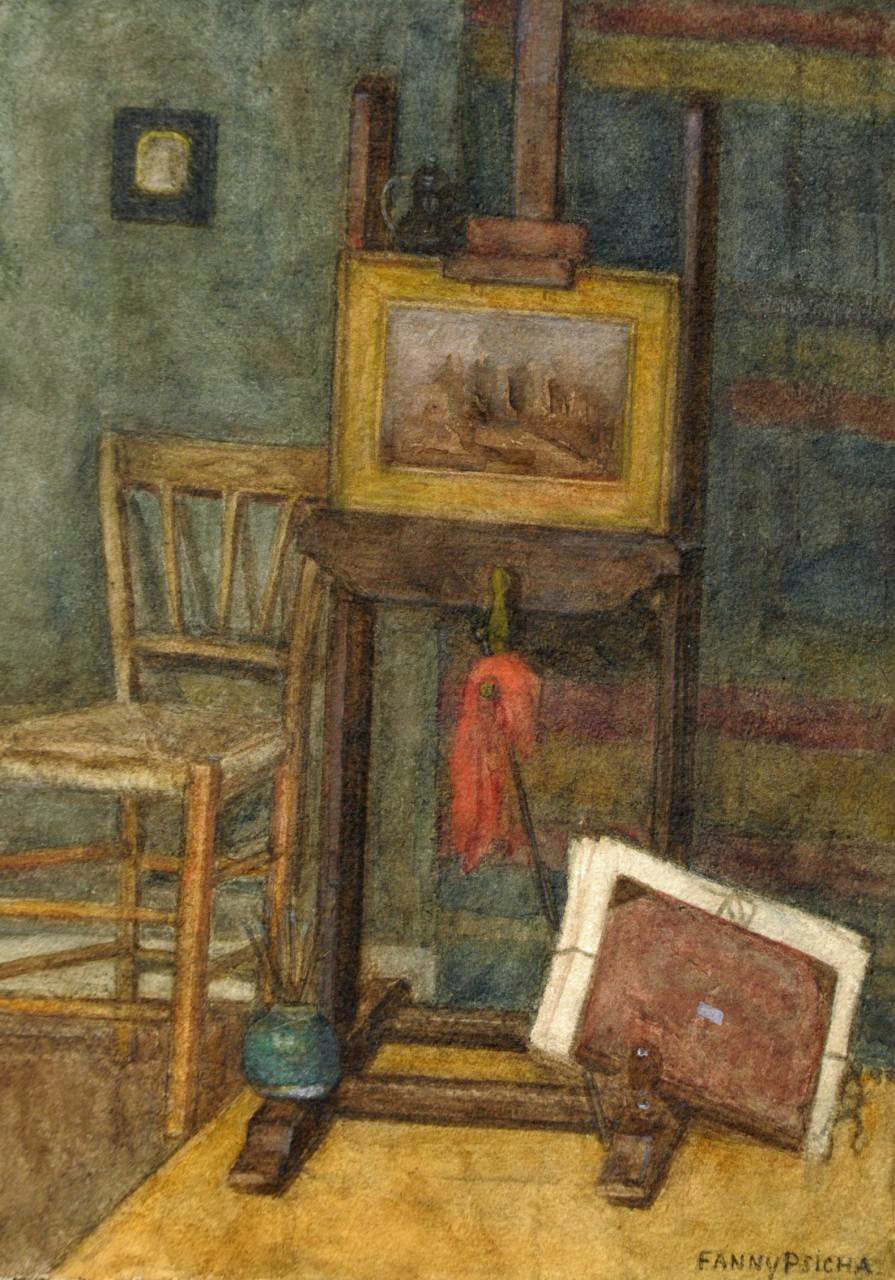
Workshop corner signed 'Fanny Psicha'

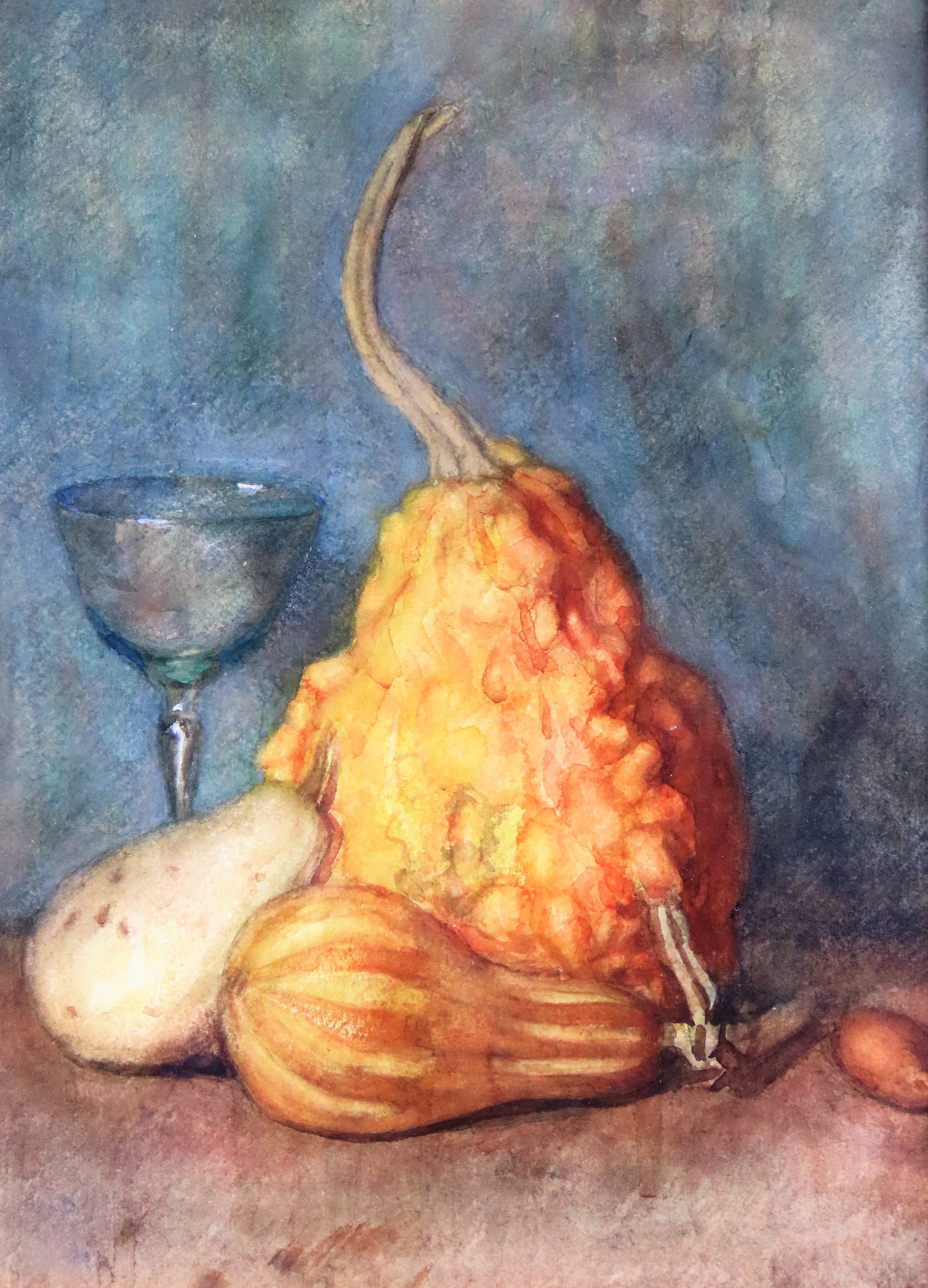
still life watercolor
