= Hendrik Haverman =

Dutch artist

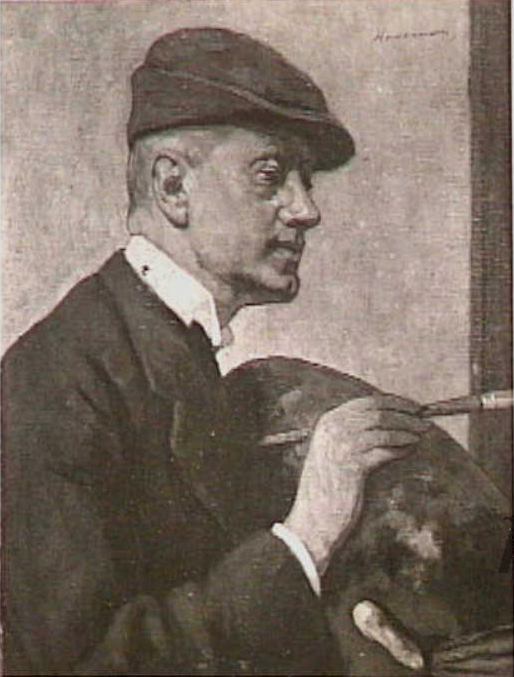
Self-portrait (date unknown)

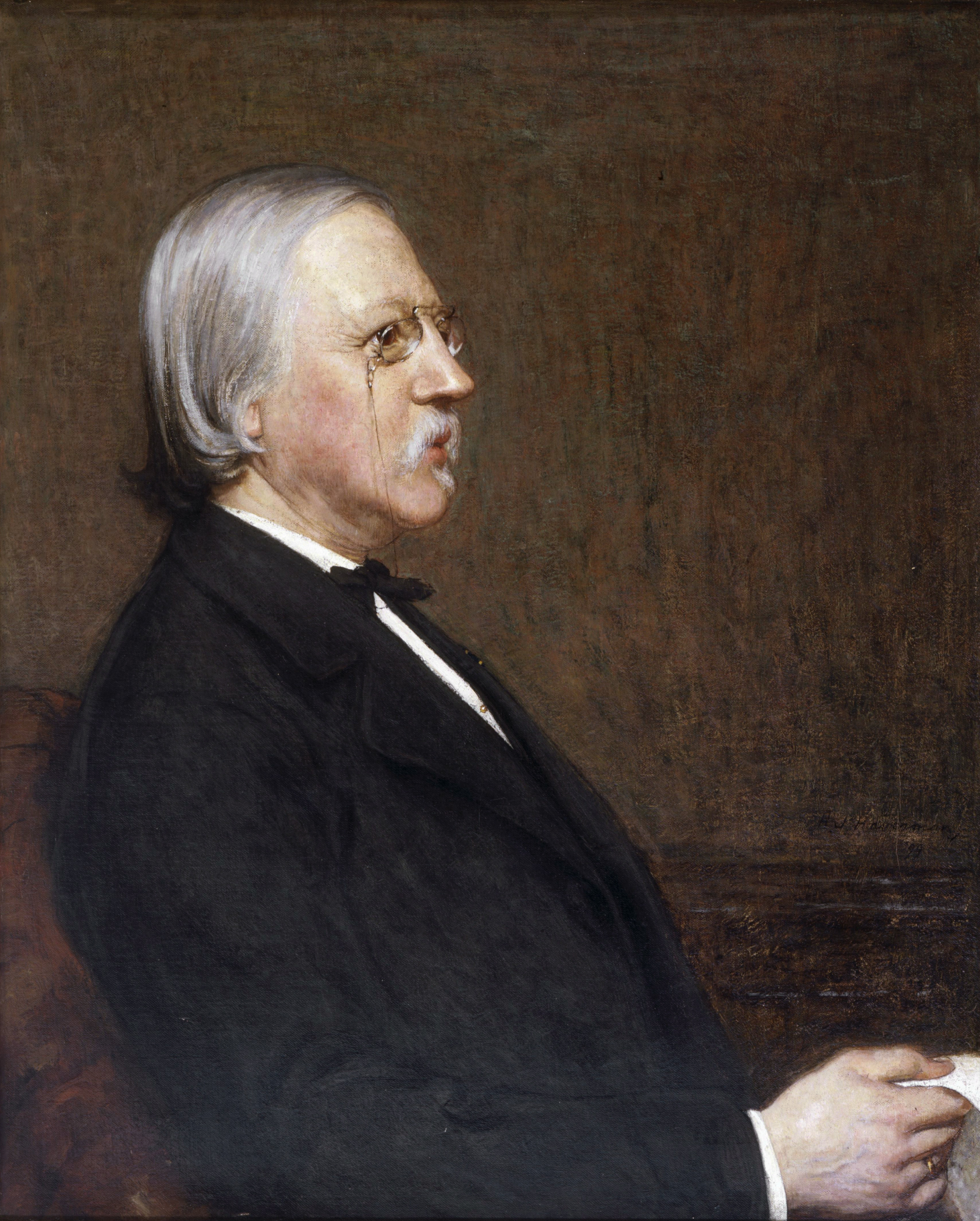
Portrait of Hendrick Peter Godfried Quack

Hendrik Johannes Haverman (23 October 1857, Amsterdam - 11 August 1928, The Hague) was a Dutch artist; known primarily for his portrait drawings.

== Biography ==
He studied at the Rijksakademie van beeldende kunsten in Amsterdam, and the art academies in Antwerp and Brussels. Among those he studied with were August Allebé and Hendrik Valkenburg (1826-1896). In his turn, he gave private lessons to Edmée Broers (1876-1955), Meta Cohen Gosschalk, Maria Adeline Alice Schweistal (1864-1950) and Pauline Suij; at a time when women were not admitted to the Rijksakademie.

In 1892, he was awarded a Royal Subsidy to sustain his work. The 1901 edition of Camera Obscura, by Nicolaas Beets, contains a portrait of the author by Haverman.

He was also an art critic and wrote numerous articles for De Gids, the oldest Dutch literary journal.

In 1918, there was a major retrospective of his works at the Pulchri Studio in The Hague. The first exhibition of his works after his death took place in 2008 at Pygmalion Visual Arts in Maarssen.

== Sources ==
- Jaap Versteegh, "De Tachtiger-schilder H.J. Haverman (1857-1928)" in: Kunst & Antiekjournaal, March 2008
- A. J. Vervoorn, "De grafiek van H.J. Haverman" in: Antiek 21 (1986/1987)
- H. de Boer, "H.J. Haverman" in: Elsevier's Geïllustreerd Maandschrift, 28 (1918)
- Jan Veth Hollandsche teekenaars van dezen tijd Rotterdam, (1905)
- Grada Hermina Marius H.J. Haverman in: Onze Kunst, 1 (1902)
- J. de Meester, "H.J.Haverman" in: Elsevier's Geïllustreerd Maandschrift, 8 (1898)
