= Zuid-Polsbroek =

Coordinates: 51.976263°N 4.85188°E

Zuid-Polsbroek was a semi-sovereign or free and high fief (Free and high fief of Zuid-Polsbroek), now part of Polsbroek in the Dutch province of Utrecht. Zuid-Polsbroek was the part of Polsbroek south of the small river Benschopse Wetering.

== History ==
When the French introduced the municipal system in the Netherlands in 1807, the rights of the heerlijkheid were largely abolished, although the heerlijkheid itself existed until the early 20th century. Zuid-Polsbroek became a separate municipality in the province of Holland. In 1812, it merged with several neighbouring villages to form one municipality "Polsbroek". Zuid-Polsbroek remained a part of Holland, even though several of the other villages in the municipality were part of Utrecht (province). It became a separate municipality again in 1817, and was transferred to Utrecht in 1820. It merged with Noord-Polsbroek in 1857 to form a single municipality Polsbroek again.

Around 1850, the municipality had a population of about 290, 140 of which lived in the village itself.

Paulus Theodorus van Brussel, painter of fruit and vegetables, was born in Zuid-Polsbroek in 1754.

== See also ==
- Polsbroek
- Noord-Polsbroek
- Free and high fief of Zuid-Polsbroek
