= Maria Leer =

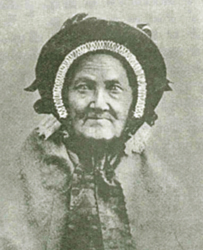
- Maria Leer
- Born: June 20, 1788; Edam, Netherlands
- Died: July 3, 1866 (aged 78); Leiden, Netherlands

Maria Leer (June 20, 1788 – July 3, 1866) was a prophetess and Dutch religious figure, one of the leaders of the Zwijndrechtse nieuwlichters (Zwijndrecht New Lighters), a religious community with communist features which opposed social conventions. With Stoffel Muller, a barge skipper, she founded Zwijndrechtse nieuwlichters, and along with assistance from Dirk Valk, a Waddinxveen bailiff.

== Early years and education ==
Maria Leer was born in 1788 in Edam, the daughter of Pieter Jansse Leer (originally from Holstein) and Anna Geertruy Gunthers (from Quakenbrück), both German Lutherans. She was the fifth of six children, and her father and mother died when she was a child. She grew up in the orphanage for poor children in Edam and received some schooling to prepare her for a position as a domestic servant.

== Career ==
She worked briefly as a maid with a Catholic family, but lost her position for trying to convert them. She later became a seamstress in Amsterdam, and there she came into contact with Stoffel Muller, a barge skipper. In 1816, they founded Zwijndrechtse nieuwlichters with the help of a Waddinxveen bailiff, Dirk Valk. The income-pooling community aimed to "revive the apostolic communism practiced at the beginning of the Christian era".

With Muller, she engaged in a "spiritual marriage". The religion held property communally and refused to accept the authority of the civil government. While Muller was considered the group's leader, he was not formally appointed as such. The group earned a living by making and selling matchsticks and was thus nicknamed the "sulfur sticks faith." At the same time, they tried to spread their faith. Because they rejected civil government they frequently faced resistance from local government. Around 1820, that led to a prison sentence for Leer, who also spent a year in the women's prison in St. George Hospital in Dordrecht.

In 1823, the brotherhood became more regulated, and Valk went his own way after that. In 1829, the group settled in Zwijndrecht, where they bought a shipyard and tried there to realize their ideals of a Christian commune. After the death of Muller in 1833, Leer tried to continue his work. But her radical views on freedom of marriage and the common property were shared by fewer and fewer members of the church. In 1843, the community was abolished and Leer moved in with her daughter Josina in Rotterdam. After Josina died in 1848, Leer found shelter with friends, and helped the sick and invalid with homemade medicine. In 1858, she moved to Leiden, where she ran a shop. From 1860, she lived in the Bethlehemhof in Leiden, where she was able to buy a house from the proceeds of the sale of the community's possession. A continued intellectual curiosity sustained her even after her banker lost her pension. At that time, she met the writer Louise Sophie Blussé, who chronicled Leer's memoirs and published them in 1892 under the pseudonym D.N. Anagrapheus. Leer died in July 1866 at the age of 78 from cholera in Leiden.
