= Paul Theodor van Brussel =

Dutch flower painter

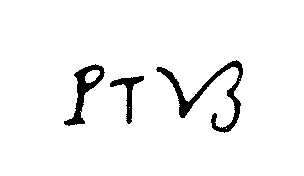
Classified signature of Paul Theodor van Brussel

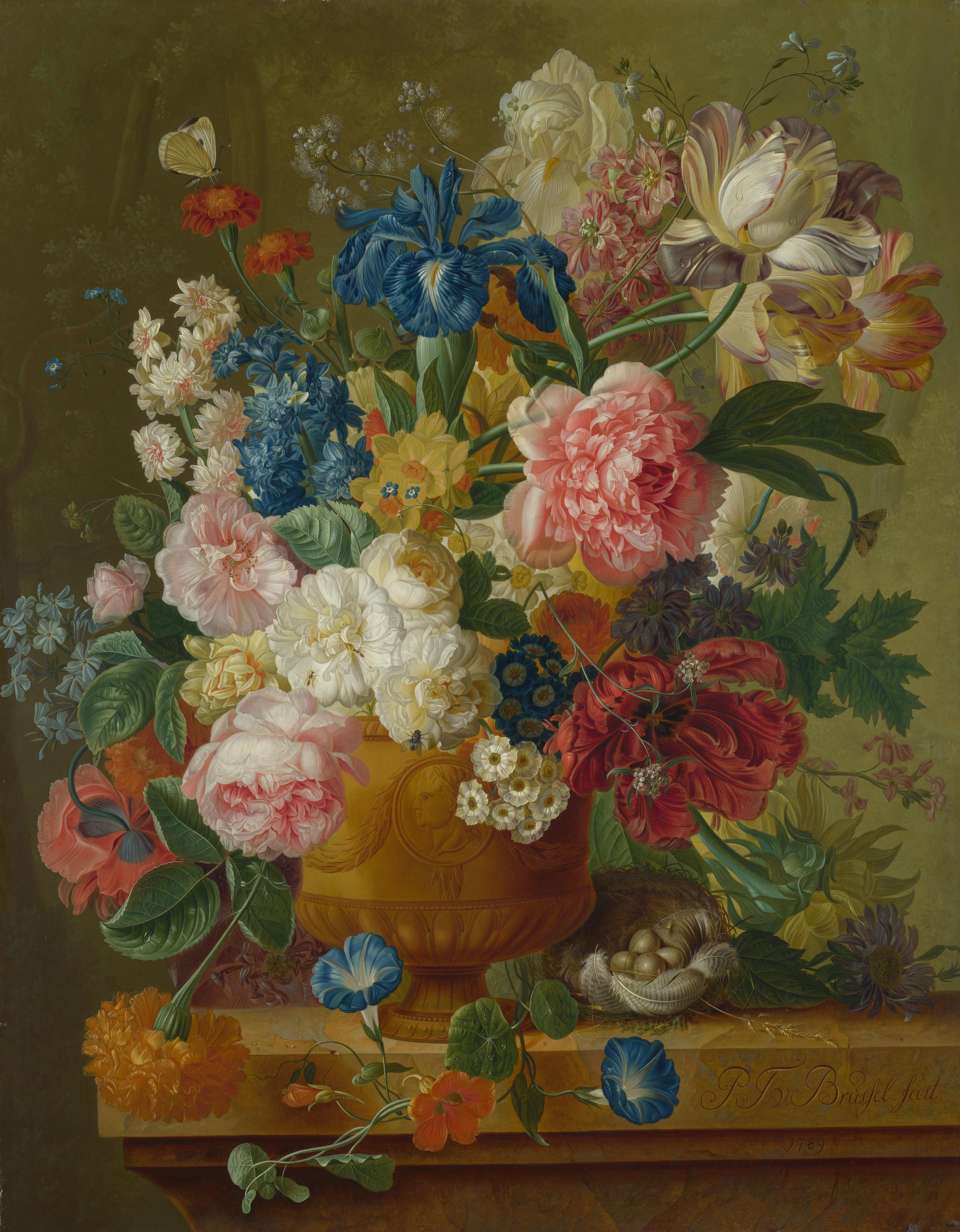
van Brussel - Flowers in a Vase

Paul Theodor van Brussel (1754–1795) was a Dutch flower painter.

He was born at Zuid-Polsbroek, near Schoonhoven, in 1754. He was a scholar of Jean Augustin and of Hendrik Meyer of Haarlem. He was first employed in the manufacture of tapestry, but afterwards devoted his attention entirely to nature, and became one of the best fruit and flower painters of his time. His later pictures are his best, and are to be found in some of the richest collections. He died at Amsterdam in 1795.
