= Louise Sophie Blussé =

Dutch writer

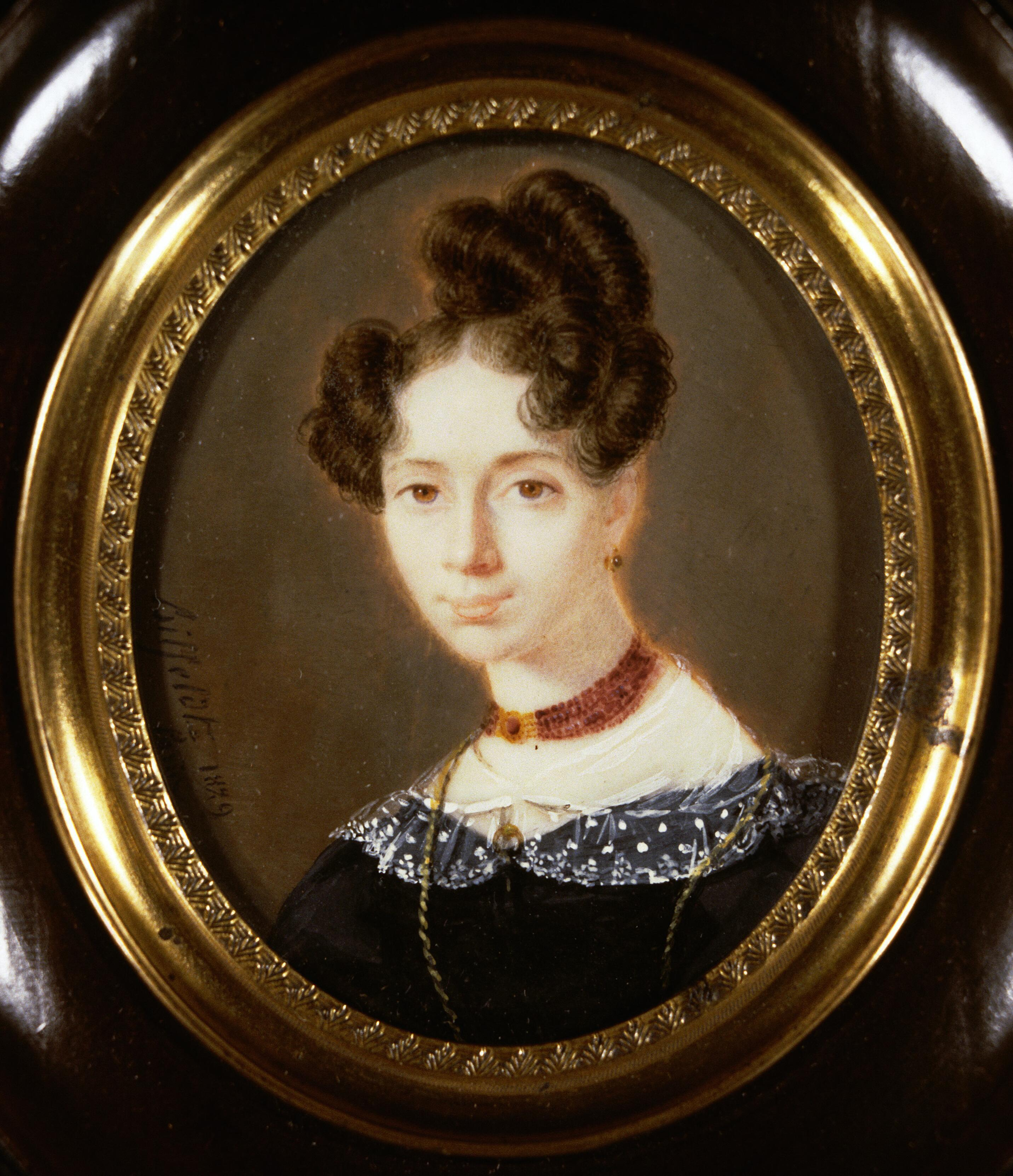
- Born: 12 January 1801; Leiden, South Holland, Netherlands
- Died: 1 April 1896 (aged 95); Leiden, South Holland, Netherlands
- Occupation: Writer
- Spouse: Caspar Reuvens (1822–1835)
- Relatives: Hugo de Vries (grandson)
- Writing career
- Pen name: D.N. Anagrapheus
- Language: Dutch

Signature
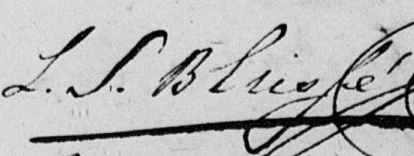

Louise Sophie Blussé (pen name, D.N. Anagrapheus; 12 January 1801 – 1 April 1896) was a Dutch writer.

Born in Leiden in 1801, Blussé was the daughter of Abraham Blussé and Jeanne Petronella Maizonnet. Her father was an editor and school inspector and a proponent of the Walloon church. Blussé married the historian and archaeologist Caspar Reuvens in Leiden on 19 July 1822. They had three children. After the death of Reuvens in 1835, Blussé lived with her parents' family in Leiden, and they collaborated on the creation of a pocket dictionary in two volumes, English-Dutch and Dutch-English, which were published in the years 1843 and 1845 respectively.

Around 1860, Blussé met Maria Leer (died 1866), who was living in a Leiden almshouse. Leer had been one of the founders of Zwijndrechtse nieuwlichters (Zwijndrecht New Lighters), a Dutch Protestant sect, which had established a commune within a boatbuilder's yard near Zwijndrecht earlier in the century. Blussé made notes of her conversations with Leer, and more than 25 years after Leer's death, Blussé decided to publish Leer's memoir. Using the pen name D.N. Anagrapheus, Blussé published the work under the title "De Zwijndrechtsche nieuwlichters (1816-1832) volgens de gedenkschriften van Maria Leer", with a foreword by the Arminian preacher Jan Hendrik Maronier (Elsevier, Amsterdam, 1892). At the time of publication, Blussé was 91 years old. In an 1892 article in De Gids, professor Hendrick Peter Godfried Quack (1834-1917) stated that, based on Blussé's description, Zwijndrechtse nieuwlichters could be characterized as a form of religious communism.

Blussé died in April 1896 at the age of 95 in her hometown of Leiden. The biologist and professor Hugo de Vries was a grandson of hers.
