= Polsbroekerdam =

- Hamlet
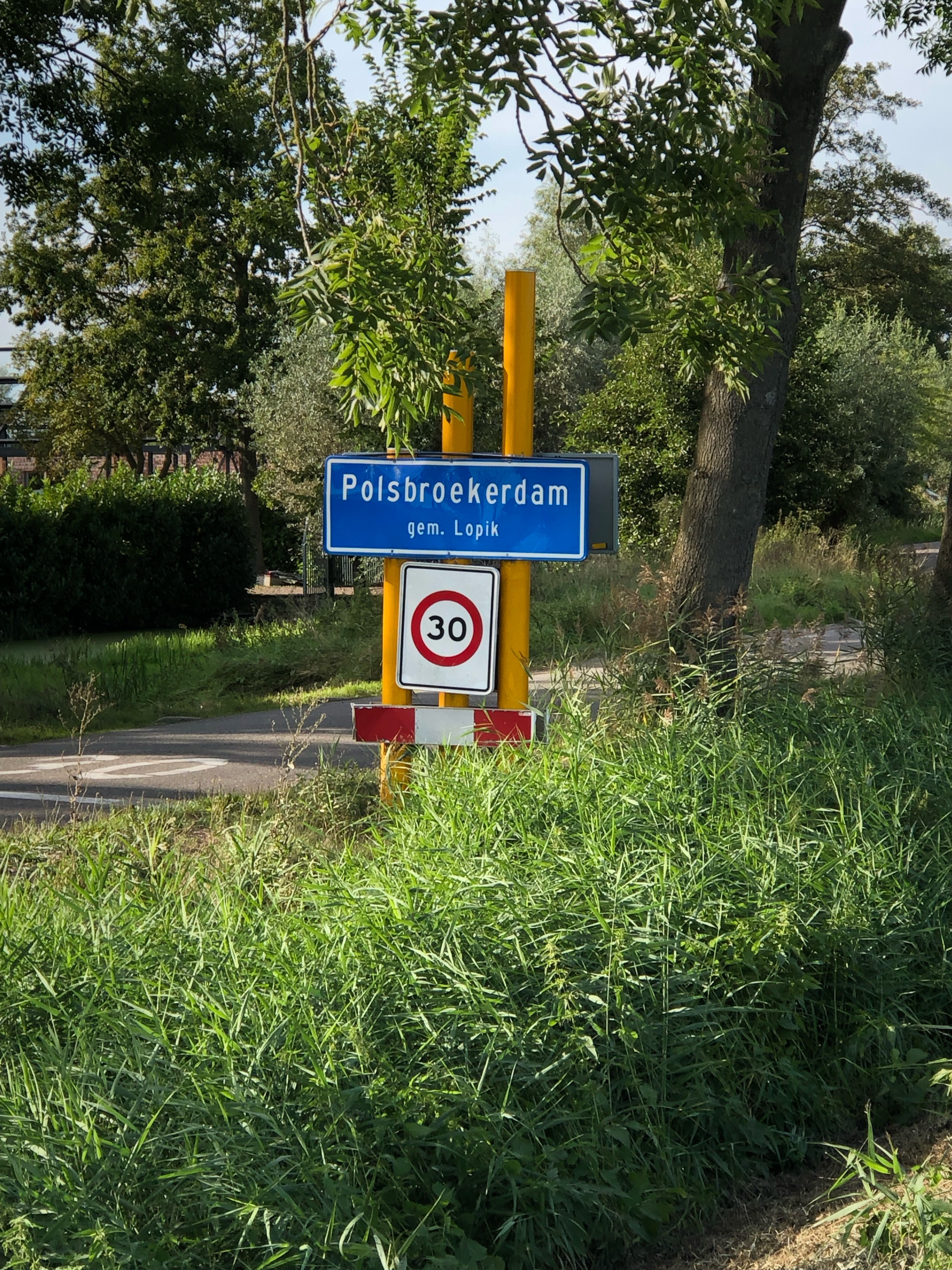
- Polsbroekerdam village entrance

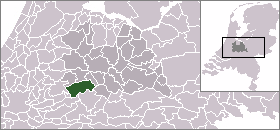
- Location of Lopik municipality in Utrecht Province

- Location of Polsbroekerdam in the Netherlands
- Country: Netherlands
- Province: Utrecht
- Municipality: Lopik
- Time zone: UTC+1 (CET)
  - Summer (DST): UTC+2 (CEST)

Polsbroekerdam is a hamlet in the Dutch province of Utrecht. It is a part of the municipality of Lopik, and is located about 10 km southeast of Gouda. The village of Polsbroek is located west of the hamlet.

== History ==
In the 19th century, Polsbroekerdam boasted two religious communities. At the start of the century, farmer Dirk Schenkel housed members of the Zwavelstokkengeloof, later called the Zwijndrechtse nieuwlichters. At the end of the century, farmer Teunis Hogendoorn housed members of a group surrounding Jannetje Hootsen from Veenendaal who were called Zwartjannetjes.

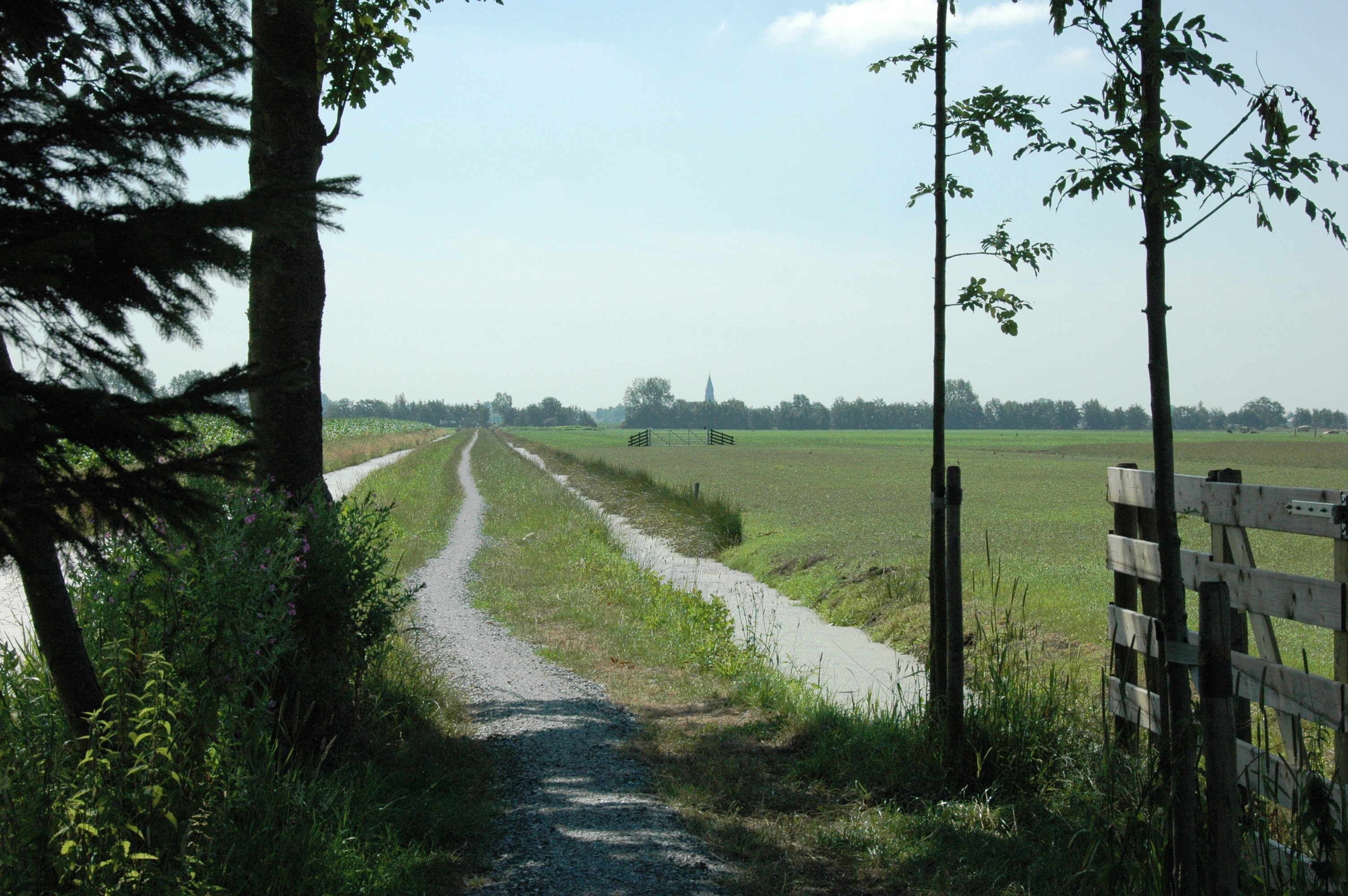
Church road Polsbroekerdam

== Notable people ==
Writer Herman de Man (1898-1946) lived in Polsbroekerdam between 1902 and 1906 and wrote about the Zwartjannetjes amongst others.
