= Hendrick Peter Godfried Quack =

Dutch legal scholar, economist and historian (1834 - 1917)

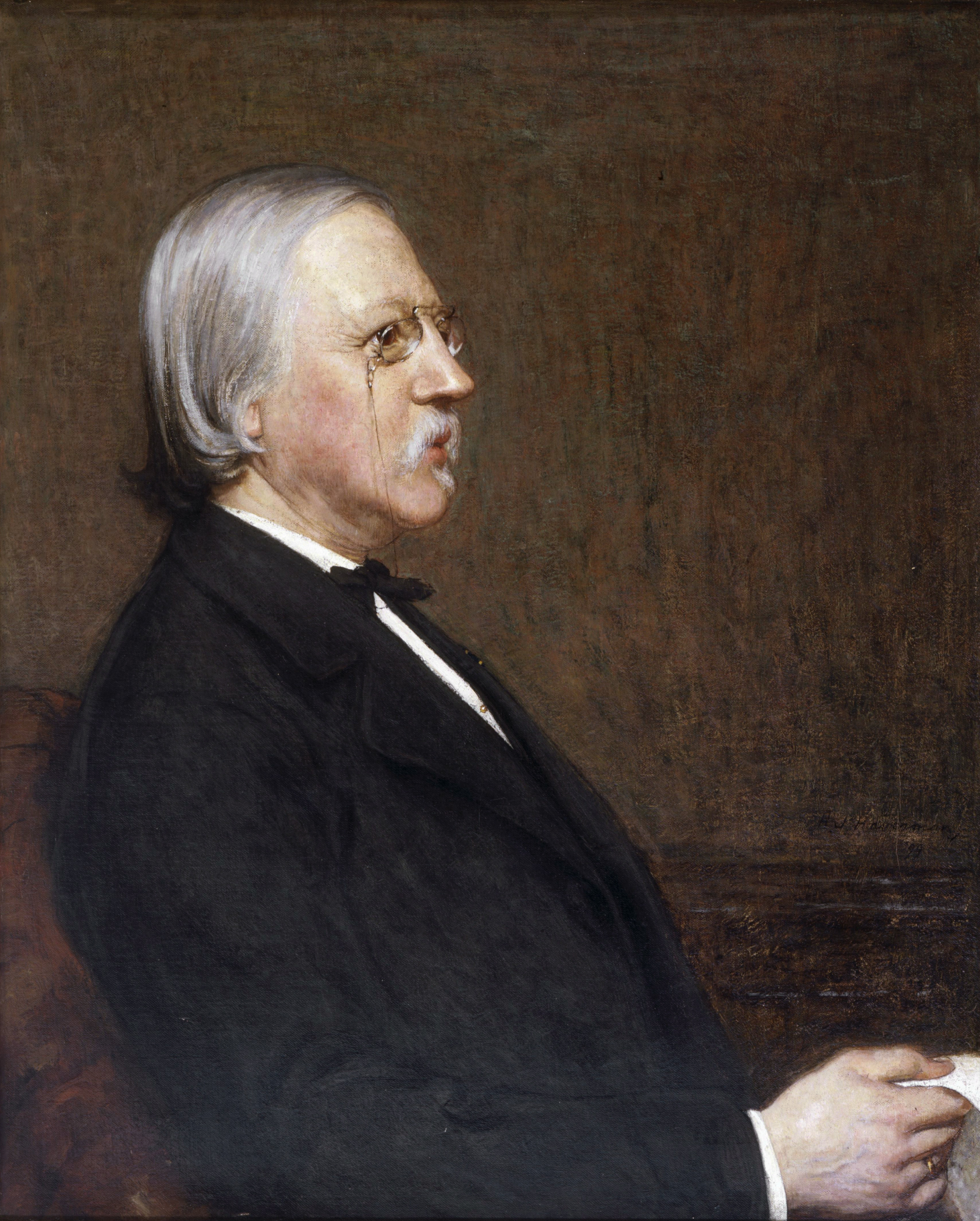
- Portrait by Hendrik Haverman (1899)
- Born: 2 July 1834; Zetten
- Died: 6 January 1917 (aged 82); Amsterdam

Academic work
- Main interests: Political economy, socialism

Hendrick Peter Godfried Quack (2 July 1834 – 6 January 1917) was a Dutch legal scholar, economist and historian, who is best known for his work De socialisten: Personen en stelsels ("The socialists: persons and systems").

== Biography ==
Quack, born on 2 July 1834 in Zetten to a beer brewer and his wife, commenced studies at Utrecht in 1853, followed by law studies in Amsterdam at the Athenaeum Illustre. In Amsterdam, he attended lectures by Jeronimo de Bosch Kemper and Martinus des Amorie van der Hoeven, both Christian critics of liberalism. Following the example of his professors, Quack became convinced that liberalism could not address the social problems of his day. He submitted a thesis about fourteenth-century statehood and earned a doctorate degree in July 1860 (from Utrecht University, because the Athenaeum Illustre lacked the right to confer such degrees).

In the following year, Quack worked as a clerk at the provincial government of North Holland, then became a journalist, and also worked for some time at the Amsterdam Chamber of Commerce. From 1860 onward, he wrote for the literary journal De Gids, of which he became an editor in 1863. In September 1863, he secured a position as a secretary of the state railway company.

Having been appointed professor of political economy at Utrecht University in 1868, Quack presented his students with socialist theories of economics besides teaching the common curriculum of the time. In 1875, he started writing his magnum opus on the history of the socialist movement, De socialisten: Personen en stelsels. The first volume of this book would appear in 1877; the last, twenty years later. Quack was elected a member of the Royal Netherlands Academy of Arts and Sciences in 1877. Also in 1877, Quack left his academic position, to be succeeded by Johan d'Aulnis de Bourouill, and took a job at De Nederlandsche Bank. He proceeded with his historical work, and in fact one of the reasons for switching jobs was the increase in salary, which he needed to buy more books for his studies. Quack was to join the board of directors of De Nederlandsche Bank in 1885, also becoming professor extraordinaire (Note: Dutch: Buitengewoon hoogleraar, a type of professorship in the Dutch academic system.) of the history of political economy at the University of Amsterdam, which he remained until 1894.

Although a critic of economic liberalism, Quack never joined any of the socialist currents, although he did attend the 1872 Congress of the International. Nor did he join any other political current: he felt related to liberals, in particular Cort van der Linden, but disliked their individualism of the classical liberals; he admired socialists' ideals, but not what he considered their "breeding of mistrust and hate" as a means to realize them; he considered himself a democrat and the politician whom he considered closest to his own ideal was a progressive liberal such as Johannes Tak van Poortvliet. He has been described as a "cathedral socialist" with Saint-Simonist ideas. According to Ferdinand Domela Nieuwenhuis, with whom Quack exchanged some letters, Quack lacked either courage or drive, and with these qualities, he might have become "our Lassalle". Theory and practice were in a state of tension in Quack's life: during the 1903 railroad strikes, he was president of the board of the state railroad company and supported the firing of 11% of the company's personnel. In his memoir, he recalled this episode as "the most cruel page of the book of my life", but still defended the decision.

Quack died on 6 January 1917 in Amsterdam.

== Works ==
De socialisten. Personen en stelsels (three volumes, 1877–1897, Amsterdam; reprinted 1977) is considered Quack's main work. It is a compendium of biographies of early socialists, including many forgotten thinkers, based on Quack's study of primary sources.

Other works include:

- Martinus des Amorie van der Hoeven (1864, Amsterdam)
- Traditie en Ideaal in het volksleven (1872, Utrecht)
- Studiën en schetsen (1886, Amsterdam)
- Uit de kring der gemeenschap (1899)
- Herinneringen (1913)
