= Edam, Netherlands =

Town in the northwest Netherlands

Edam
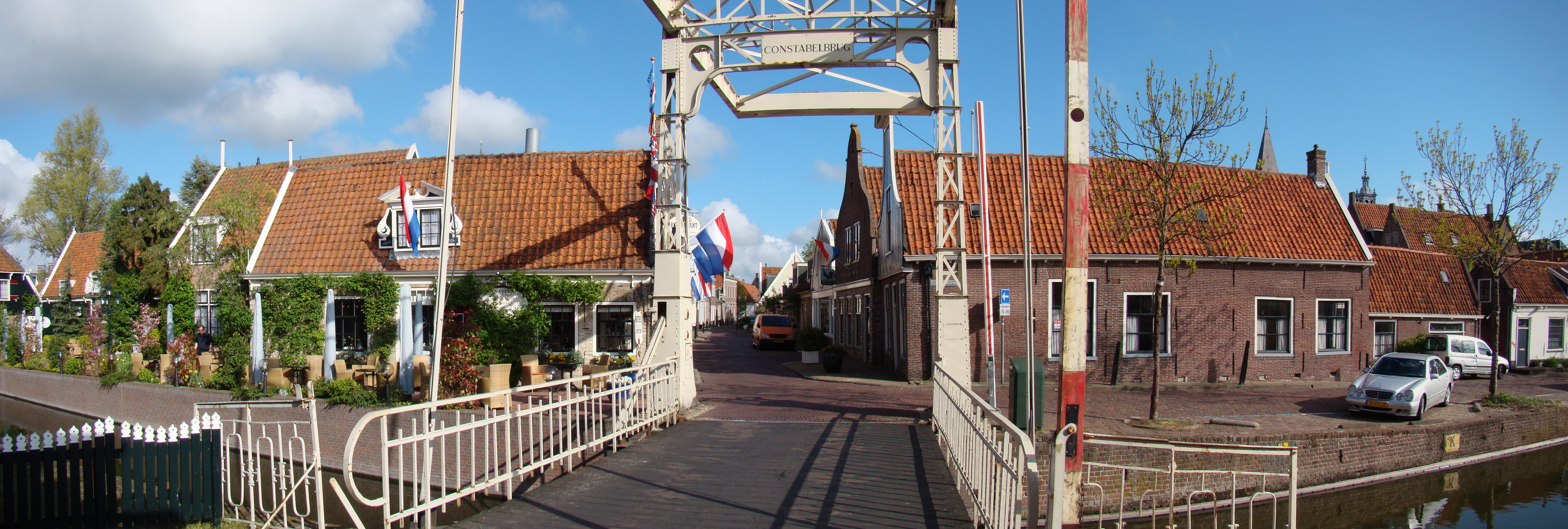
- Edam in 2010

- Flag Coat of arms

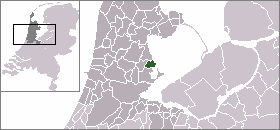
- Coordinates: 52°31′N 5°03′E
- Country: Netherlands
- Province: North Holland
- Municipality: Edam-Volendam

Population
  - Total: 7,380
  - Density: 1,422/km^{2} (3,680/sq mi)
- Website: edam-volendam.nl

Edam (Dutch pronunciation: [eːˈdɑm]) is a city in the North Holland province of northwestern Netherlands. Combined with Volendam, Edam forms the municipality of Edam-Volendam. Approximately 7,395 people live in Edam. The entire municipality of Edam-Volendam has 37,124 inhabitants. The name Edam originates from a dam on the little river E or IJe where the first settlement was located and which was therefore called IJedam.

Edam is famous as the original source of the cheese with the same name.

== History ==
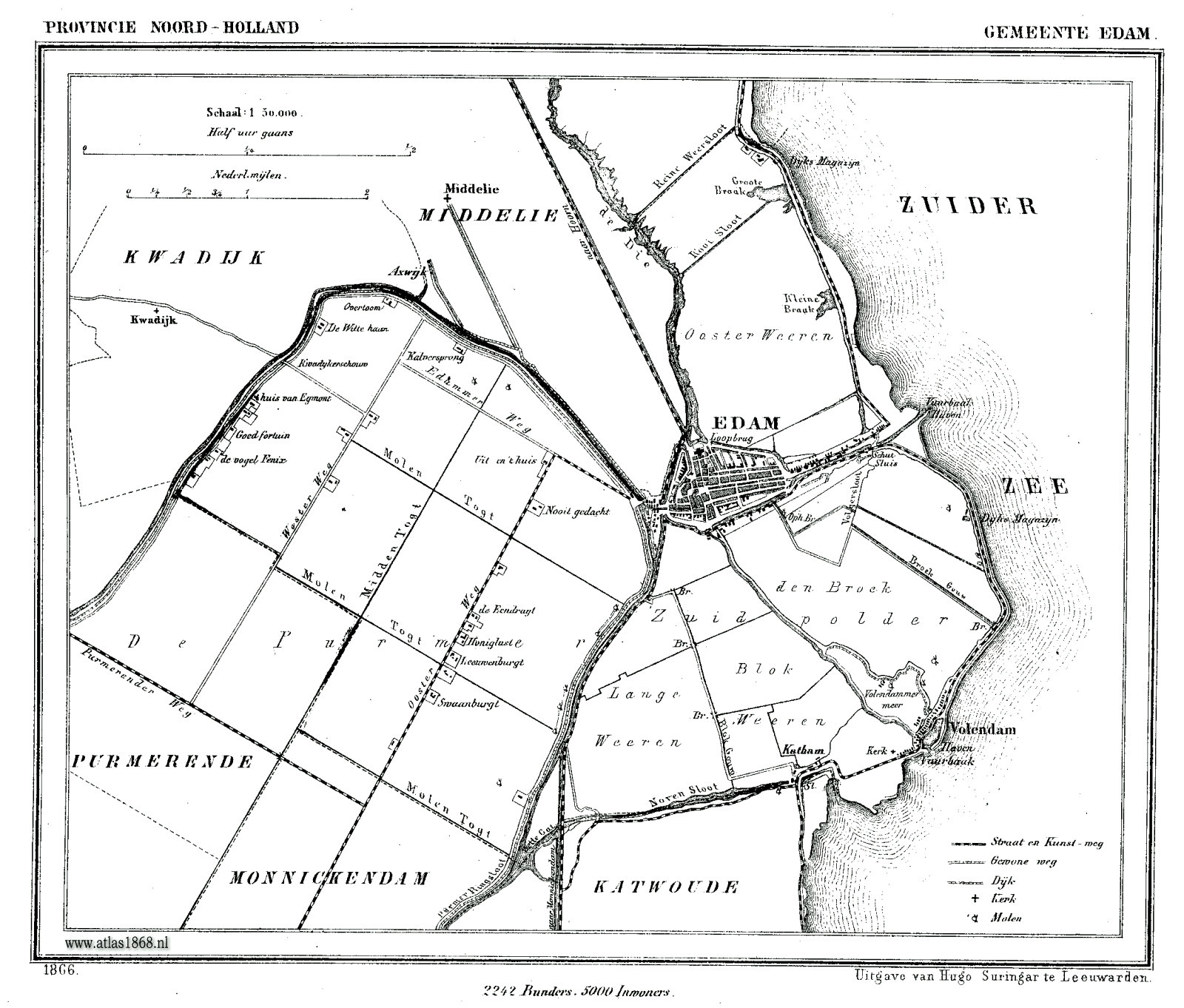
Old map Edam c. 1866

The town of Edam was founded around a dam crossing the river E or IJe close by the Zuiderzee, now known as the IJsselmeer. Around 1230 the channel was dammed. At the dam goods had to be transferred to other vessels and the inhabitants of Edam could levy a toll. This enabled Edam to grow as a trade town. Shipbuilding and fishing brought Edam more wealth.

Count Willem V of Holland granted Edam rights as a borough in 1357. One of the reasons he did that was because of the war between the Hoeken and the Kabeljauwen. They fought a battle for the rule over the towns of Holland.

Thanks to their rights as a borough, the people of Edam transferred make a new harbour. The building of the new harbour gave Edam connections to the major cities in Holland and the international trading routes. By the 16th century there were as many as 33 wharves in Edam, which, along with the fact that Edam was also granted the right to hold a market three times every year, provided a great boost to the local economy – making it one of the more important towns of North Holland, vying with Enkhuizen, Hoorn and Amsterdam.

However, the open sea mouth caused flooding problems in the hinterland and in 1544 the Emperor Charles V gave orders to close the harbour with lock gates, which were built in the town centre in 1569. This resulted in the harbour silting up and the ship building industry went into a decline by the end of the 17th century.

The cheese market was the primary resource of the economy of Edam in the 16th century. On 16 April 1526 Emperor Charles V gave Edam the right to have a market every week. In 1594 this right was given in perpetuity by Prince Willem I as a mark of his appreciation for the town's support during the Siege of Alkmaar.

== The old city centre ==
The old town centre, within the borders of the old city walls, is nowadays protected by the government, both the main structures and architectural details. A number of notable buildings survive in good condition.

=== St. Nicolas church ===
Grote Kerk or St. Nicholaaskerk, of cathedral dimensions, was probably built at the beginning of the 15th Century. In both 1602 and 1699 the church suffered extensive fires after lightning strikes to the tower. Consequently, when rebuilt (in 1701) the height of the tower was significantly reduced. St Nicholas church is one of the largest 3-ridged churches in Europe. Built on piles, the weight of the church was an important consideration and the vaulted ceiling is a wooden copy of a stone ceiling. The church also contains many stained glass windows donated as gifts from neighbouring towns or by the flourishing Edam guilds (such as the guild of ships' carpenters) after the fire in 1602.

=== The town hall ===
Built in 1737 the town hall is on a somewhat larger scale than the rest of Edam. The entrance with its heavy double doors and sandstone surrounds are in the Louis XIV style and a wooden tower completes the picture. The town hall is still in active use for marriage ceremonies.

=== The Edam Museum ===
Opposite the Town hall, across the dam, is Edam's oldest brick house. This was built around 1530 as a private house and converted to a museum in 1895. The house represents typical Dutch construction of the period, and the internal layout is completely original. The house has a deeper kitchen with mezzanine living quarters above it. The kitchen leads to a floating cellar; a brick box room floating freely on ground water. According to folklore the cellar was built by a sea captain who missed the sea. However, it is more likely that cellar was built simply to keep the contents dry, while at the same time not requiring waterproof foundations.

=== Carillon ===
Records suggest that the Church of Our Dear Lady was present on the site since 1350 and its tower dates from the 15th and 16th centuries. Though the church was demolished in 1882 the late Gothic Carillon tower survives. In 1972 the tower threatened to fall, but it was shored up with steel girders and subsequently completely restored. The bells, protruding from the open lantern, were made by Pieter van den Ghein in 1566 and still ring out a short melody every 15 minutes. This melody may be varied: for example typical Saint Nicholas songs ring out on December 5.

== Cheese market ==
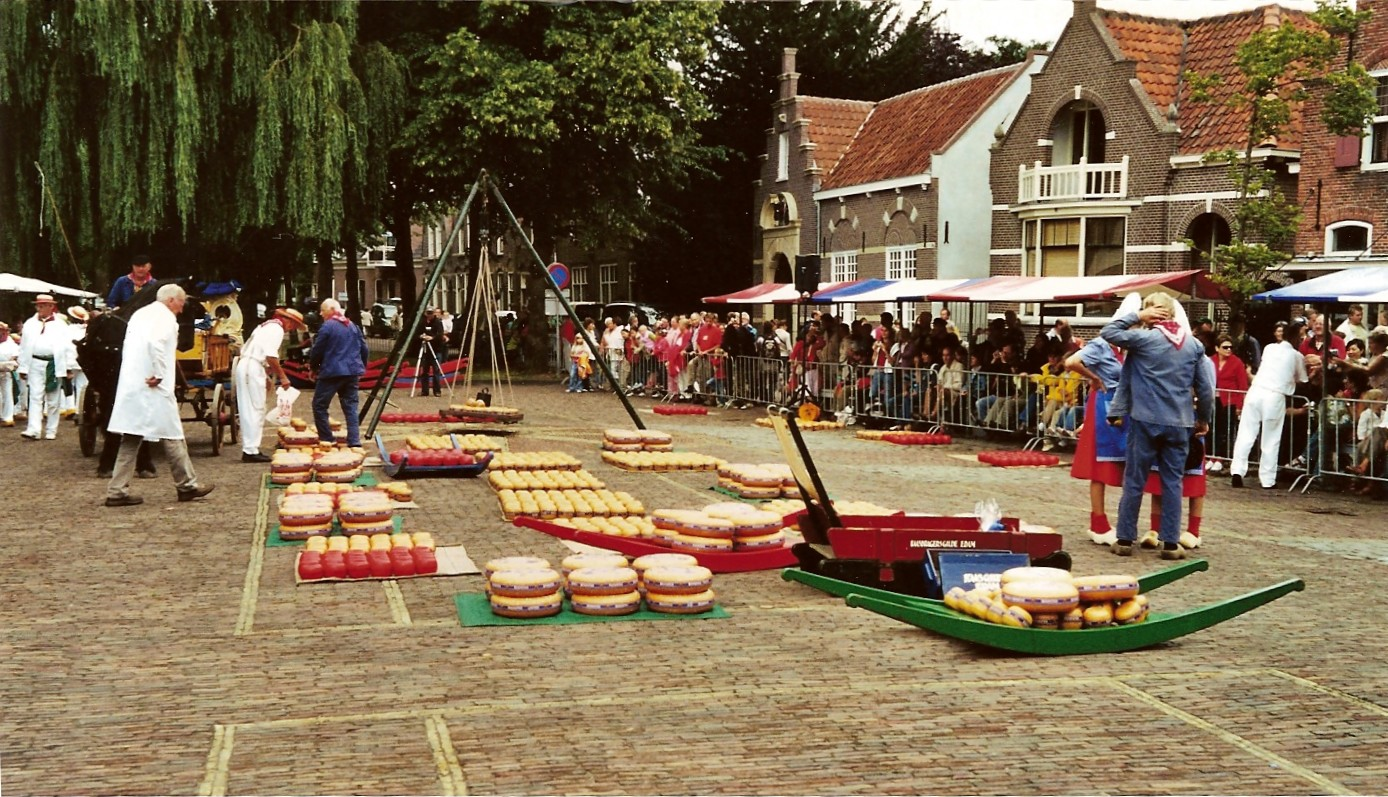
Cheese market in Edam, August 2006.

After Edam was granted the right to have weekly markets, commercial cheese markets stayed(?) in the town until 1922. The cheese was brought to the market by local farmers on little boats, and when the cheese was lifted out of the boats it was carried to the market by cheese sledges. At the market, the cheese was shown to the merchants. After being tested for their quality, the price was settled by haggling until there was agreement. After that, the cheese was brought to a warehouse where it was kept until the quality was at its best.

Since 1989, the cheese market in Edam has been revived as a re-enactment for tourists. It is held on each Wednesday in July and August.

== Images ==
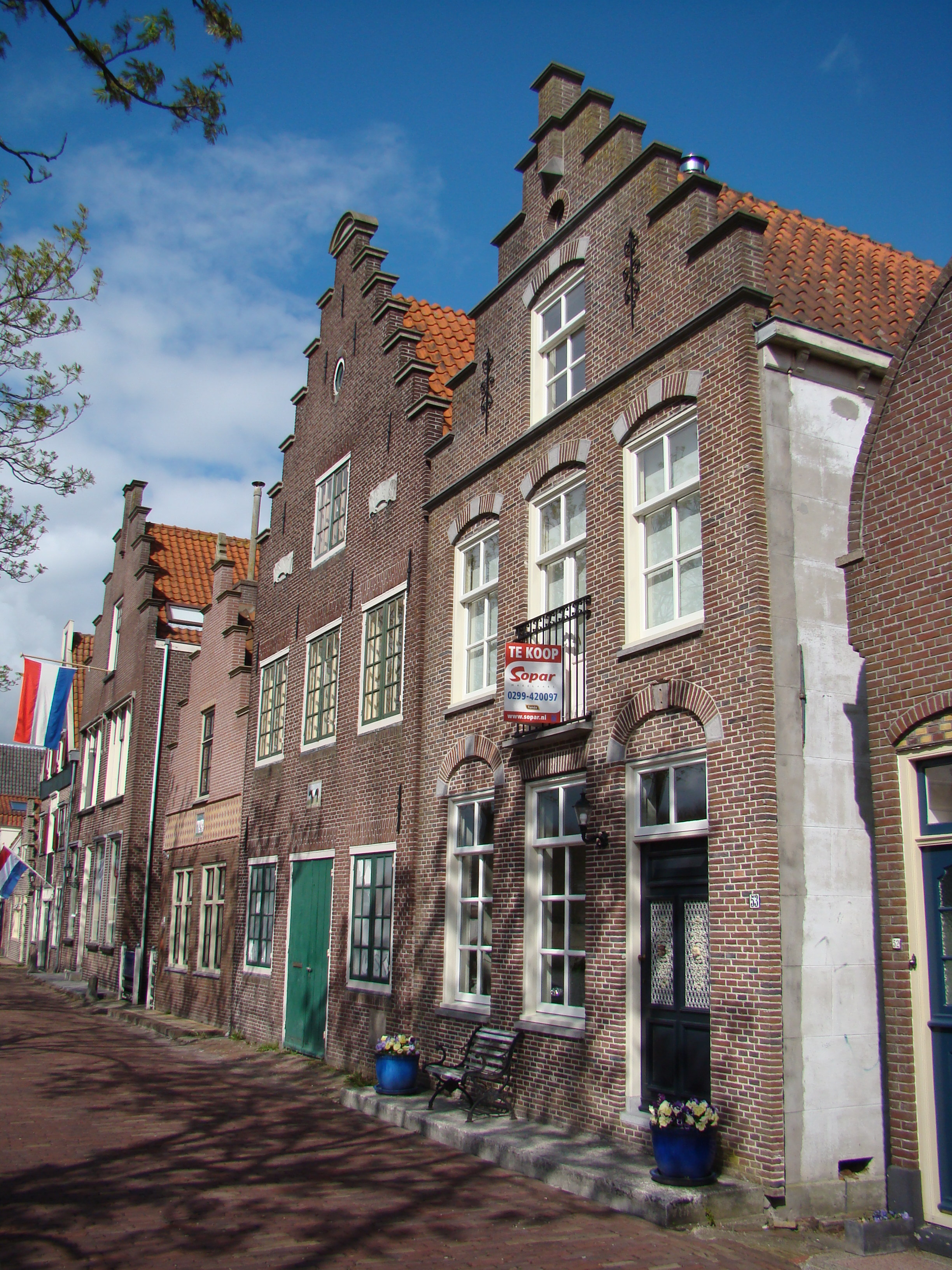
A street view with houses, Edam.

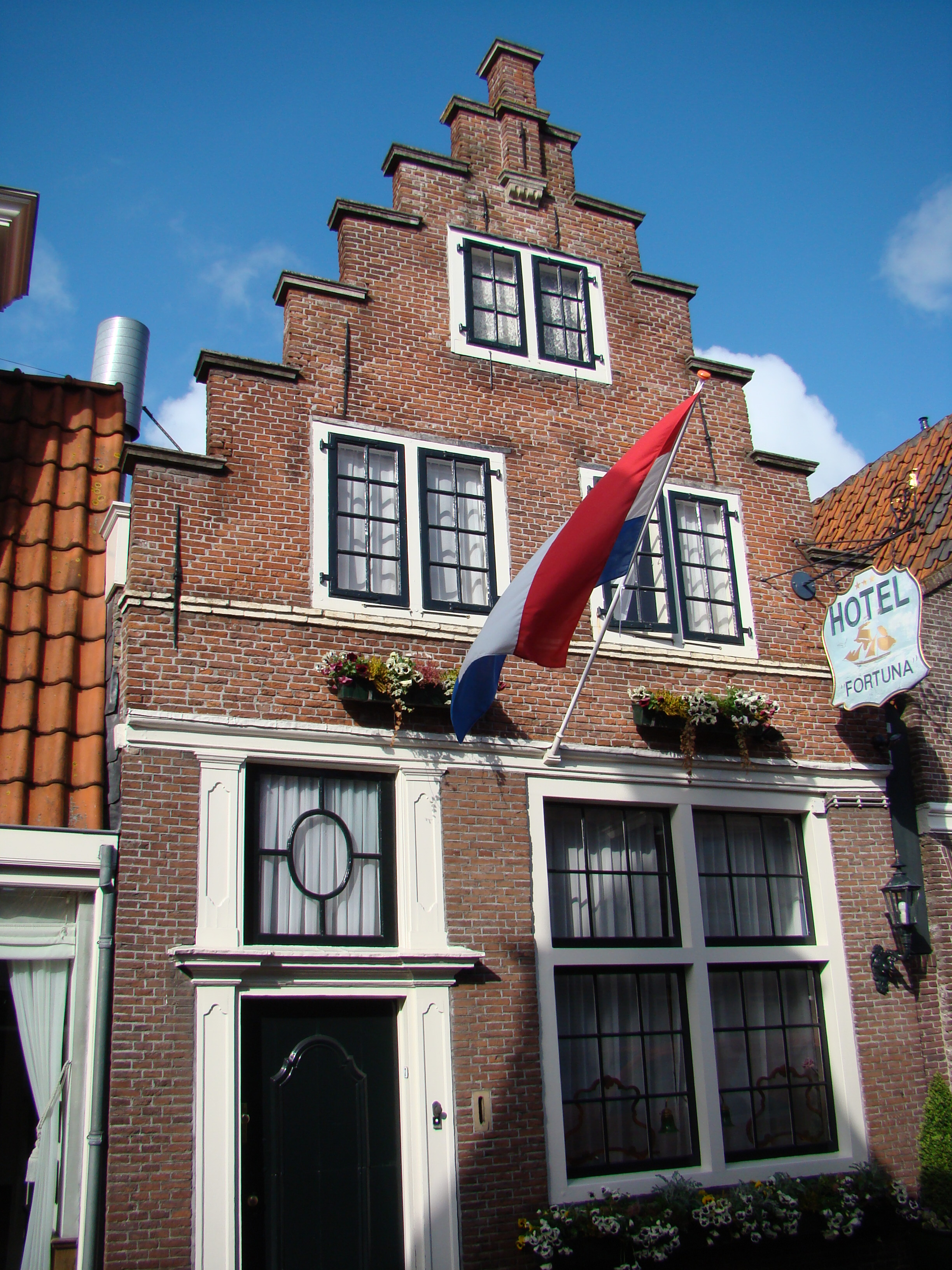
A street view with houses, Edam.

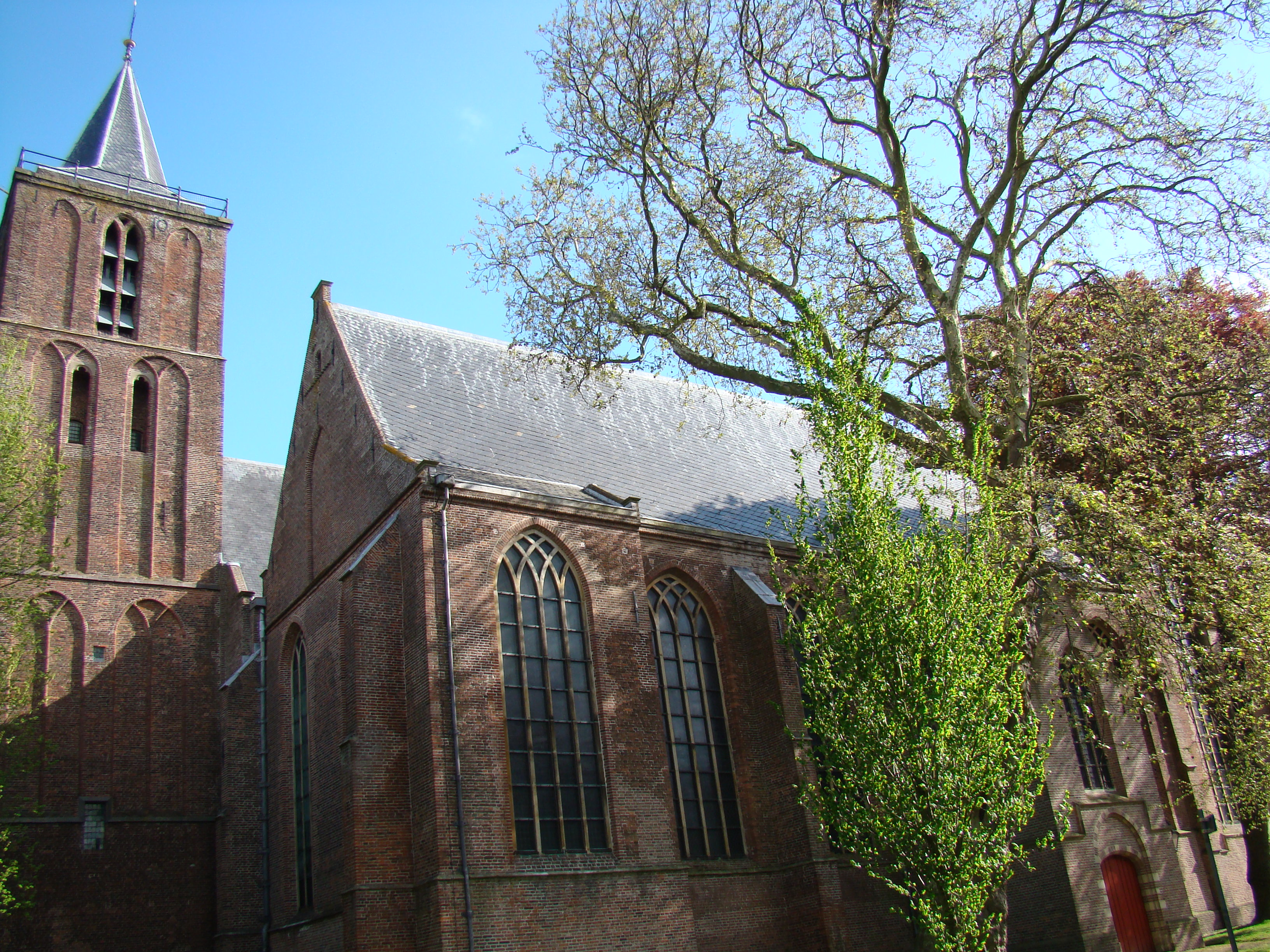
A view of a church in Edam (Grote of Sint-Nicolaaskerk).

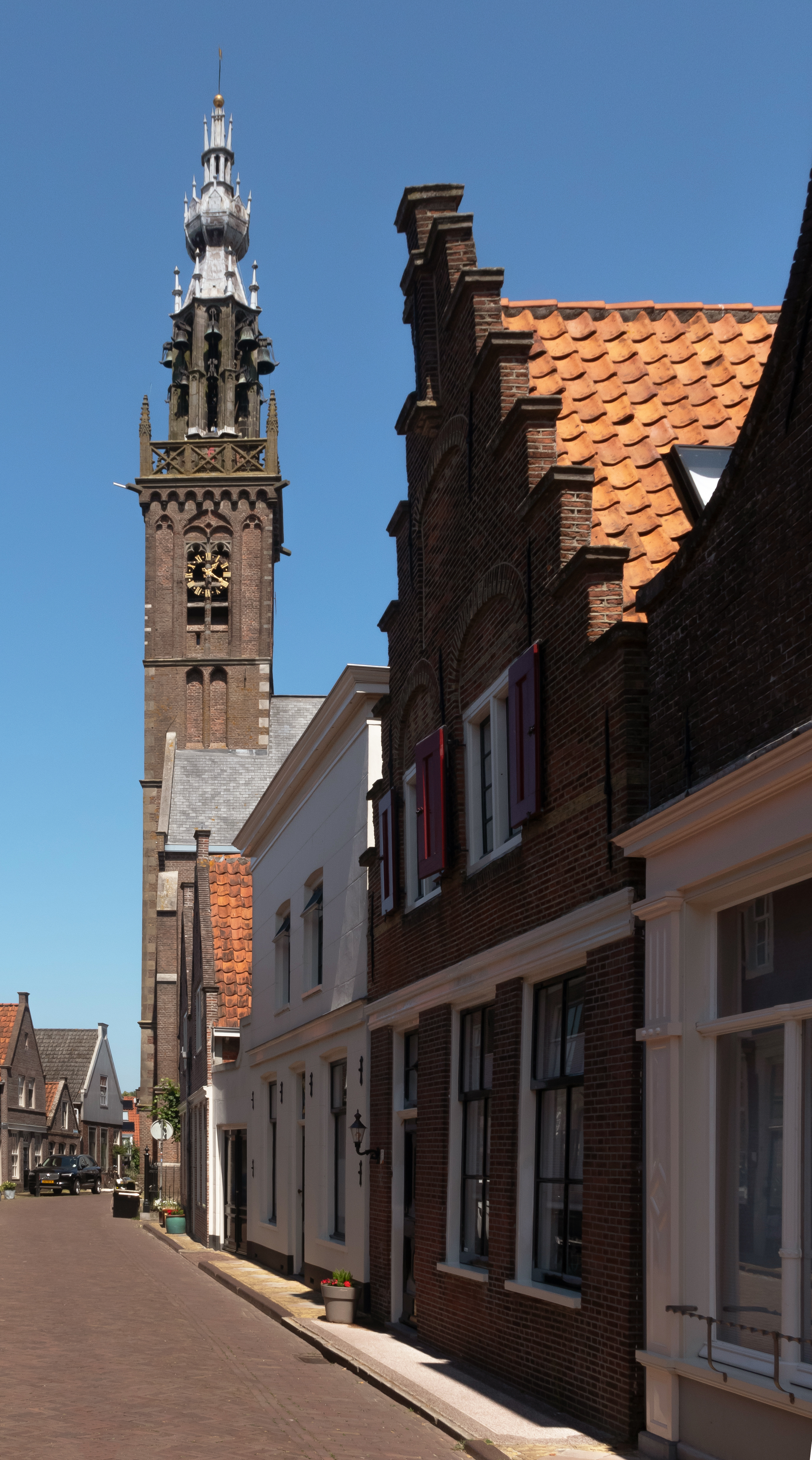
Edam, the Speeltoren (churchtower of the former Onze-Lieve-Vrouwekerk).

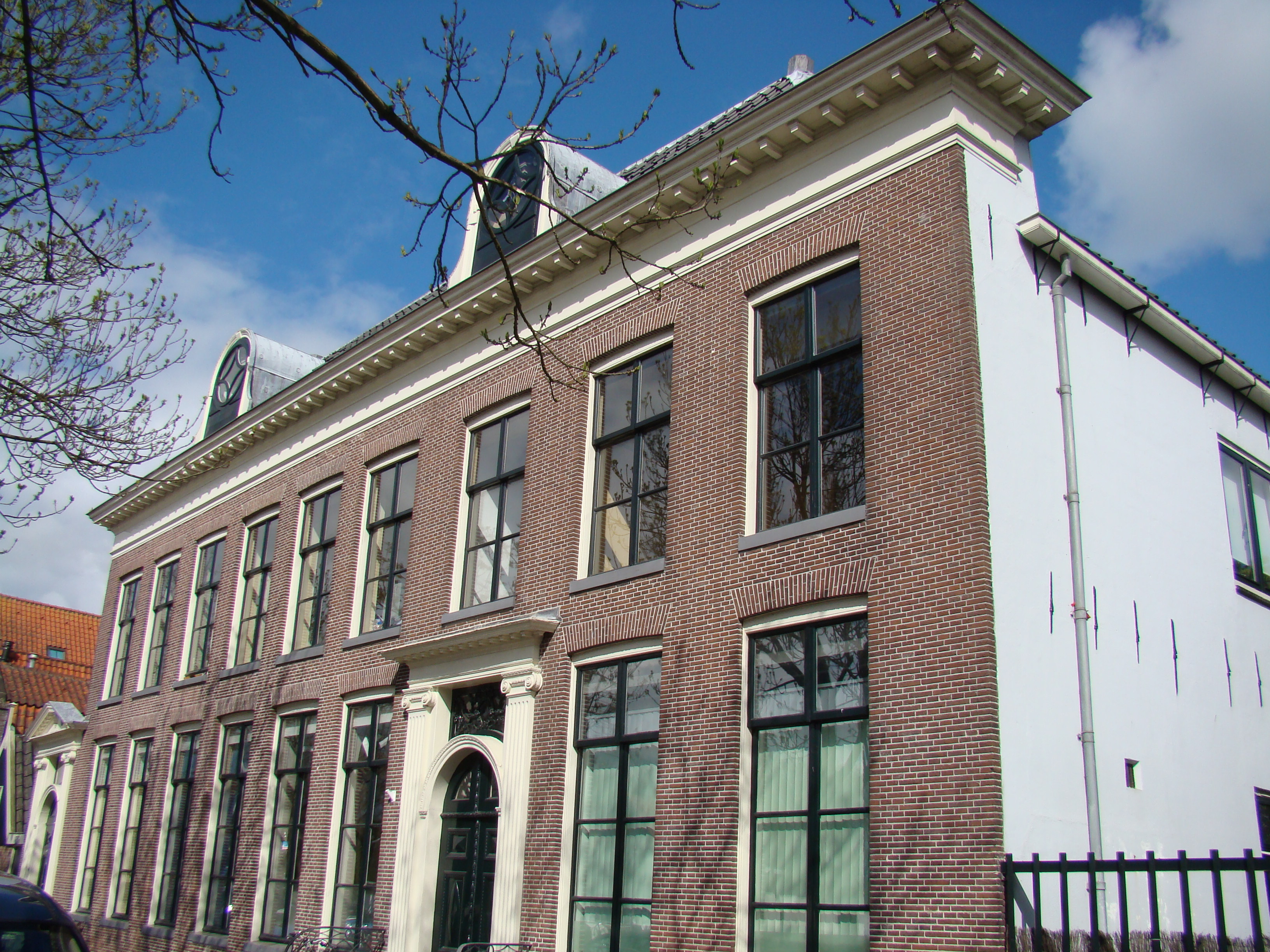
A street view of a building in Edam.

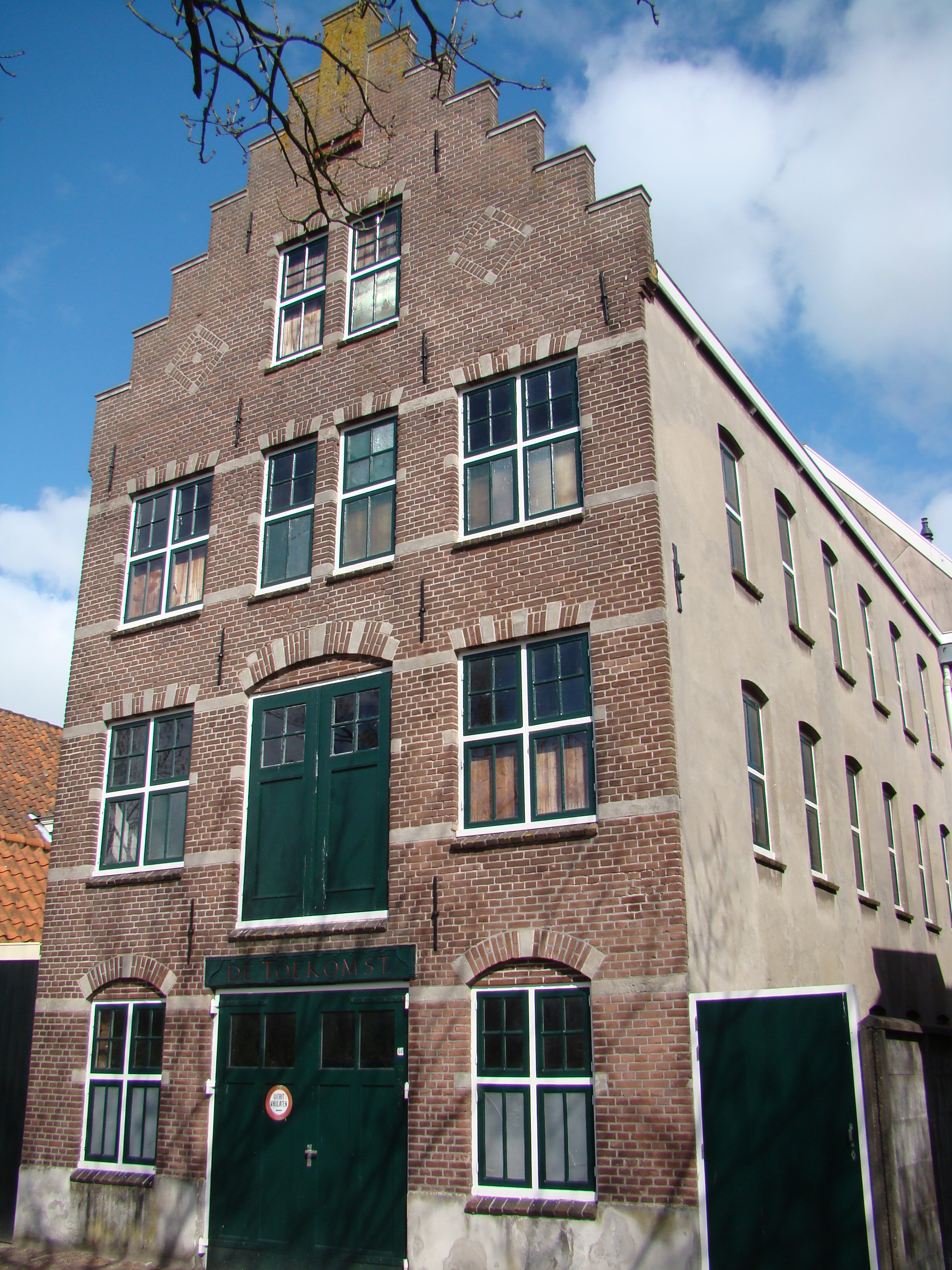
A street view of a building in Edam.

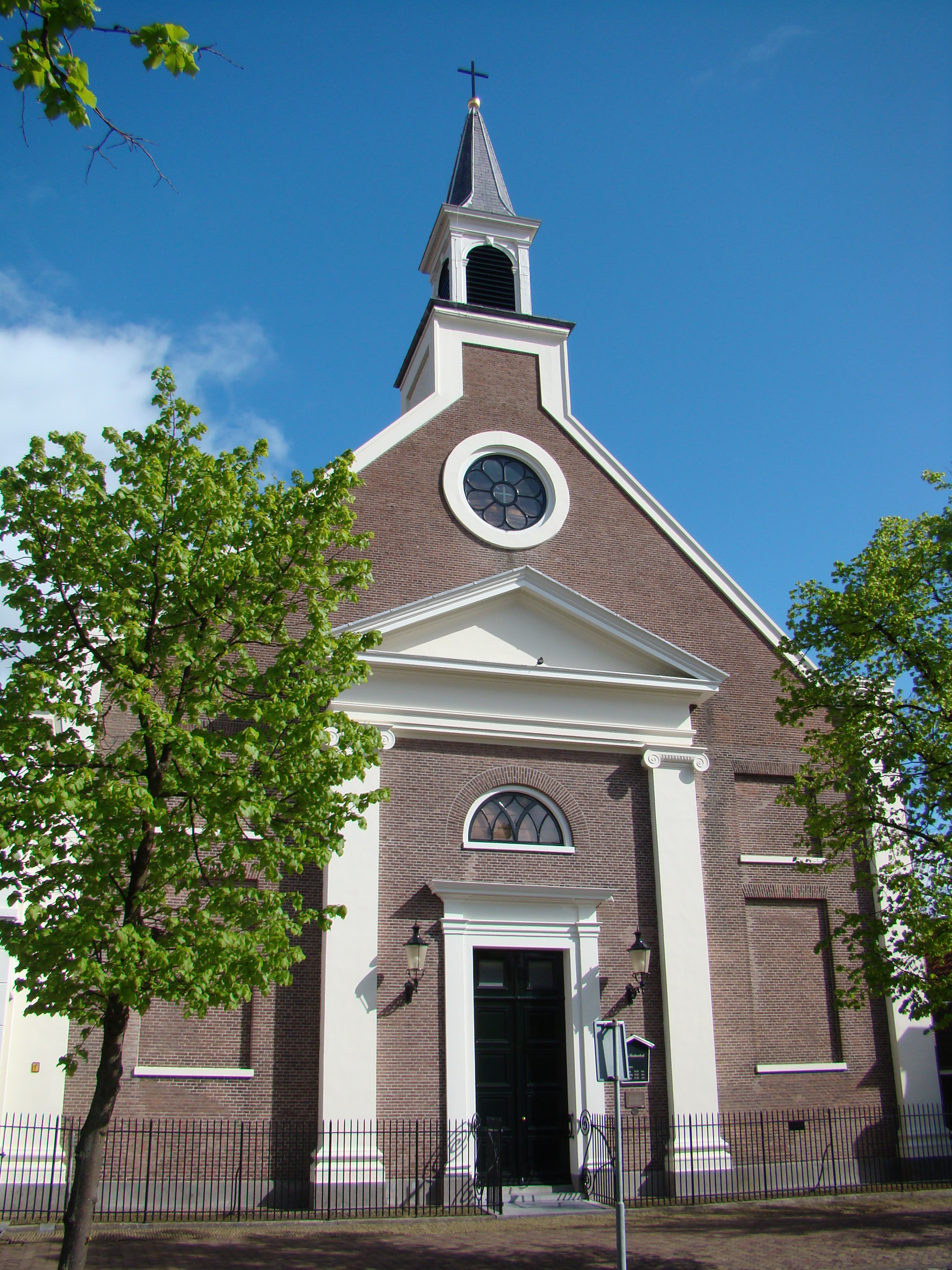
Heilige Nicolaaskerk, Edam.

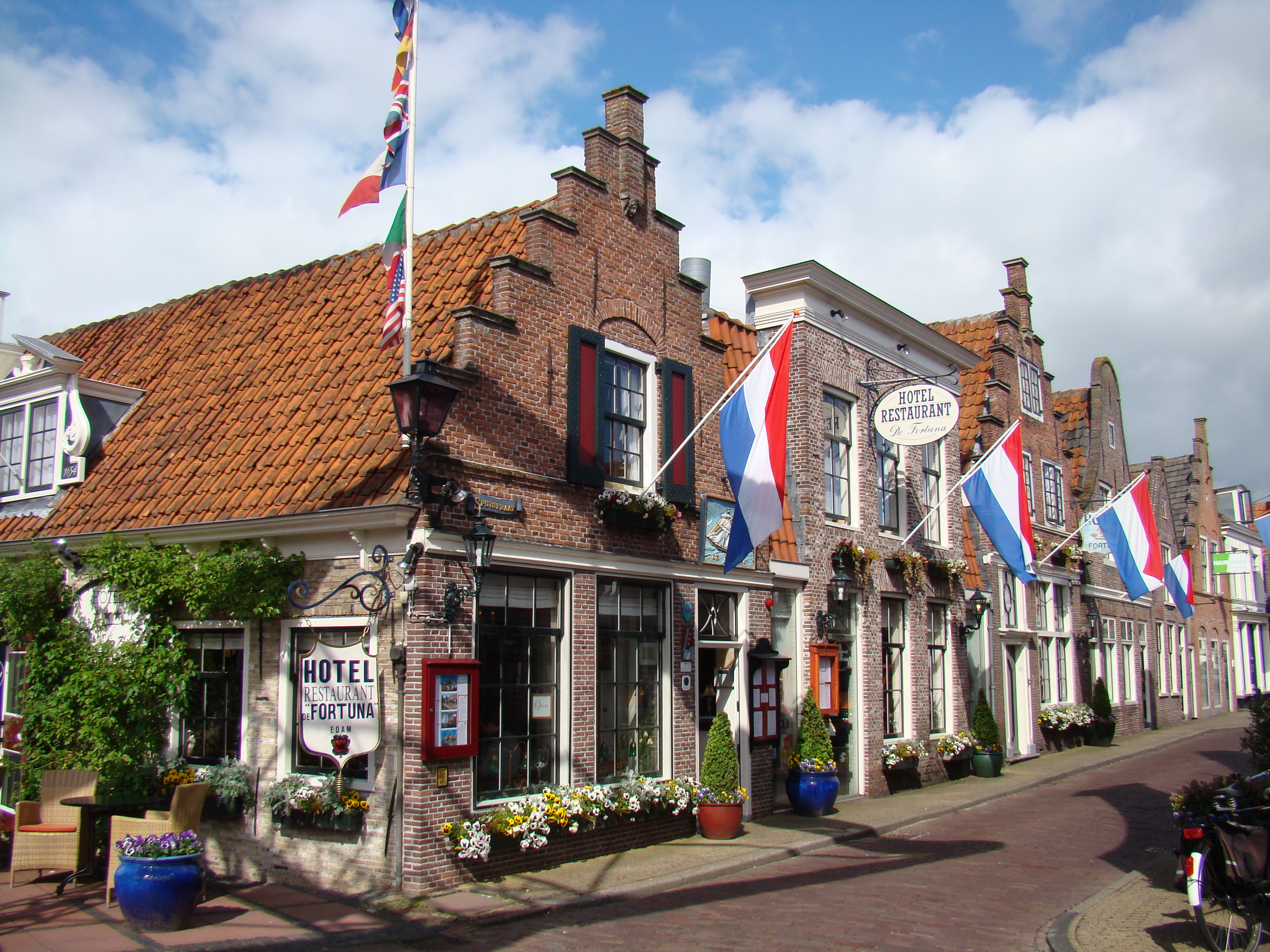
A view of a street in Edam.

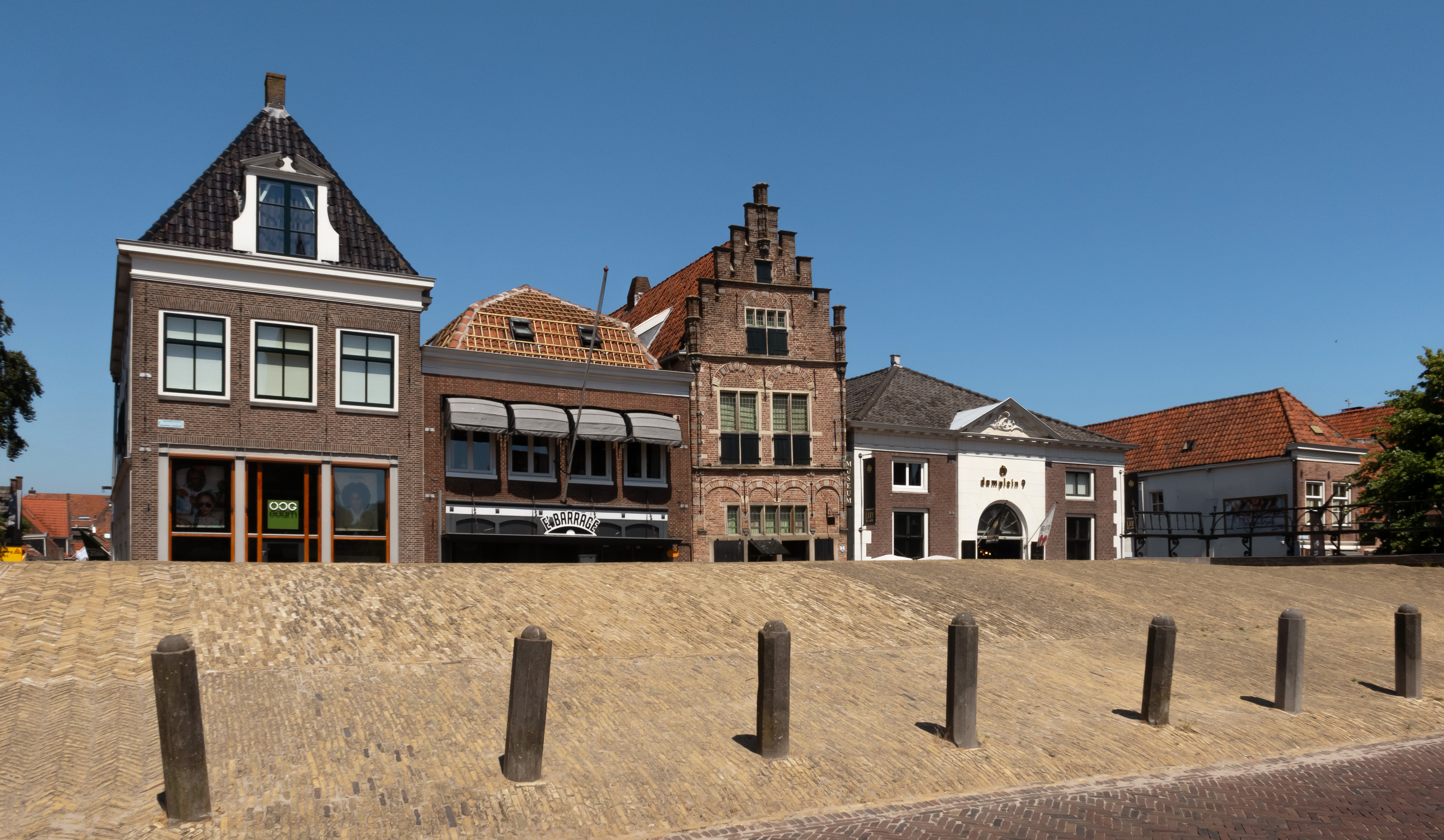
Het Damplein, a town square in Edam.

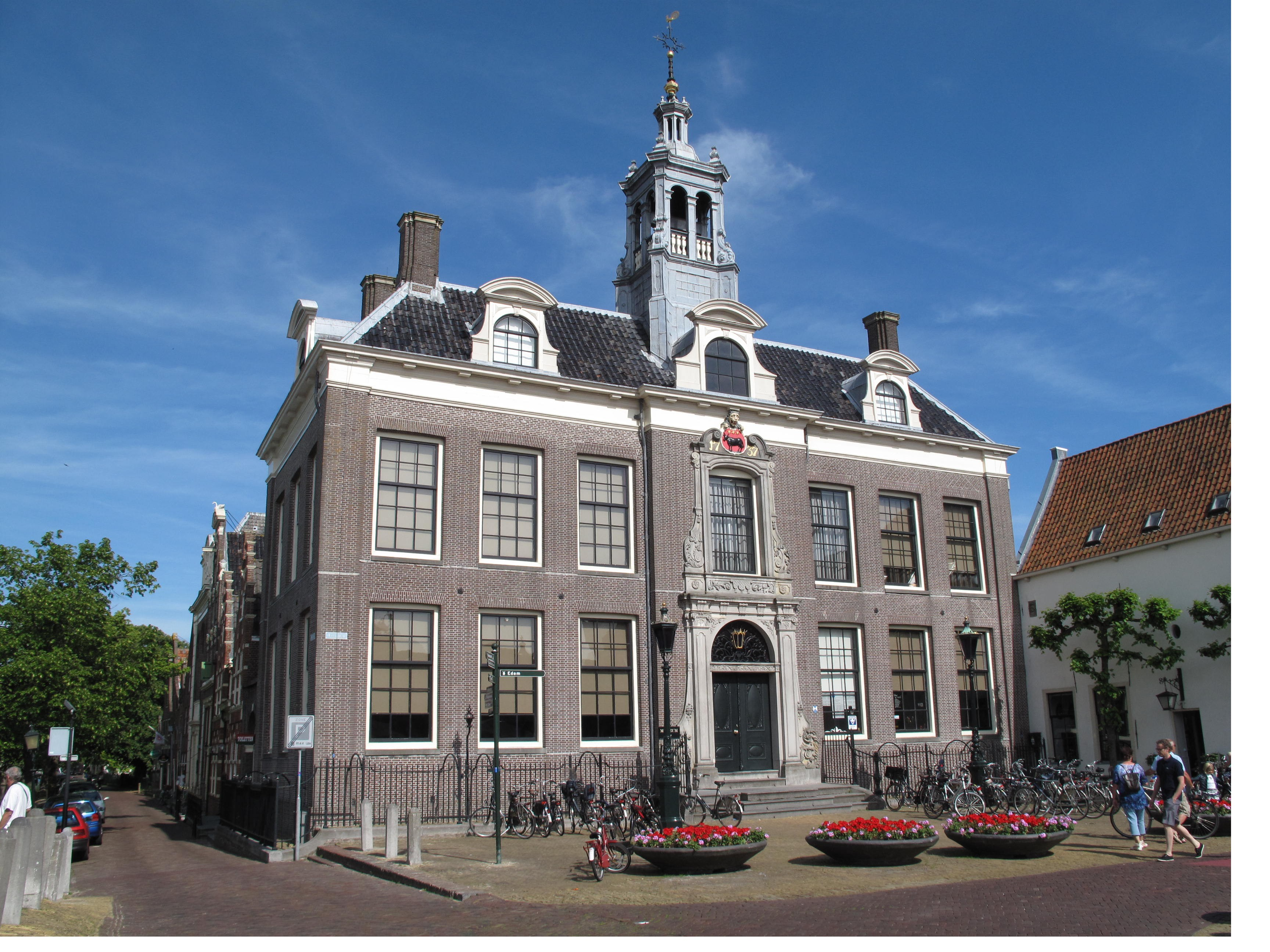
A town square in Edam.

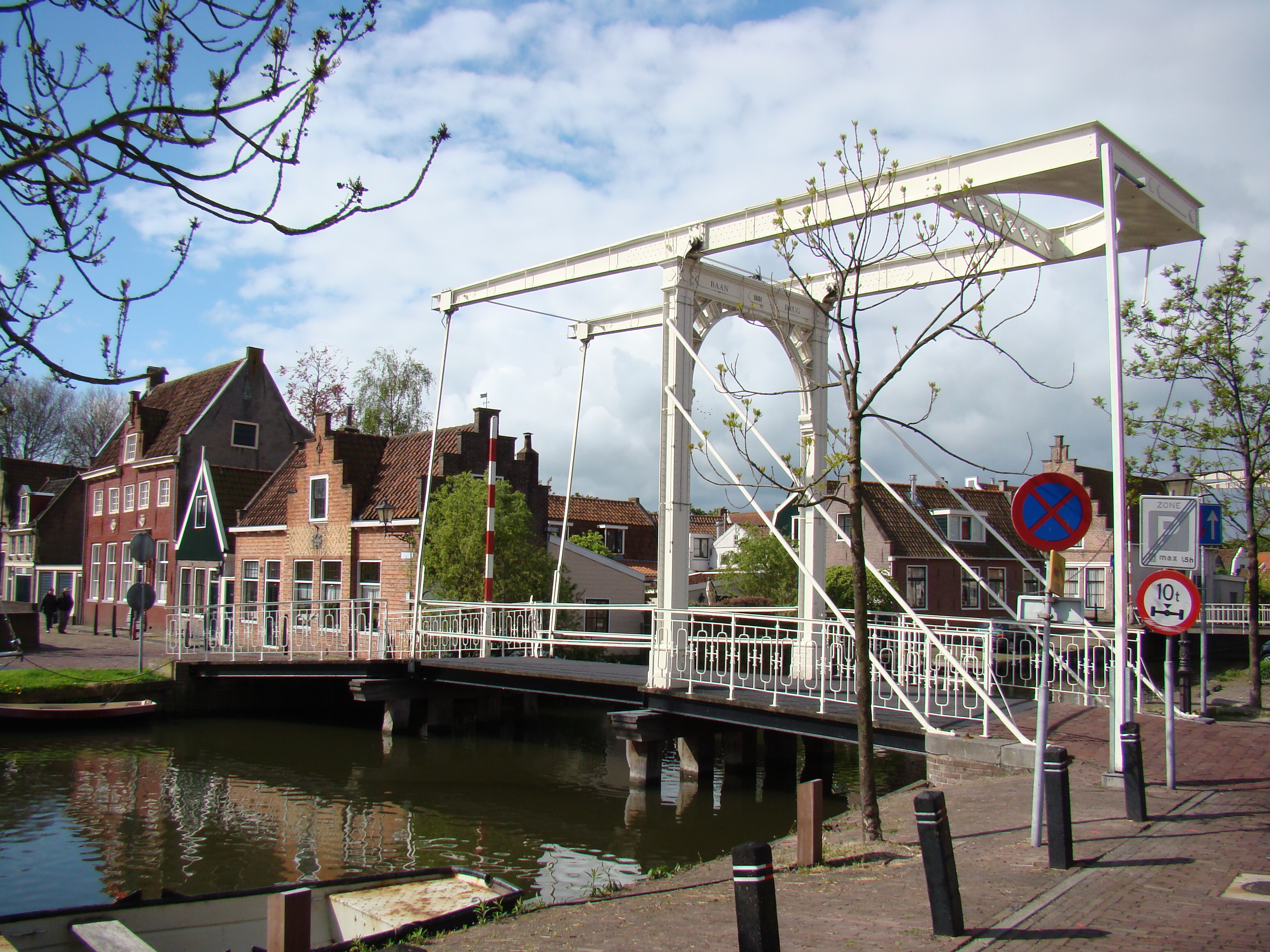
A canal and a drawbridge in Edam.

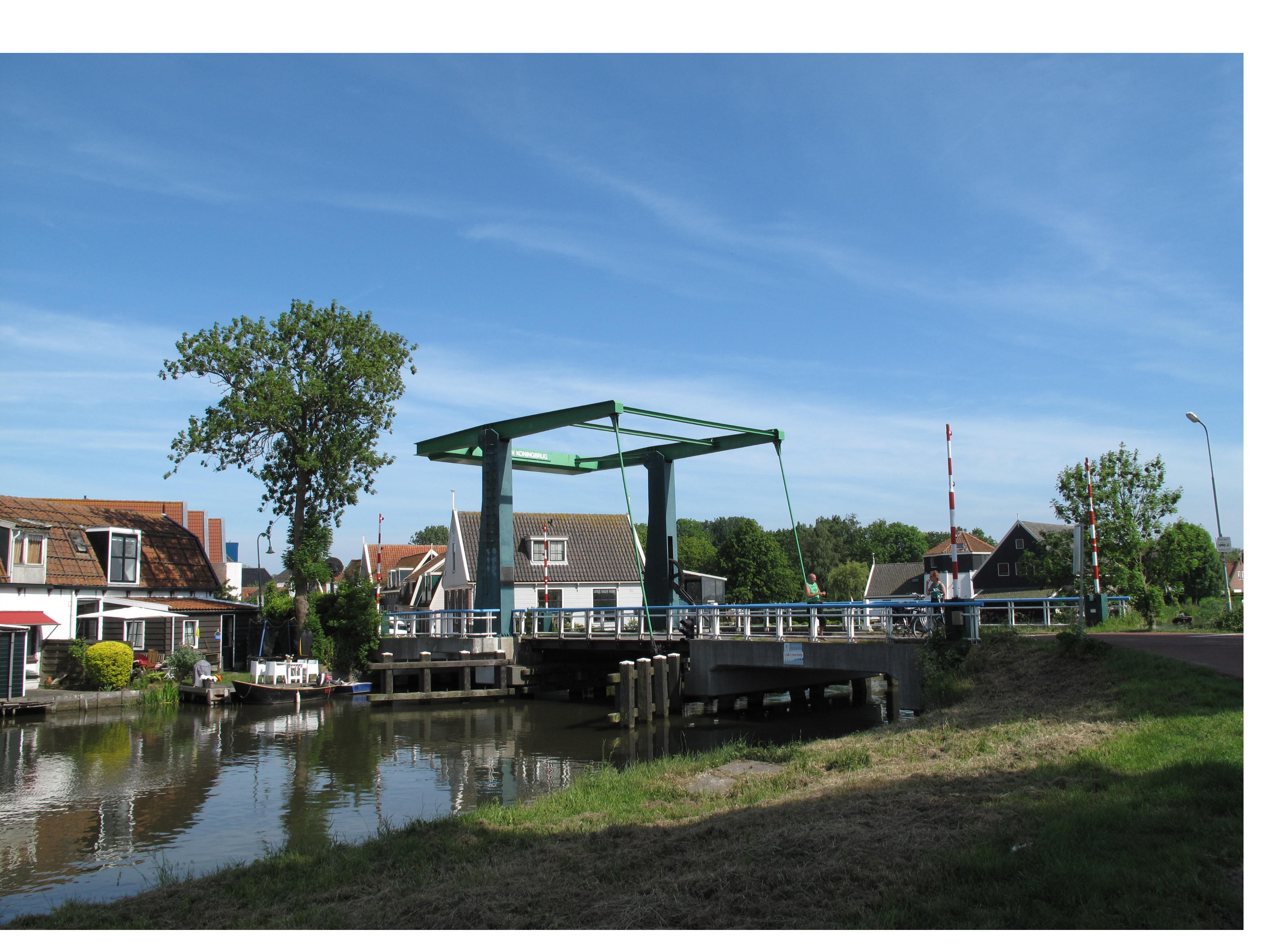
A canal and a drawbridge in Edam.

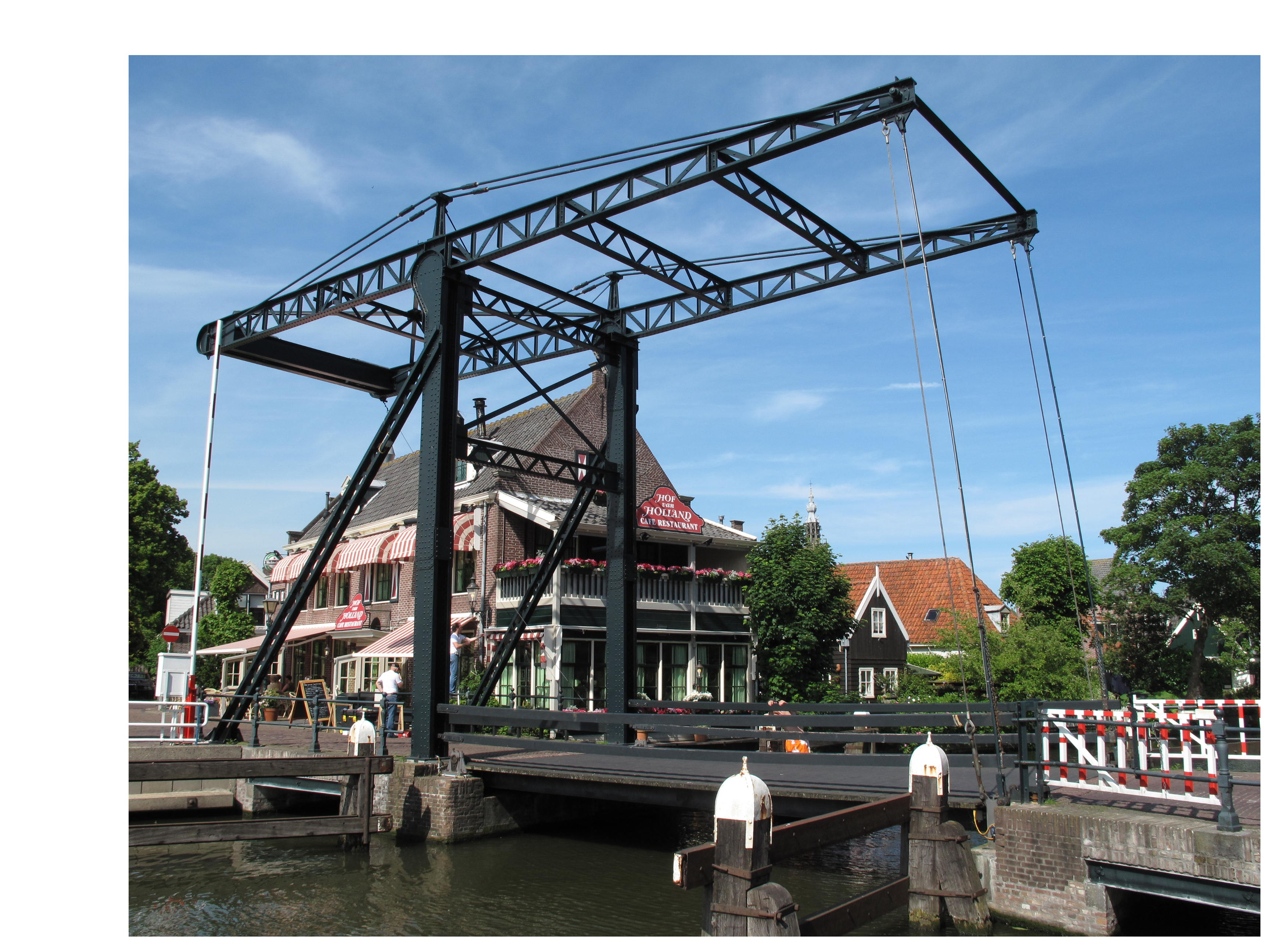
A canal and a drawbridge in Edam.

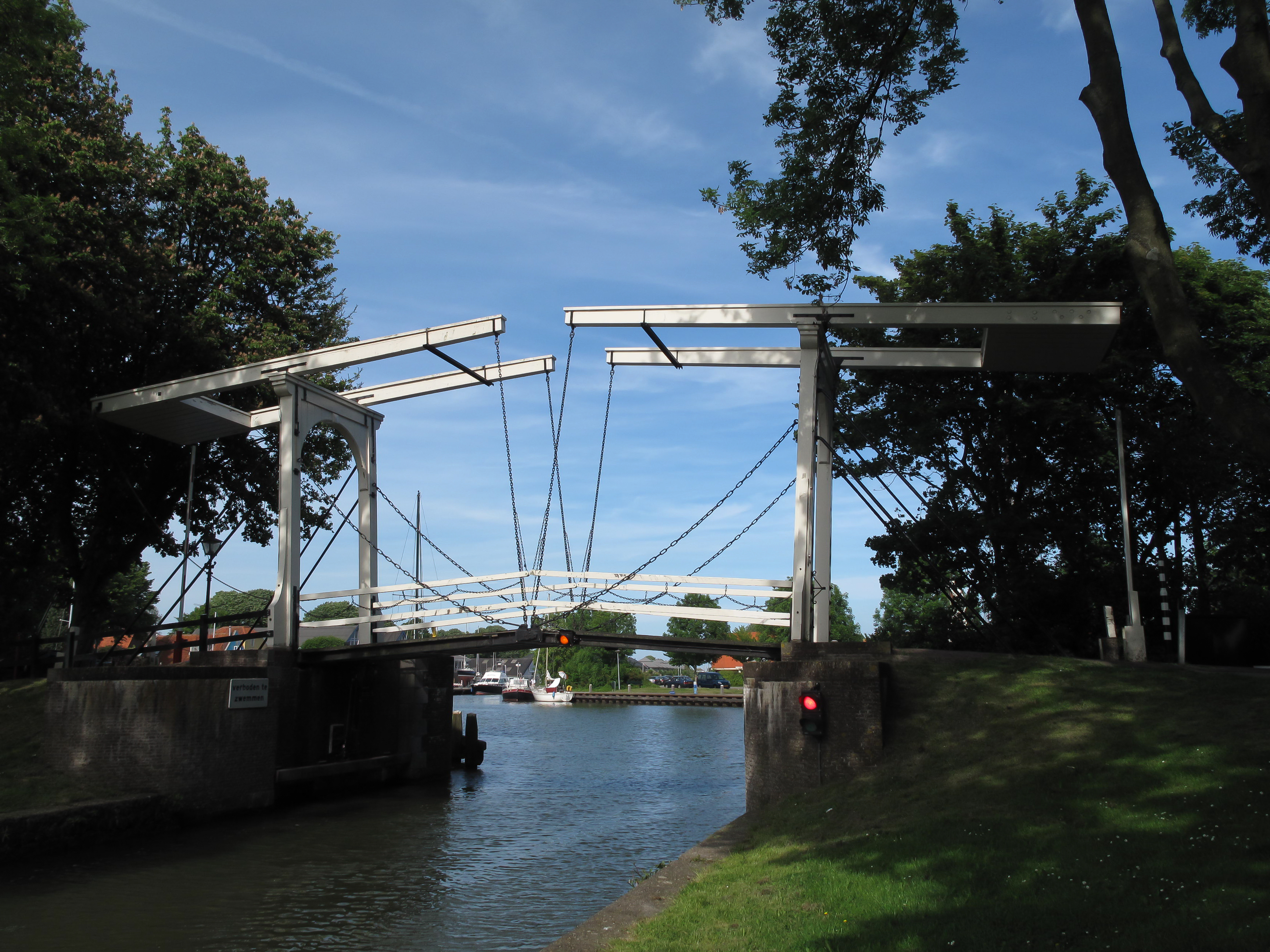
A canal and a drawbridge in Edam.
