= Purmerbuurt =

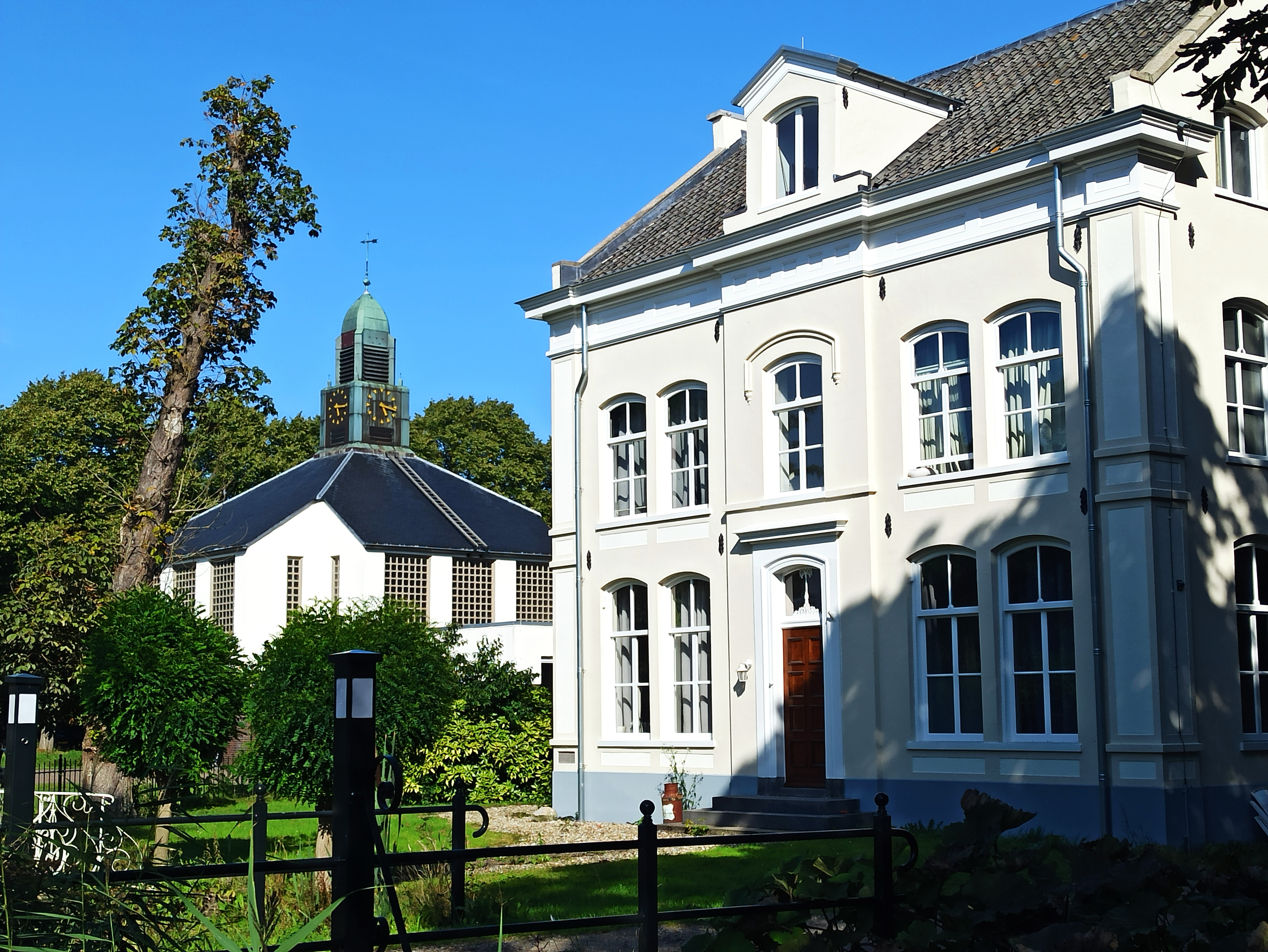

- Flag Coat of arms

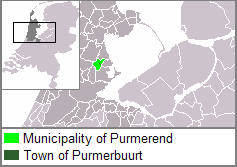
- Location of the Purmerbuurt.
- Coordinates: 52°29′47″N 4°59′06″E
- Country: Netherlands
- Province: North Holland
- Municipality: Purmerend
- Time zone: UTC+1 (CET)
  - Summer (DST): CEST

Purmerbuurt is a village in the Dutch province of North Holland in the polder the Purmer. It is part of the municipality of Purmerend, and is directly connected to the city of Purmerend by an Intersection. The village has its own church, de Purmerkerk. Purmerbuurt is surrounded by the Purmerbos. (Purmer forest)
