= Willem Eggert =

Dutch politician, noble, banker en schepen of Amsterdam (1360–1417)

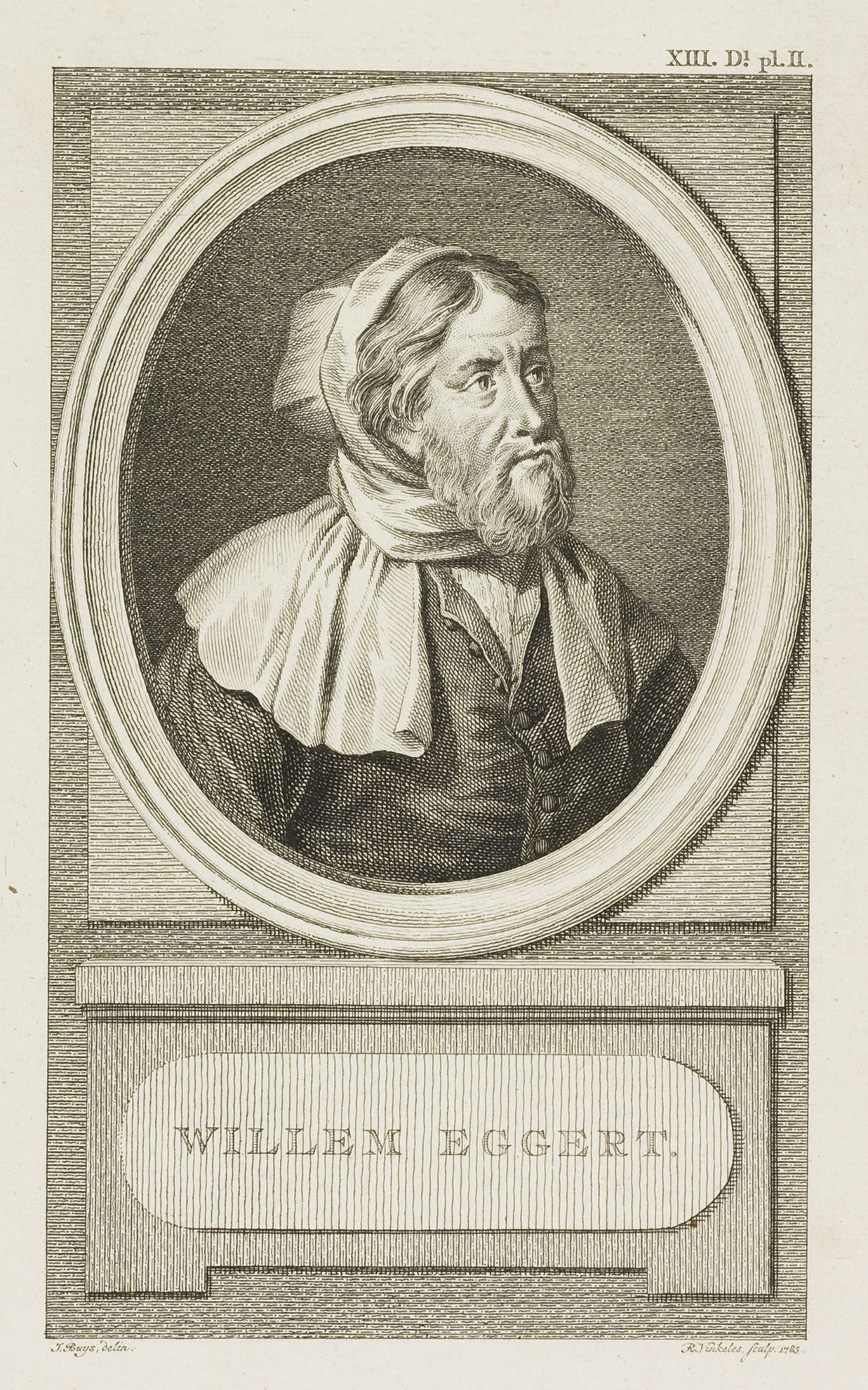
Willem Eggert

Knight Willem Eggert, (Amsterdam, 1360 - Purmerend, 15 July 1417) was a Dutch politician (stadtholder of Holland), noble, banker and schepen of Amsterdam. He owned much land in Weesp, Monnickendam, Oosthuizen, Aalsmeer and Wognum.

== Biography ==
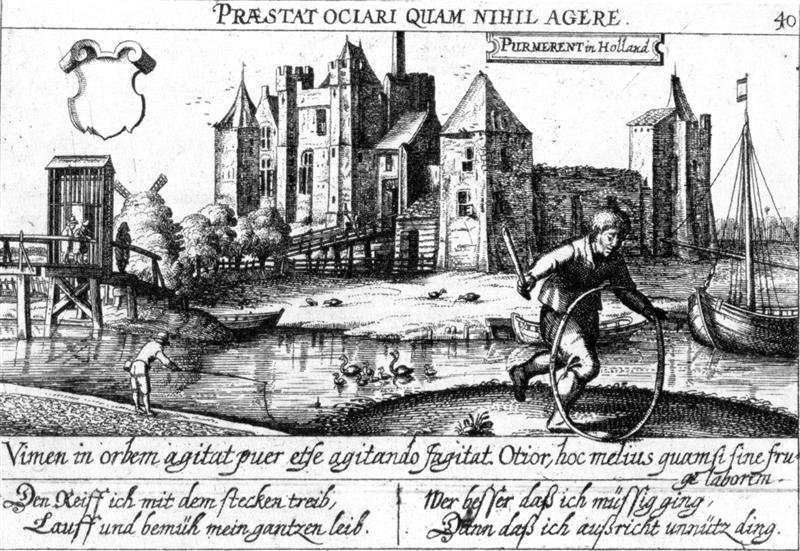
Slot Purmerstein by Claes Jansz. Visscher in 1617

Eggert was the son of the rich landholder Jan Eggert and member of the Eggert family. In 1392 he became advisor to Albert I, Duke of Bavaria, count of Holland. In 1404 he was made treasurer of Amsterdam. Eggert was the financier to the count, one of his main advisers in the financial field, and a powerful member in Holland. In 1410 Eggert was styled 1st Lord of the free and high fief Purmerend and Purmerland. In the same year he was allowed, by count William VI of Holland, to build his own fortified castle, Slot Purmerstein. Constructions on the castle finished in 1413. He played an important role during the reign of William VI, including in the conclusion of a three-year peace with the Frisians in 1414. Between 1416 and 1417 Eggert was named a stadtholder of Holland.

Willem Eggert married to Nelle Heynenzoonsdr Vechter and together they had four children: His son Jan Eggert succeeded his father as Lord of Purmerend and Purmerland. His daughters: Jennette Eggert married Reinout van Brakel originally from Geldern, who was appointed Baljuw of Amstelland, Aleid Eggert married to Gerrit van Zijl from Utrecht, and Lijsbeth Willemsdr (also named Imme) Eggert married Willem de Grebber.

Preceded by new creation	1st Lord of the Free and high Lordship Purmerend and Purmerland; 1410–1417	Succeeded by Jan Eggert
