= Purmerend =

- Municipality
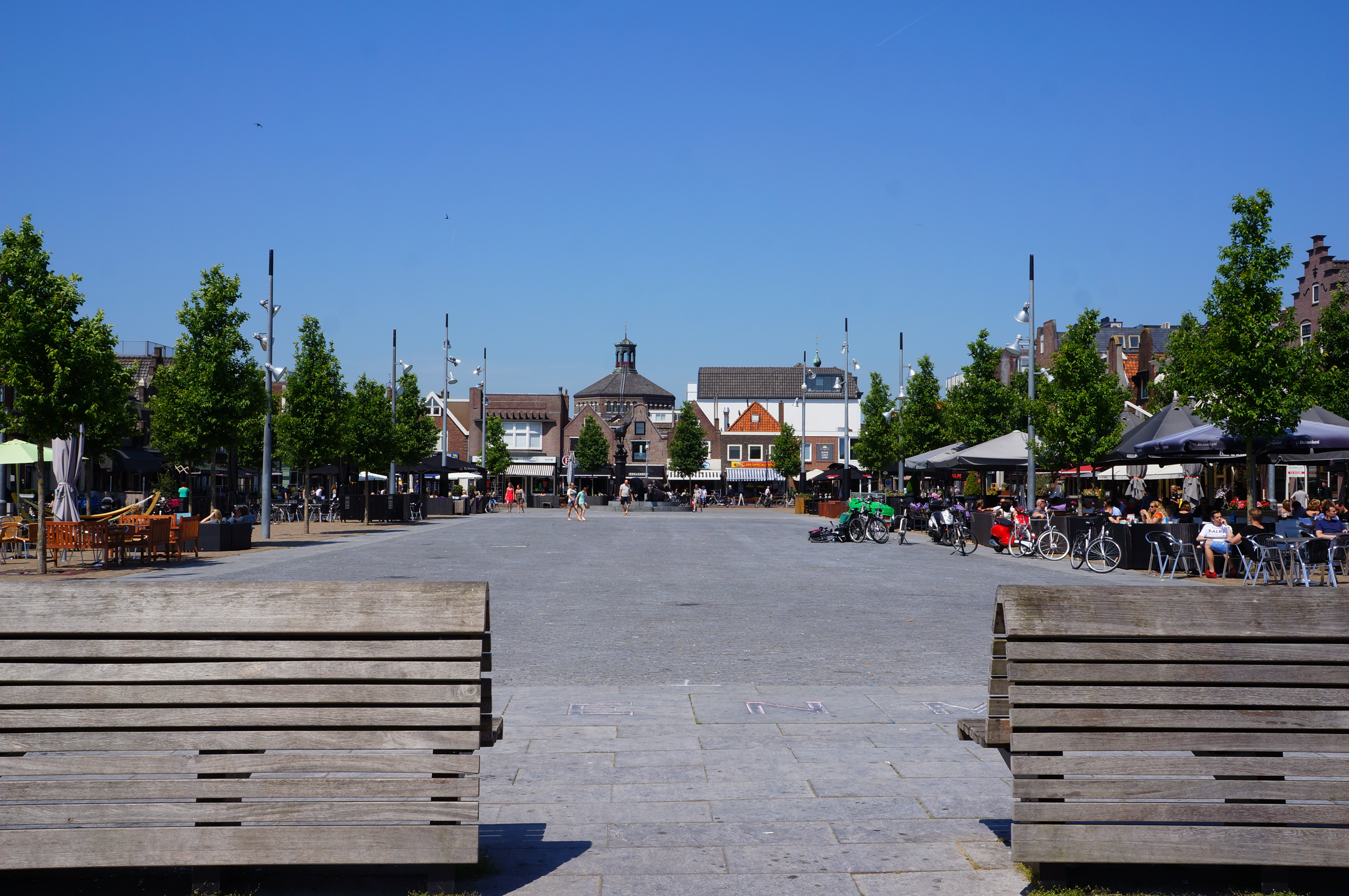
- Purmerend city centre

- Flag Coat of arms

- Location in North Holland
- Coordinates: 52°30′N 4°57′E
- Country: Netherlands
- Province: North Holland
- Region: Amsterdam metropolitan area

Government
  - Body: Municipal council
  - Mayor: Ellen van Selm (D66)

Area
  - Total: 24.56 km^{2} (9.48 sq mi)
  - Land: 23.15 km^{2} (8.94 sq mi)
  - Water: 1.41 km^{2} (0.54 sq mi)
- Elevation: 0 m (0 ft)

Population (January 2021)
  - Total: 81,683
  - Density: 3,528/km^{2} (9,140/sq mi)
- Demonym: Purmerender
- Time zone: UTC+1 (CET)
  - Summer (DST): UTC+2 (CEST)
- Postcode: 1440–1448
- Area code: 0299
- Website: www.purmerend.nl

Purmerend (Dutch pronunciation: [ˌpʏrməˈrɛnt]) is a city and municipality in the west of the Netherlands, in the province of North Holland. The city is surrounded by polders, such as the Purmer, Beemster and the Wormer. Purmerend's population grew relatively slowly until the 1960s, when it increased from around 10,000 to over 80,000 by 2020. This expansion has turned Purmerend into a commuter town; many inhabitants (14,200 in 2011) work, go to school or spend leisure time in Amsterdam. Purmerend is part of the Randstad, one of the largest conurbations in Europe.

The municipality of Beemster merged into the municipality of Purmerend on 1 January 2022. The extended municipality has a population of about 96,000.

== History ==
=== Early history ===
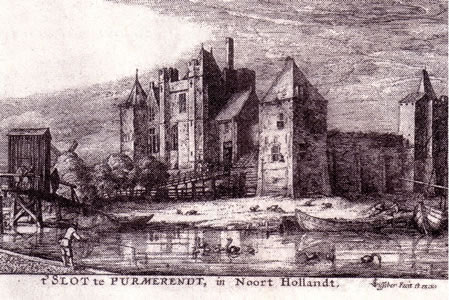
Medieval drawing of the fortified castle Slot Purmersteijn

Purmerend was created out of the small fishing village Purmer, which was situated on the land between the Purmermeer (Purmer Lake), the Beemstermeer (Beemster Lake) and the Wormermeer (Wormer Lake) on the south bank of the river Weere, which used to connect the former Purmermeer and Beemstermeer.

Purmerend was founded by a rich banker and landowner from Amsterdam, Willem Eggert. Count William VI of Holland (Willem VI van Holland) gave him permission to build a fortified castle, Slot Purmerstein, in 1410. The castle was completed in 1413. This led to the foundation of the town of Purmerend. The castle was demolished in 1741, after it had fallen into decline.

In 1434 Purmerend was given city rights and in 1484 "marktrechten", (the right to organise two "jaarmarkten" annual markets and a "weekmarkt" weekly market) by Count Jan van Egmond. This meant merchants from outside of Purmerend could sell in the market. Before 1484 only food for its own population could be sold.

=== 17th century ===
By 1500 Purmerend had grown considerably, as can be seen on maps from this period. The town had a rectangular shape and was crossed by two roads: one leading north–south, the other east–west. The draining of the Beemster Lake in 1612 and the Purmer Lake in 1622 resulted in a great loss in fishing grounds to Purmerend. However, the new and fertile soil favoured agriculture and livestock breeding, making Purmerend prosperous again. Purmerend now became the centre of an agricultural region, the produce of which was sold on the markets of Purmerend.

=== 19th century ===
From 1819 till 1824 the Noordhollandsch Kanaal was constructed. It was dug along existing waterways like the Oude Vaart, which connected Purmerend to the IJ opposite Amsterdam, and along canals that connected Purmerend to Alkmaar. On 20 July 1821 the large Schutsluis Purmerend (Purmerend Lock) was completed just west of the city center.

The Noordhollandsch Kanaal brought increased prosperity to Purmerend. In 1840 the company Brantjes en Comp, trading in wood, was founded. The Firma Dirk Bakker also started to import wood. Meanwhile, Firma Pont from Edam diverted her imports over Purmerend via the Where river. Ships from Norway, Sweden, Russia and America then started to make direct trips to Purmerend to bring wood. Sometimes 12 of these were present at the same time.

The increased commerce and shipping led to the creation of an industry that catered for ships. In turn Purmerend merchants started to equip whalers. In 1866 the establishment of a tow service with 7 tugboats by Gebroeders Goedkoop was one of the last highlights of this period. By about 1880 this boom period for Purmerend was ending, because the new North Sea Canal diverted traffic elsewhere.

=== 20th century ===
During World War II Purmerend was occupied by German forces on 14 May 1940. After five years of occupation, the city was liberated by Canadian and other allied forces on Wednesday 9 May 1945.

=== 21st century ===
Purmerend was named Kermisstad van Nederland (Funfair City of the Netherlands) in 2003. The city is also well known for its cattle market, the so-called koemarkt (“cow market”), where cattle are sold and traded, mostly cows and sheep. (52.50823°N 4.94985°E) After the outbreak of many cattle diseases between 1995 and 2001 the cattle market was closed, but reinstated on a smaller scale in January 2002.

After 400 years in a location in central Purmerender, in 2008 the cattle market was moved to the "Baanstee Oost" industrial area, on the north side of Purmerend. This was done for various reasons, including reduced traffic congestion and more parking space in the city centre, as well as more room for auction grounds and ease of moving trucks at the new site.

== Geography and climate ==
=== Geography ===
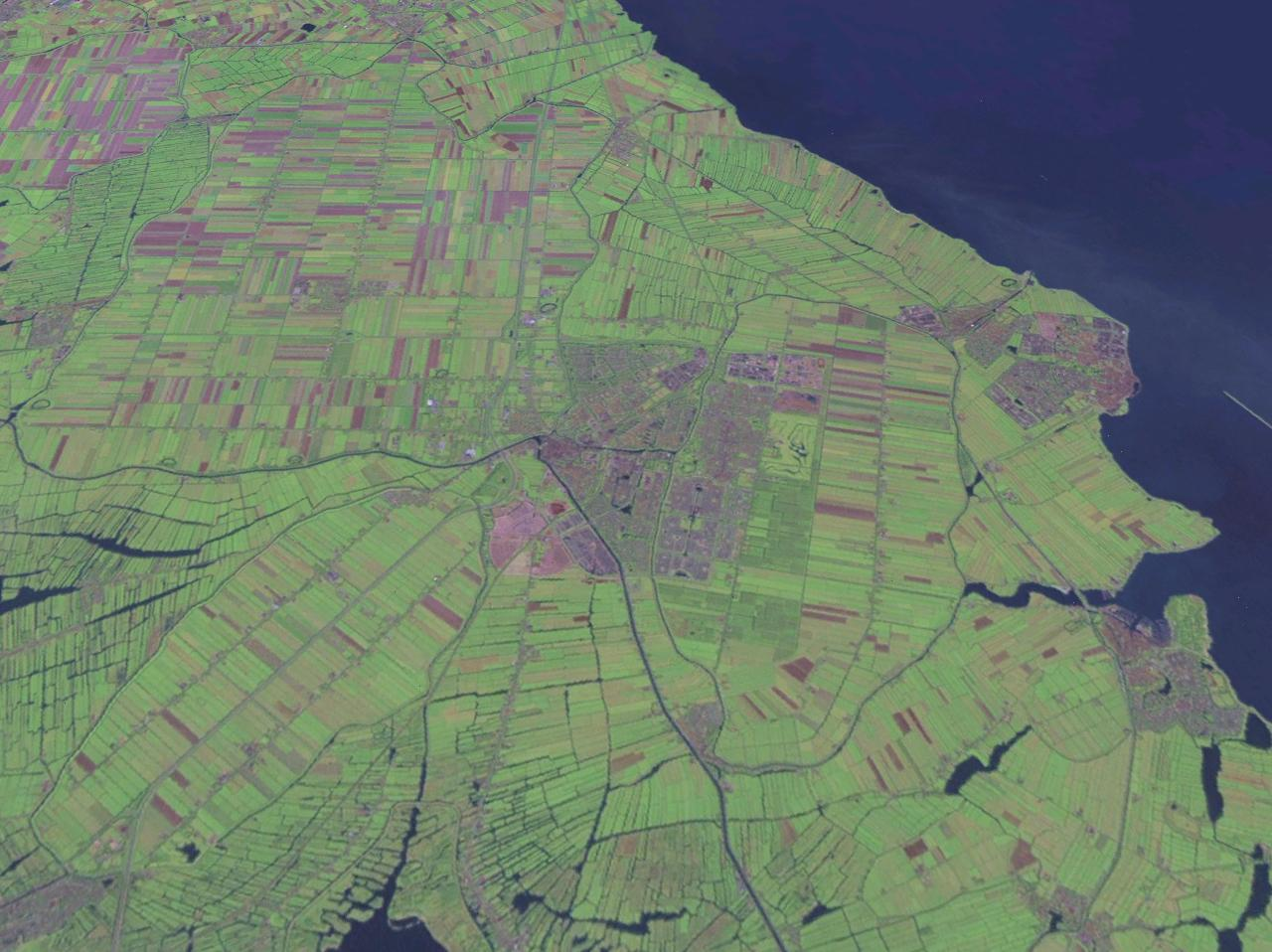
Satellite photo of the city of Purmerend. (centered)

Purmerend lies on a swampy and watery area known as Waterland. When the first settlers began cultivating the land, it consisted mostly of turf (veen), they dug ditches that run parallel to each other to drain excess water. As a side effect of this process, the land began to sink. This resulted in a never-ending battle against the water, and made agriculture near impossible at the time. It also meant that any structure needed to be built on an artificial Terp or natural hill. This applied to Purmerend which was built on the bank of the river De Where, that linked the former Beemster and Purmer lakes.

=== Topography ===
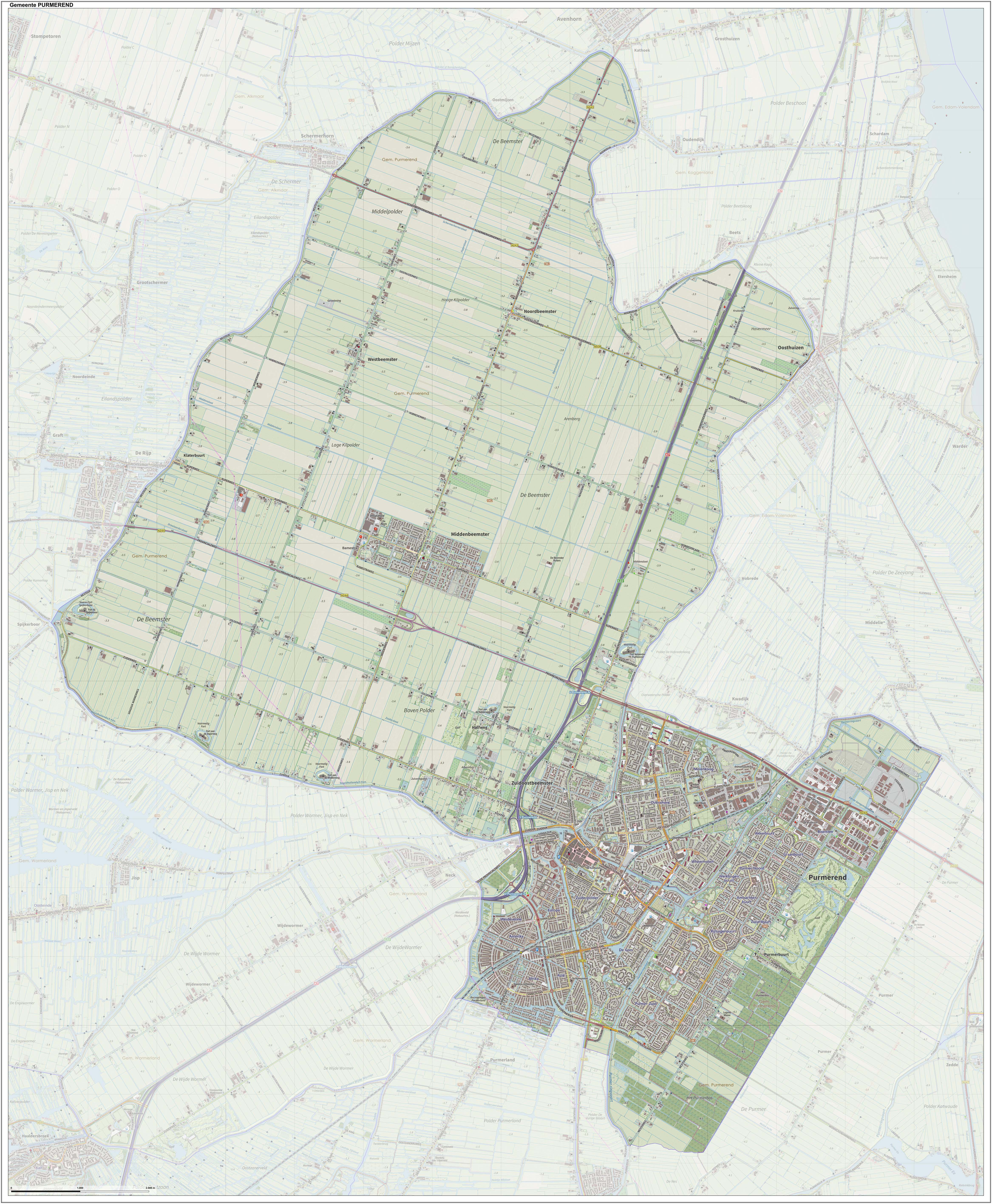
Map of Purmerend (municipality), as of 2022

=== Districts ===
Purmerend is made up of the following districts.

- Centrum
- Zuiderpolder
- Overwhere-Noord
- Overwhere-Zuid
- De Gors
- De Gors-Zuid
- De Gors-Noord
- West
- Purmer-Zuid
- Purmer-Noord
- Wheermolen
- Weidevenne
- Baanstee-West
- Baanstee-Oost
- Baanstee-Noord
- De Koog
- Molenkoog
- Hazepolder
- Kop van Noord

The municipality of Purmerend also contains the towns/hamlets of Purmerbuurt and partially the Purmer. (The Purmer is shared with Edam-Volendam and Waterland)

=== Climate ===
Climate data for Purmerend
Month	Jan	Feb	Mar	Apr	May	Jun	Jul	Aug	Sep	Oct	Nov	Dec	Year
Mean daily maximum °C (°F)	5.4 (41.7)	6.0 (42.8)	9.2 (48.6)	12.4 (54.3)	17.1 (62.8)	19.2 (66.6)	21.4 (70.5)	21.8 (71.2)	18.4 (65.1)	14.1 (57.4)	9.2 (48.6)	6.5 (43.7)	13.4 (56.1)
Mean daily minimum °C (°F)	0.5 (32.9)	0.2 (32.4)	2.4 (36.3)	4.0 (39.2)	7.8 (46.0)	10.4 (50.7)	12.5 (54.5)	12.3 (54.1)	10.2 (50.4)	7.0 (44.6)	3.9 (39.0)	1.9 (35.4)	6.1 (43.0)
Source: KNMI

== Public transport ==
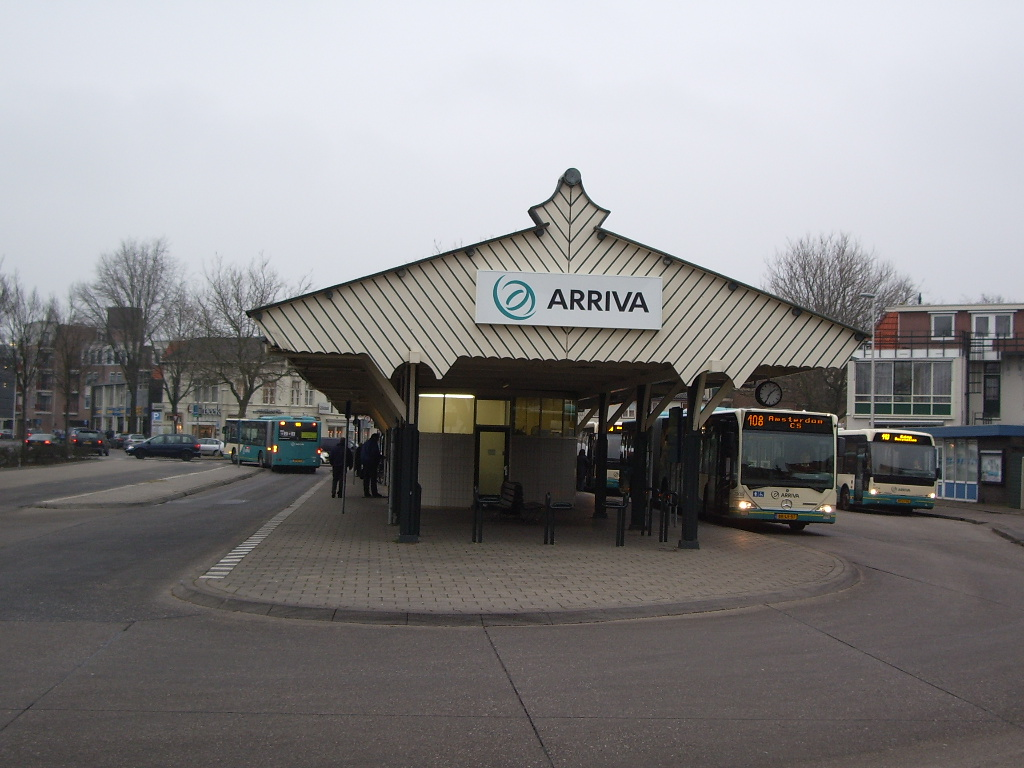
Tramplein.

Public transportation is mainly focused on Amsterdam, with several bus services and a train service via Zaandam.

There are 3 train stations in Purmerend, in the north, centre and south. These are:

- Purmerend Overwhere (North)
- Purmerend (Centre)
- Purmerend Weidevenne (South)

The bus station in Purmerend is called "Tramplein" (or, Tram Square). Historically, a tram ("'t Boemeltje") ran from Amsterdam Centraal to Purmerend, ending at the Tramplein. The end stop retained the name even after the tram service was discontinued.

In 1951 The Ramblers had a hit commemorating the tram service "’t Boemeltje van Purmerend".

In 2019, the province of North Holland revealed plans to extend the Amsterdam Metro's Noord-Zuidlijn from Noord station to Purmerend.

== Local government ==
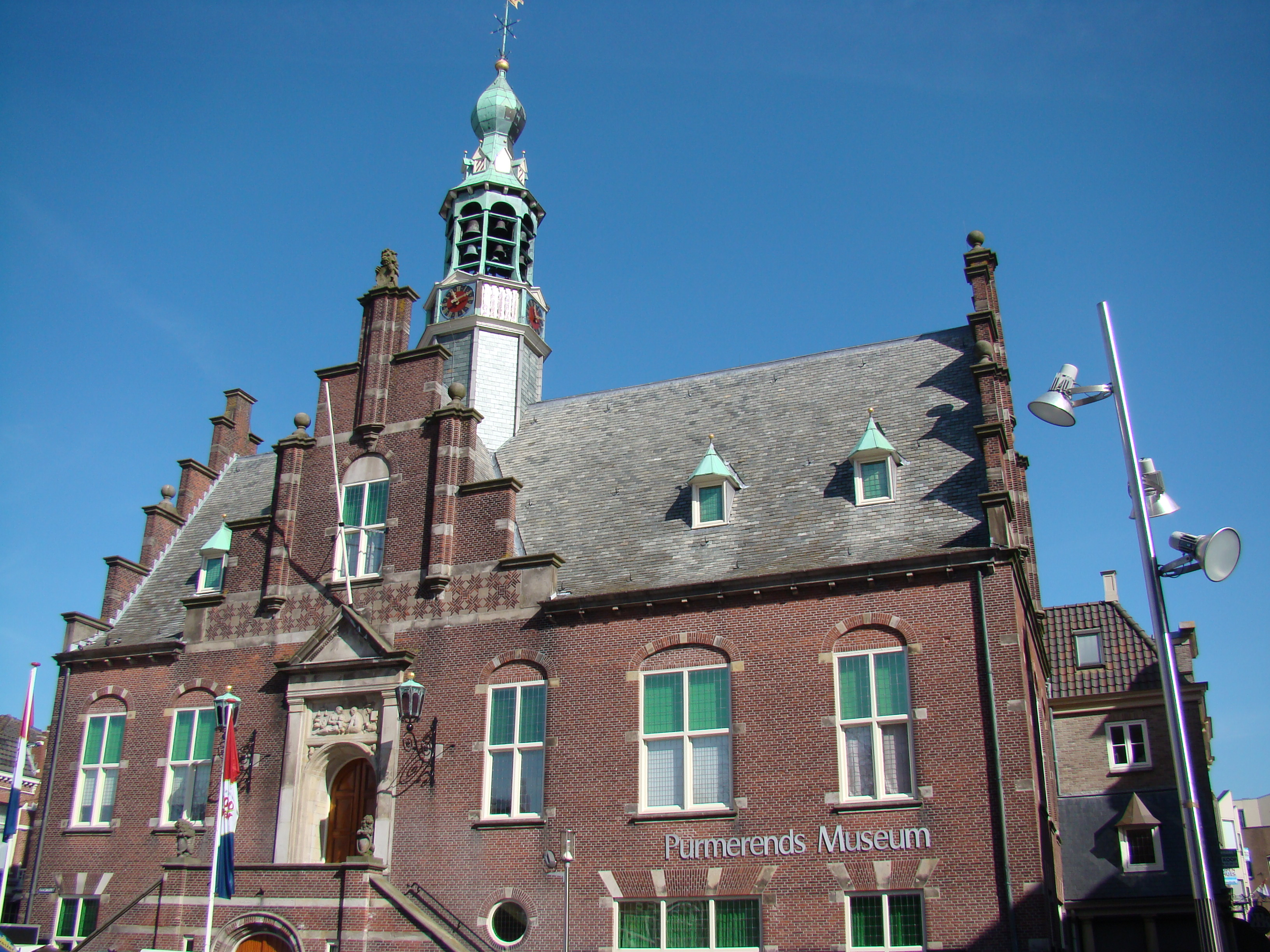
Former city hall. Now a museum.

The municipal council of Purmerend consists of 37 seats, which divided as follows in the elections of November 2021:

Seats
Party	2021	2026
Stadspartij - Beemster Polder Partij	9	7
GroenLinks–PvdA	-	6
FvD	2	5
VVD	4	3
Ouderenpartij AOV Purmerend	3	3
D66	3	3
Partij voor Purmerend	-	3
CDA	2	2
Gemeentebelangen Purmerend	1	2
PB21	1	2
Lijst Melvin Smid	-	1
PvdA	5	-
GroenLinks	3	-
PVV	2	-
Leefbaar Purmerend	1	-
Total	37	37

These were the first elections for the new enlarged municipality that included Beemster. It commenced work on 1 January 2012.

Since 22 September 2022 the mayor of Purmerend has been Ellen van Selm.

== Born in Purmerend ==
Notable people born in Purmerend:

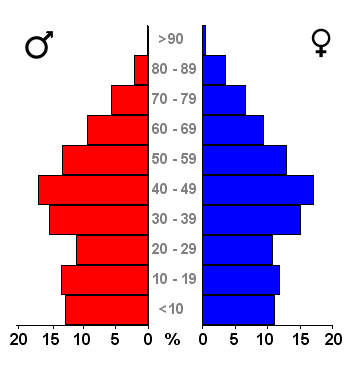
Population pyramid of Purmerend.

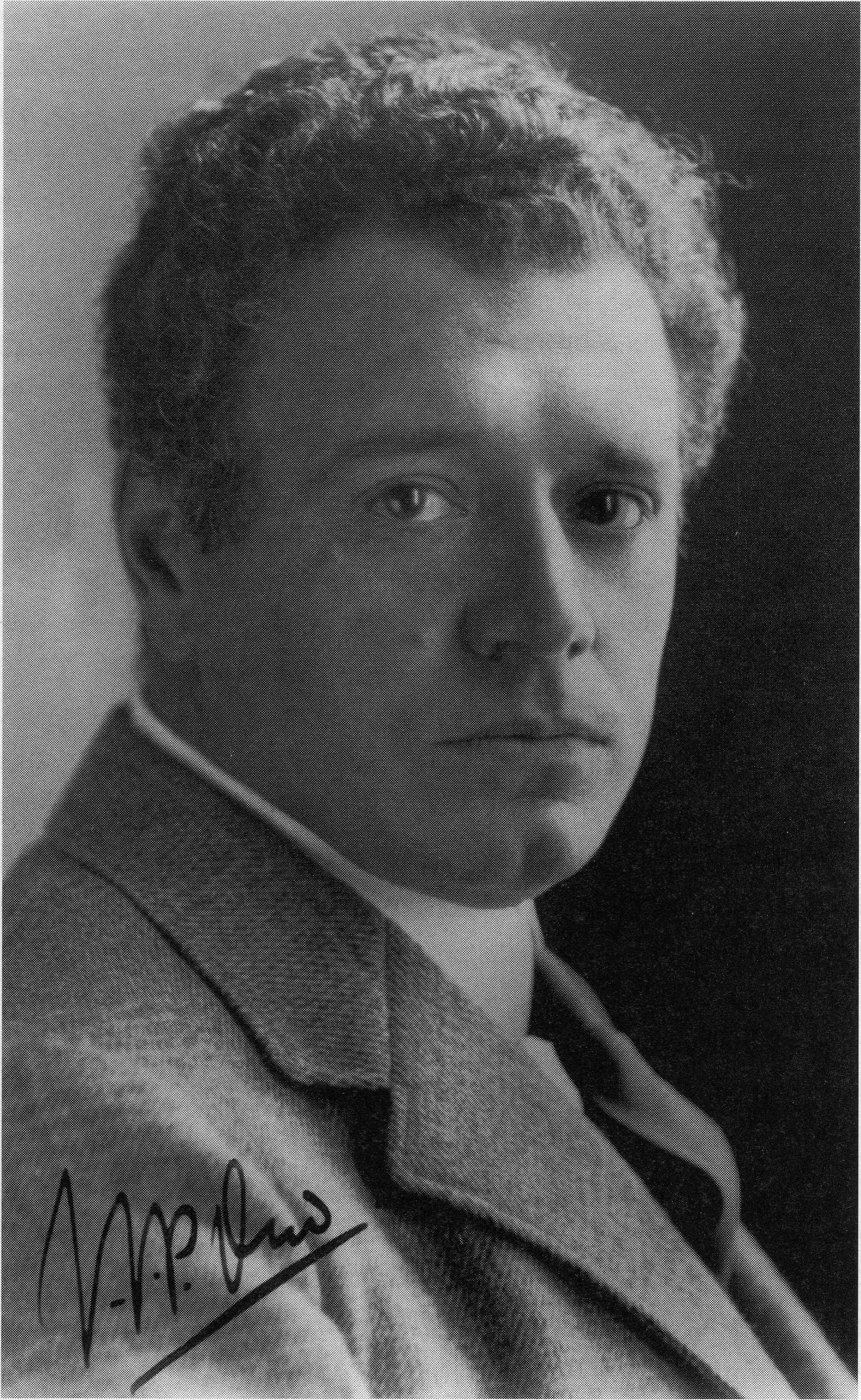
J.J.P. Oud, 1918

- Jan Stuyt (1868–1934), a Dutch architect
- Pieter Oud (1886–1968), a Dutch politician, Minister of finance and Mayor of Rotterdam
- Jacobus Oud (1890–1963), a Dutch architect, follower of the De Stijl movement
- Mart Stam (1899–1986), architect, urban planner and chair designer
- Hendrik de Wit (1909–1999), a Dutch systematic botanist
- Leen Verbeek (born 1954), a Dutch politician, Mayor of Purmerend from 2003 to 2008
- Jan van Zanen (born 1961), a Dutch politician, Mayor of Utrecht from 2014 to 2020
- Hans Klok (born 1969), a Dutch magician, illusionist and actor
- Duncan Stutterheim (born 1971), a Dutch entrepreneur, founded of the event company ID&T
- Kim van Kooten (born 1974), a Dutch actress and screenwriter
- Fleur Agema (born 1976), a Dutch politician and former spatial designer
- Janey Jacké (born 1992), a Dutch drag performer who competed in Drag Race Holland (season 1) and RuPaul's Drag Race: UK vs the World.

=== Sport ===
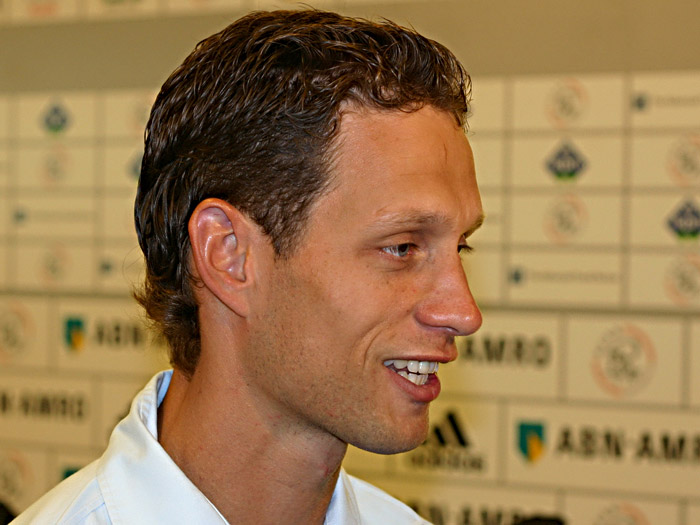
Olaf Lindeberg, 2006

- Martin Koeman (1938–2013), a Dutch footballer, a defender, with over 550 club caps
- Kees Nierop (born 1958), a former Dutch racing driver
- Edwin Zoetebier (born 1970), a former football goalkeeper with 358 club caps
- Olaf Lindenbergh (born 1974), a former Dutch footballer with over 450 club caps
- Vincent van der Voort (born 1975), a Dutch professional darts player
- Yuri Rose (born 1979), a Dutch former midfielder with over 400 club caps, currently a manager
- Kees Kwakman (born 1983), a Dutch former professional footballer with over 400 club caps
- Johan Plat (born 1987), a Dutch former footballer with 138 club caps
- Mitchell Dijks (born 1993), football player, about 150 club caps
- Chico Kwasi (born 1998), kickboxer
- Jay Gorter (born 2000), a Dutch goalkeeper for Ajax born in Purmerend
- Rome-Jayden Owusu-Oduro (born 2004), a Dutch-Ghanaian football goalkeeper

== Twin towns – sister cities ==
Until 2017, Purmerend was twinned with:

- Jihlava, Vysočina Region, Czech Republic

== Gallery ==
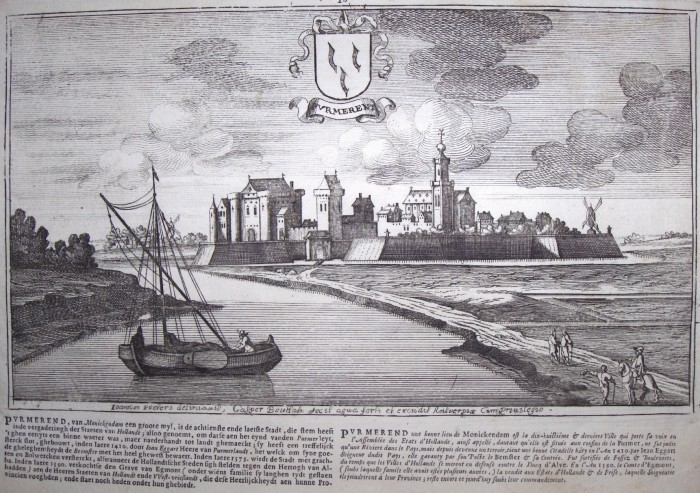
Drawing of the Purmerend skyline from 1674

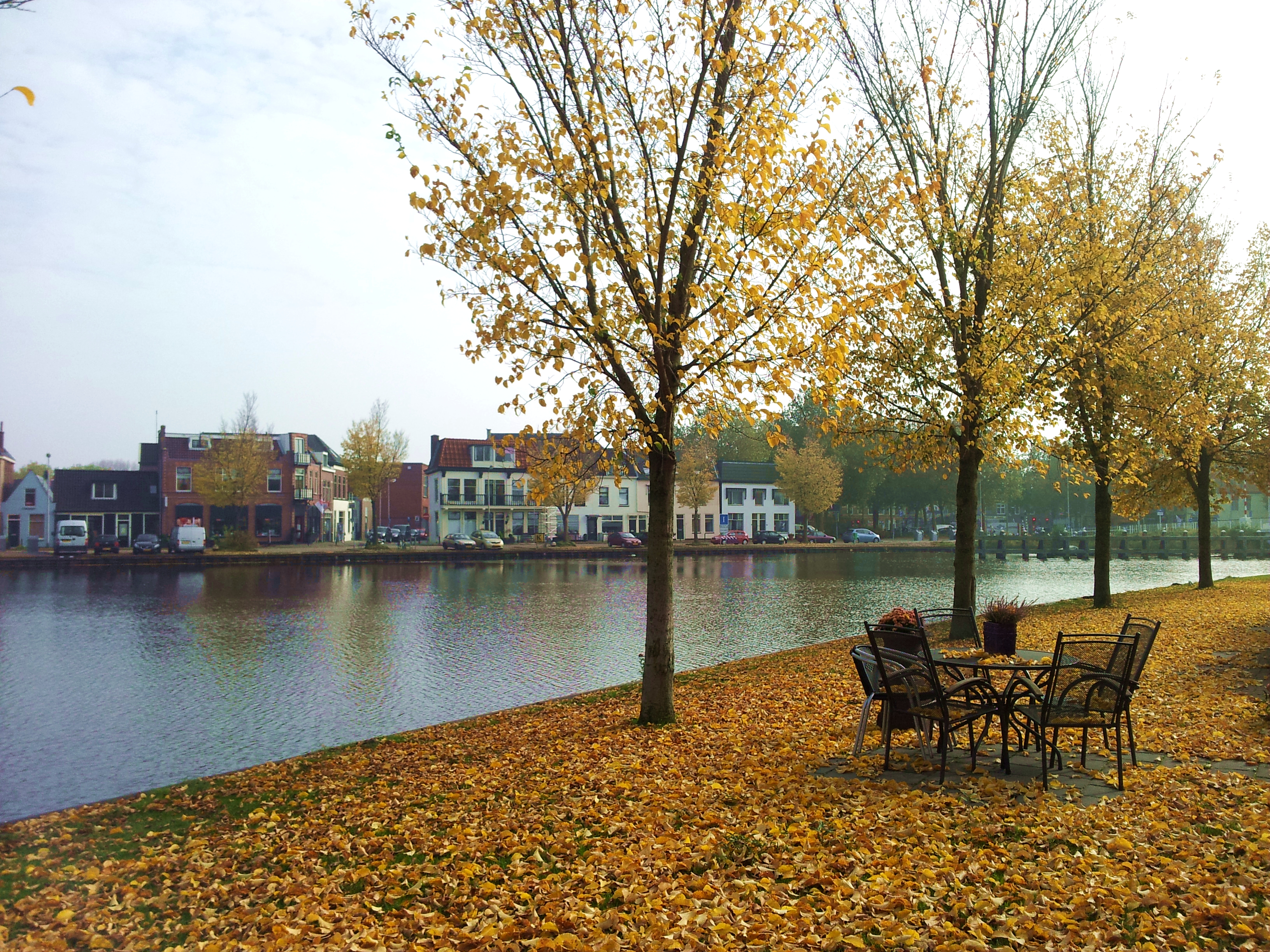
Autumn in Purmerend (2013)

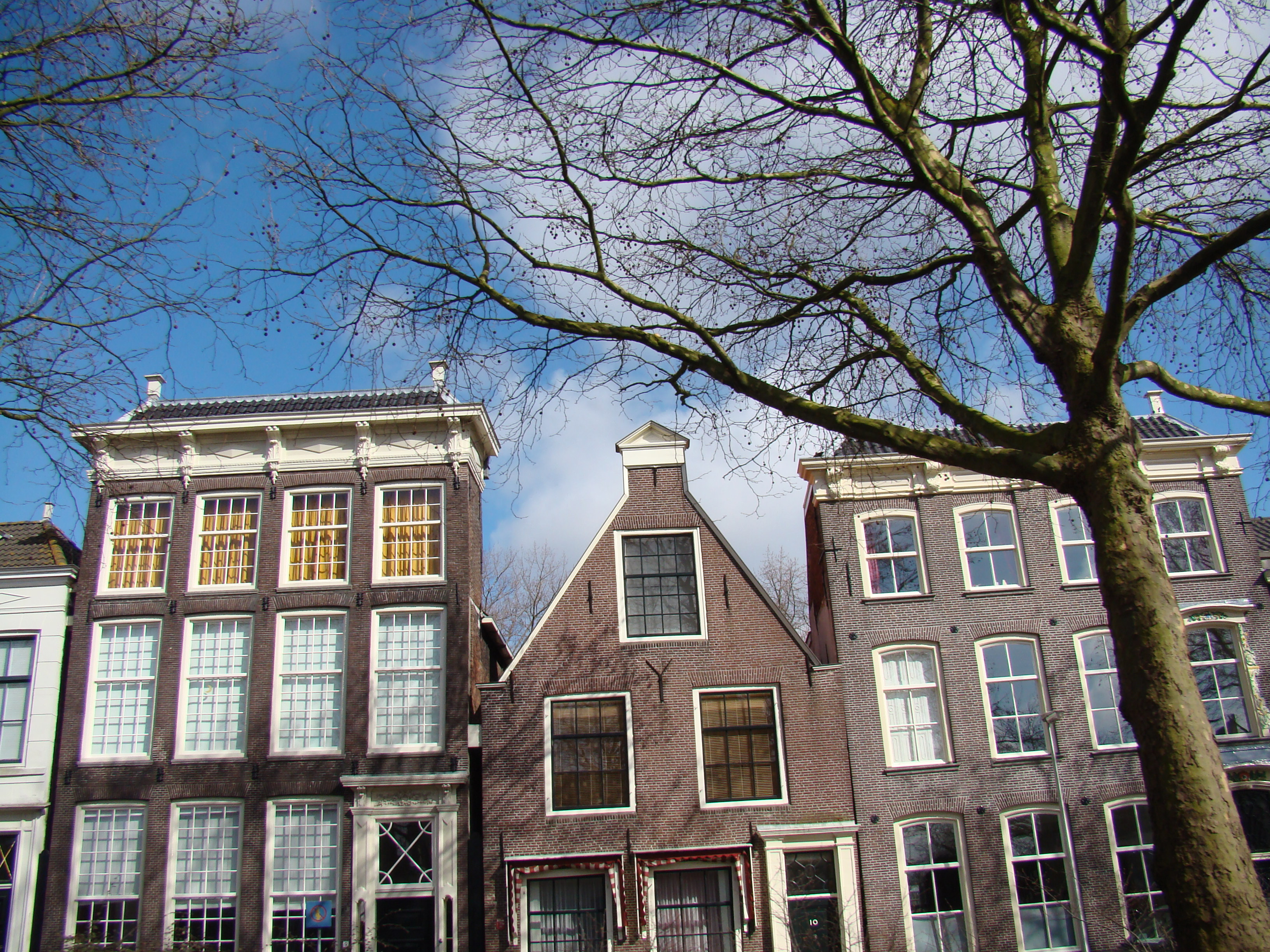
Bierkade in Purmerend
