= Purmerend Overwhere railway station =

Railway station in the Netherlands

Purmerend Overwhere
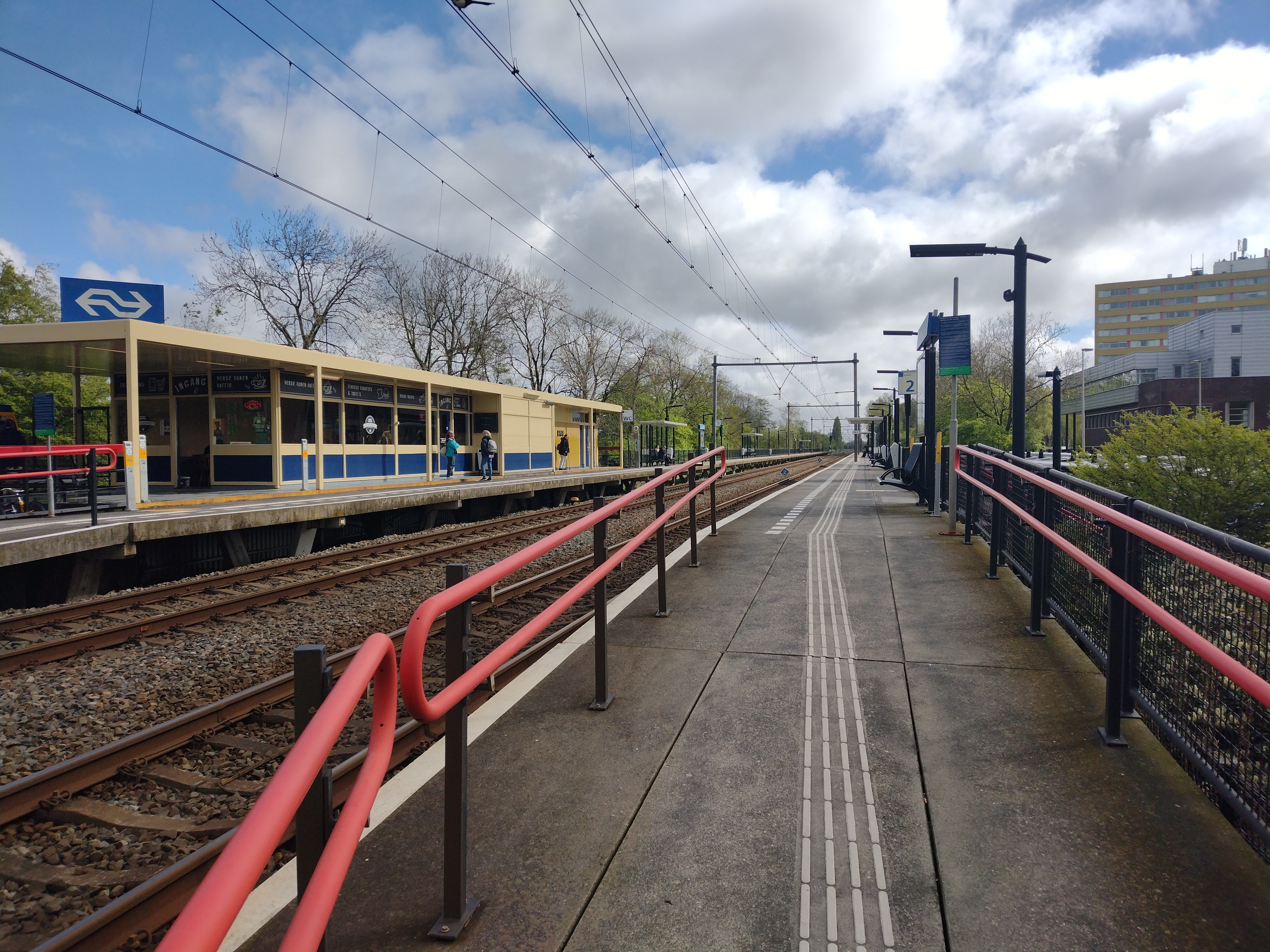
- Purmerend Overwhere in 2024

General information
- Location: Netherlands
- Coordinates: 52°30′41″N 4°58′0″E
- Line: Zaandam–Enkhuizen railway
- Platforms: 2
- Tracks: 2

History
- Opened: September 1971

Services
Preceding station	Nederlandse Spoorwegen	Following station
Purmerend towards Hoofddorp	NS Sprinter 4100	Hoorn towards Hoorn Kersenboogerd
Location
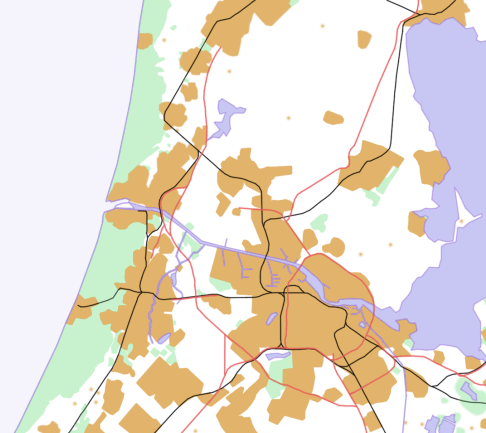
- Location within Northern Randstad Location within Netherlands

Purmerend Overwhere is a suburb railway station in Purmerend, Netherlands. The station opened in 1971, and lies 2 km north of Purmerend. The station is on the Zaandam–Enkhuizen railway.

== Train services ==
The following train services call at Purmerend Overwhere:

- 2x per hour local service (sprinter) Hoofddorp - Schiphol - Zaandam - Hoorn Kersenboogerd

From December 2008, the direct connection with Amsterdam Centraal was lost, due to the Stoptrain 4500 becoming an Intercity, not stopping between Amsterdam Sloterdijk and Hoorn. Therefore, it is recommended to travel to Zaandam/Amsterdam Sloterdijk and change for central Amsterdam.

== Bus services ==
The bus station adjacent to the station services 2 lines.

Bus company	Bus Service	Route
R-Net	306	Station Noord - Ilpendam - Jan Blankenbrug - Station Overwhere - M.L.Kingweg
MeerPlus	413	Beets - Oosthuizen - Durkweg, Kwadijk - Station Overwhere - Tramplein, Purmerend

== Gallery ==
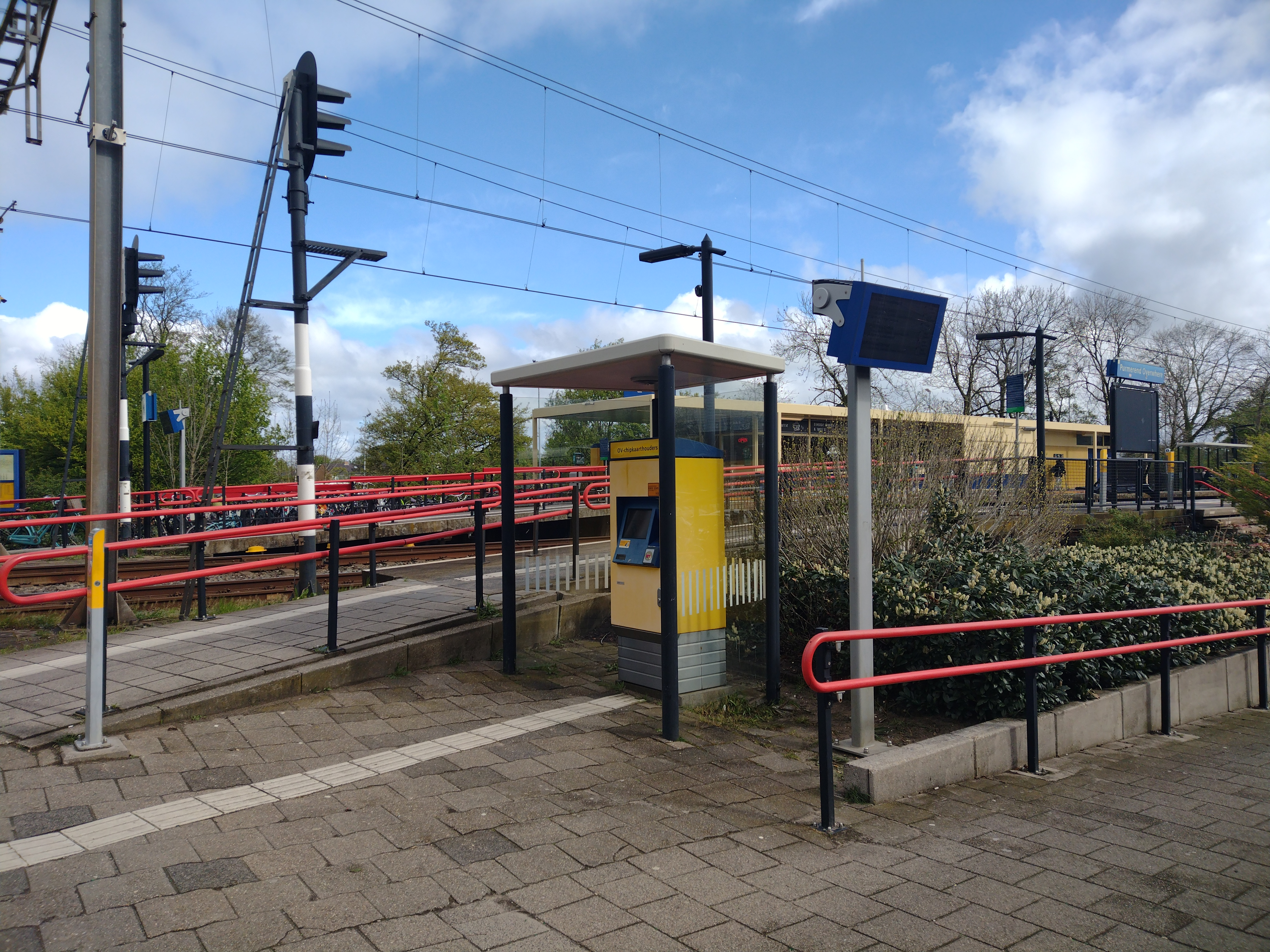
Ticket machine at the train station

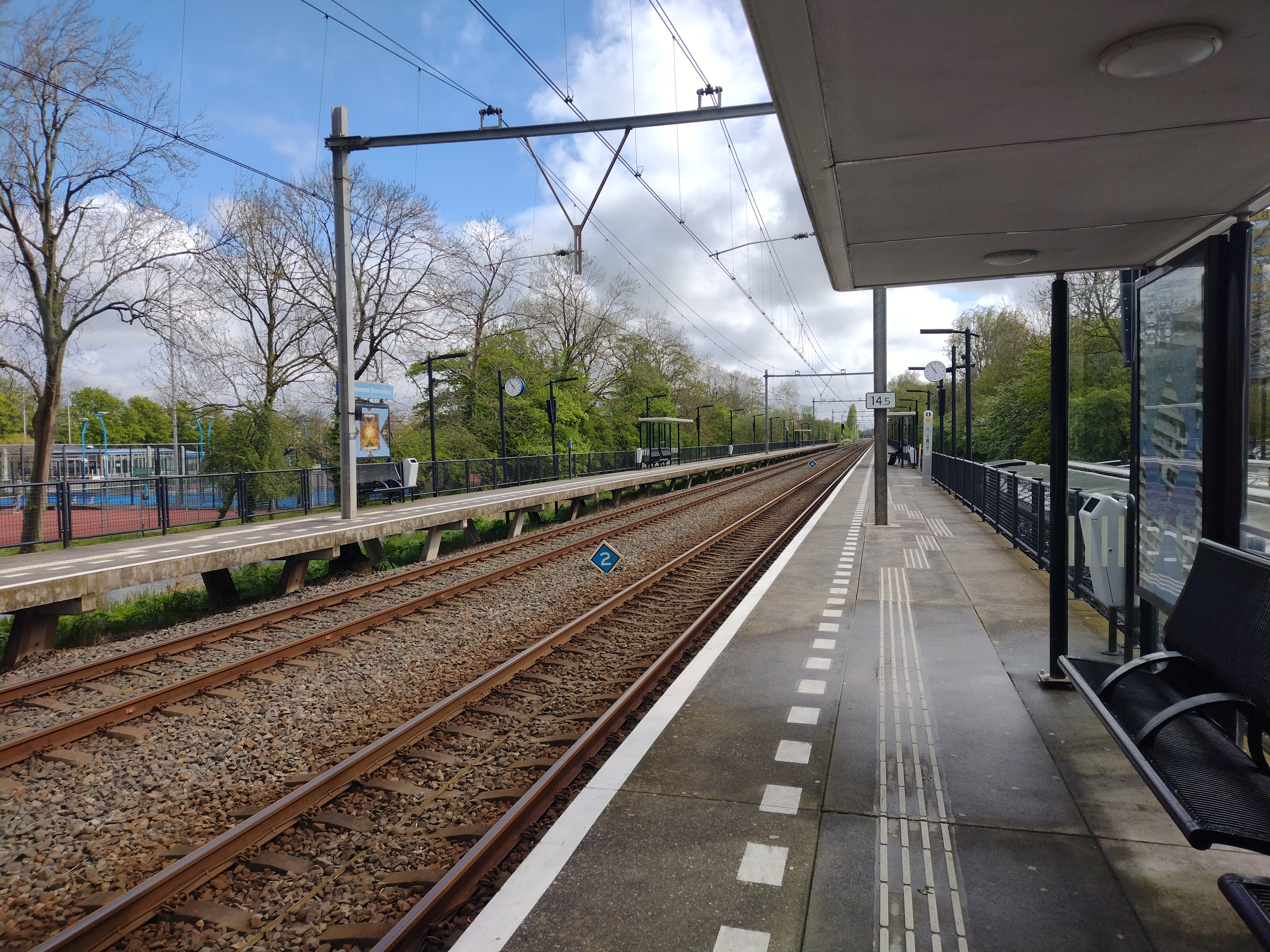
Tracks servicing the train station

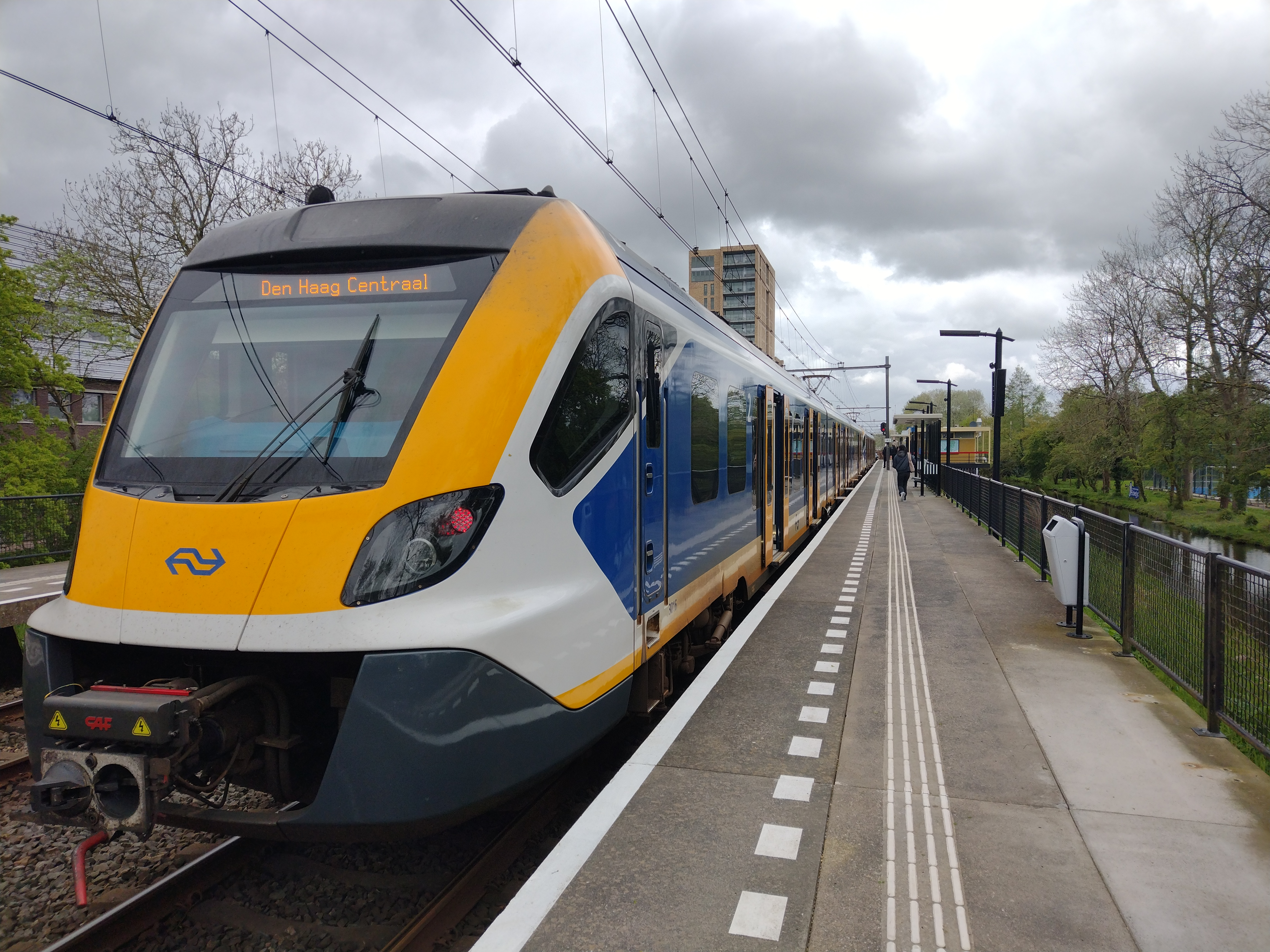
A stopped NS Sprinter bound for Den Haag Centraal

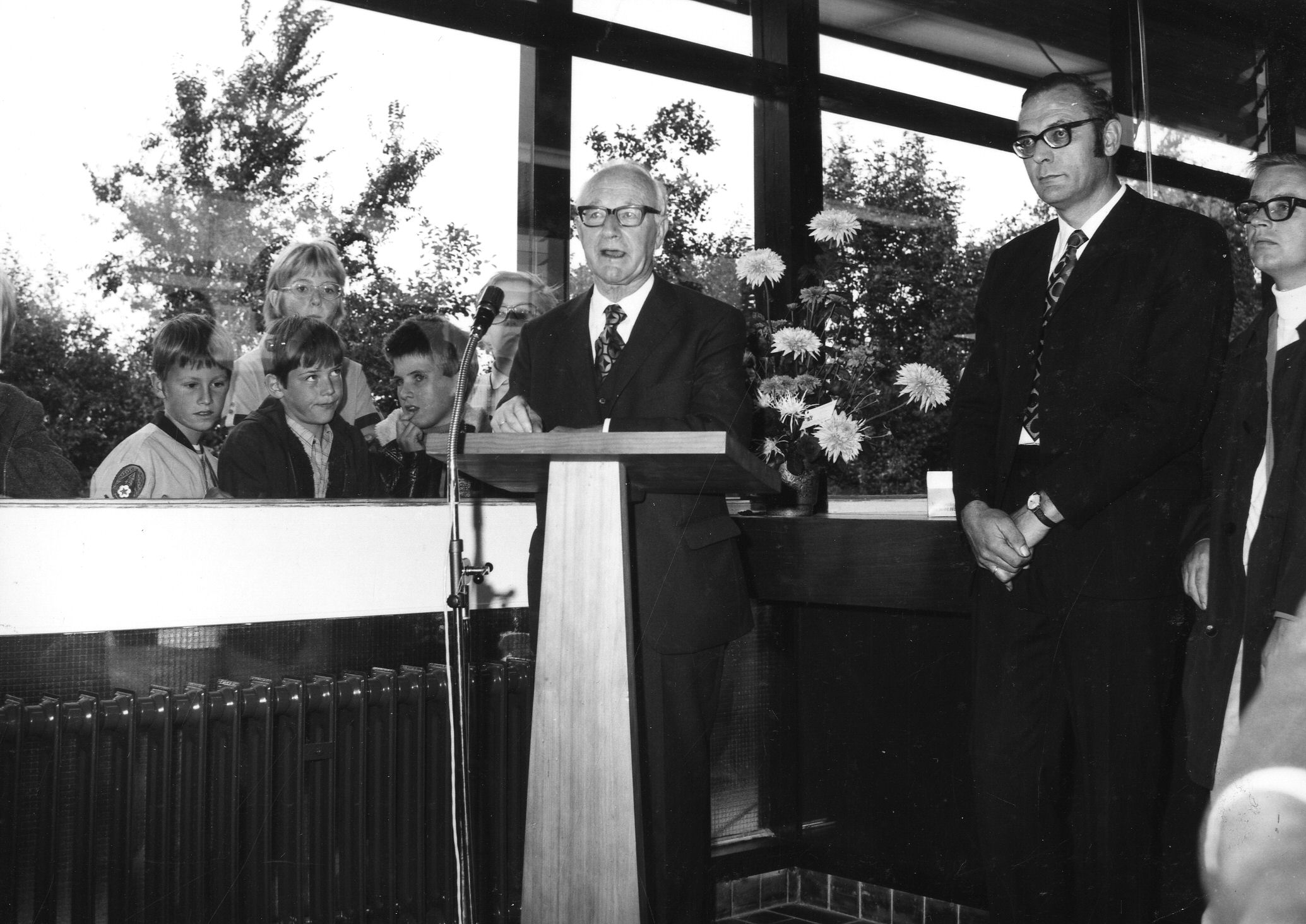
Then mayor of Purmerend giving a speech at the opening of the station

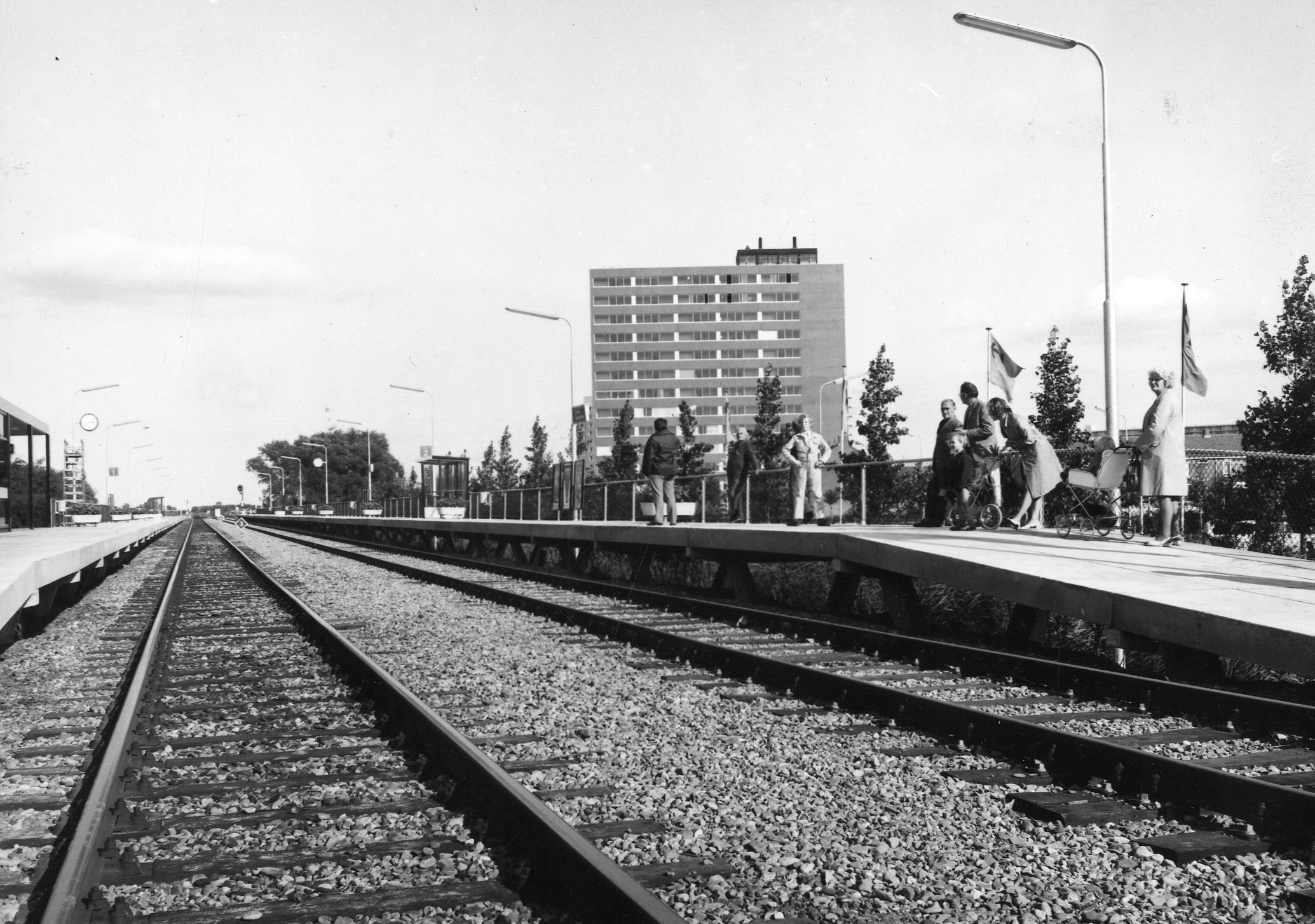
The train station on the day it opened

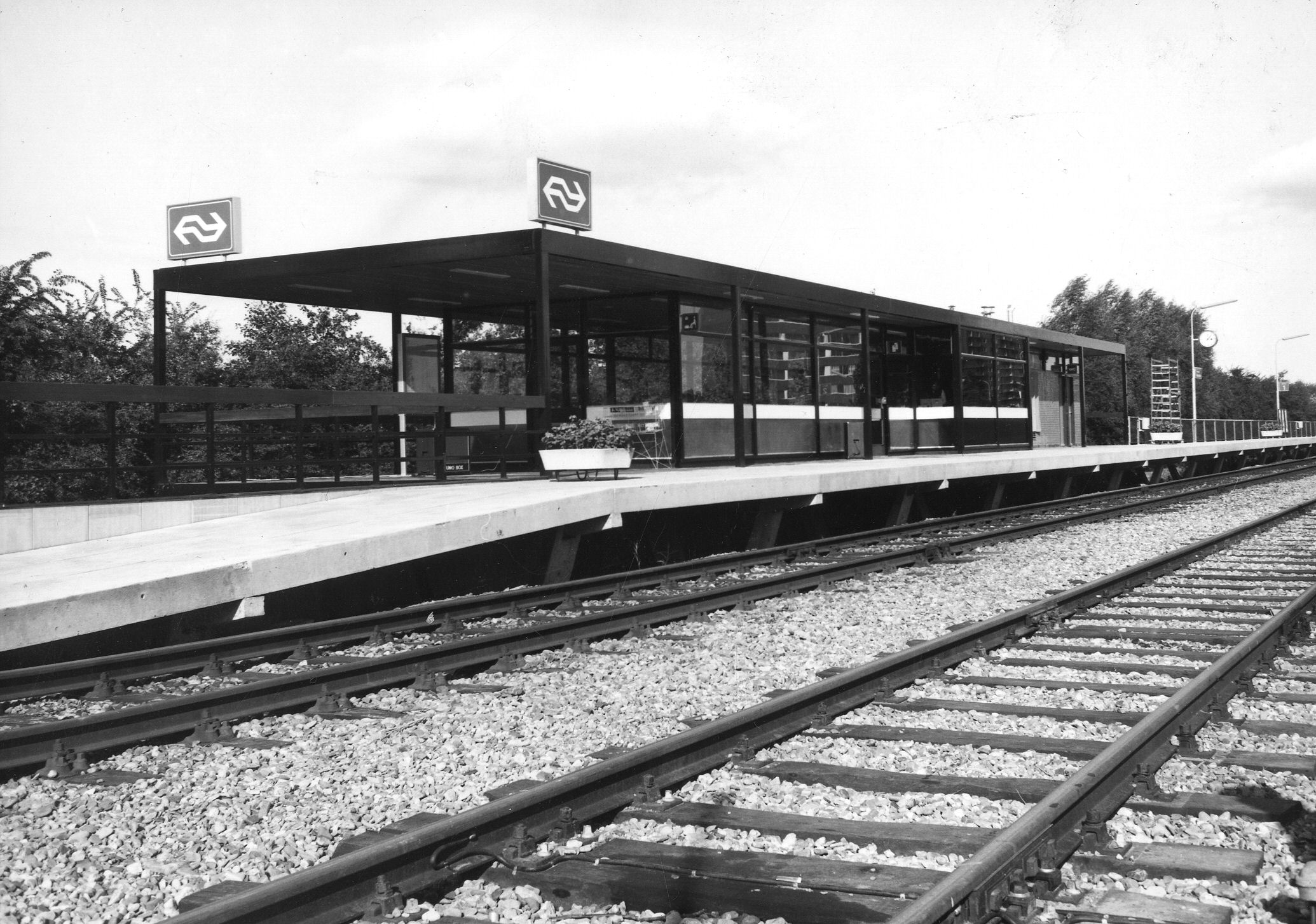
The station building on the day of the opening
