= Purmerend railway station =

Railway station in the Netherlands

Purmerend
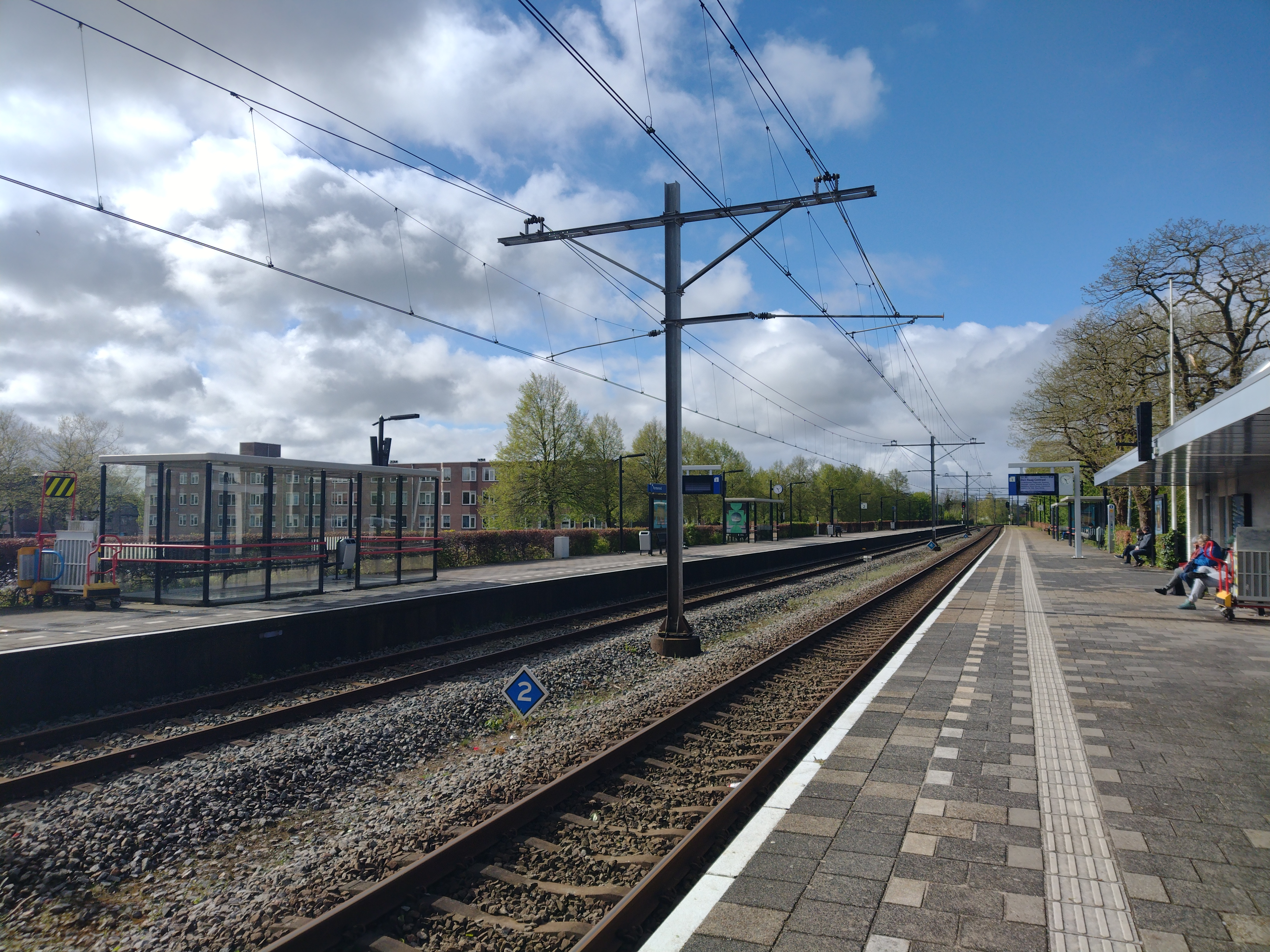
- Station Purmerend in 2024

General information
- Location: Netherlands
- Coordinates: 52°30′12″N 4°57′15″E
- Line: Zaandam–Enkhuizen railway
- Platforms: 2
- Tracks: 2

History
- Opened: May 1884

Services
Preceding station	Nederlandse Spoorwegen	Following station
Amsterdam Sloterdijk towards Amsterdam Centraal	NS Intercity 3700 Mon-Thur Peak Only	Hoorn towards Enkhuizen
Purmerend Weidevenne towards Hoofddorp	NS Sprinter 4100	Purmerend Overwhere towards Hoorn Kersenboogerd
Location
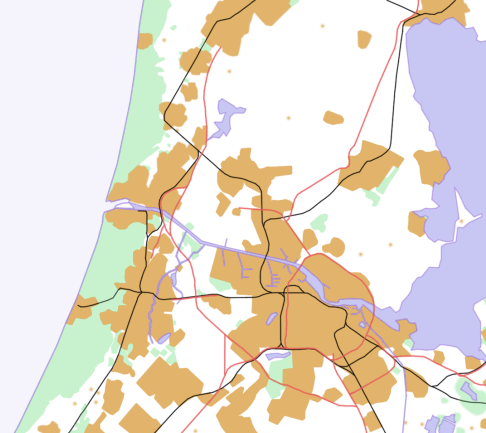
- Location within Northern Randstad Location within Netherlands

Purmerend is the railway station in the centre of Purmerend, Netherlands. The station opened on 20 May 1884 as part of the Zaandam–Hoorn railway, extended to Enkhuizen in 1885. The original station building was demolished in 1957. The station building, built in 1958, was used until February 1, 2008, when it had a small role as counter only open on weekdays from seven to eleven o'clock in the morning. Nowadays a Chinese restaurant is housed in the building.

== Train services ==
The following services currently call at Purmerend:

- 2x per hour local service (sprinter) Hoofddorp - Schiphol - Zaandam - Hoorn Kersenboogerd

Only during Rush Hour and peak direction Only:

- 2x per hour (Intercity) service Enkhuizen - Hoorn - Amsterdam

From December 2008, the direct connection with Amsterdam Centraal was lost, due to the Stoptrain 4500 becoming an Intercity, not stopping between Amsterdam Sloterdijk and Hoorn. Therefore, it is recommended to travel to Zaandam or Amsterdam Sloterdijk to get to the centre of Amsterdam.

The station is also served by two bus lines, 110 to Purmer North - Edam - Volendam - Katwoude - Monnickendam - Broek in Waterland - Schouw and Amsterdam Noord Metro Station and neighborhood bus 416 to Zuidoostbeemster - Middenbeemster - Westbeemster and De Rijp.

== Gallery ==
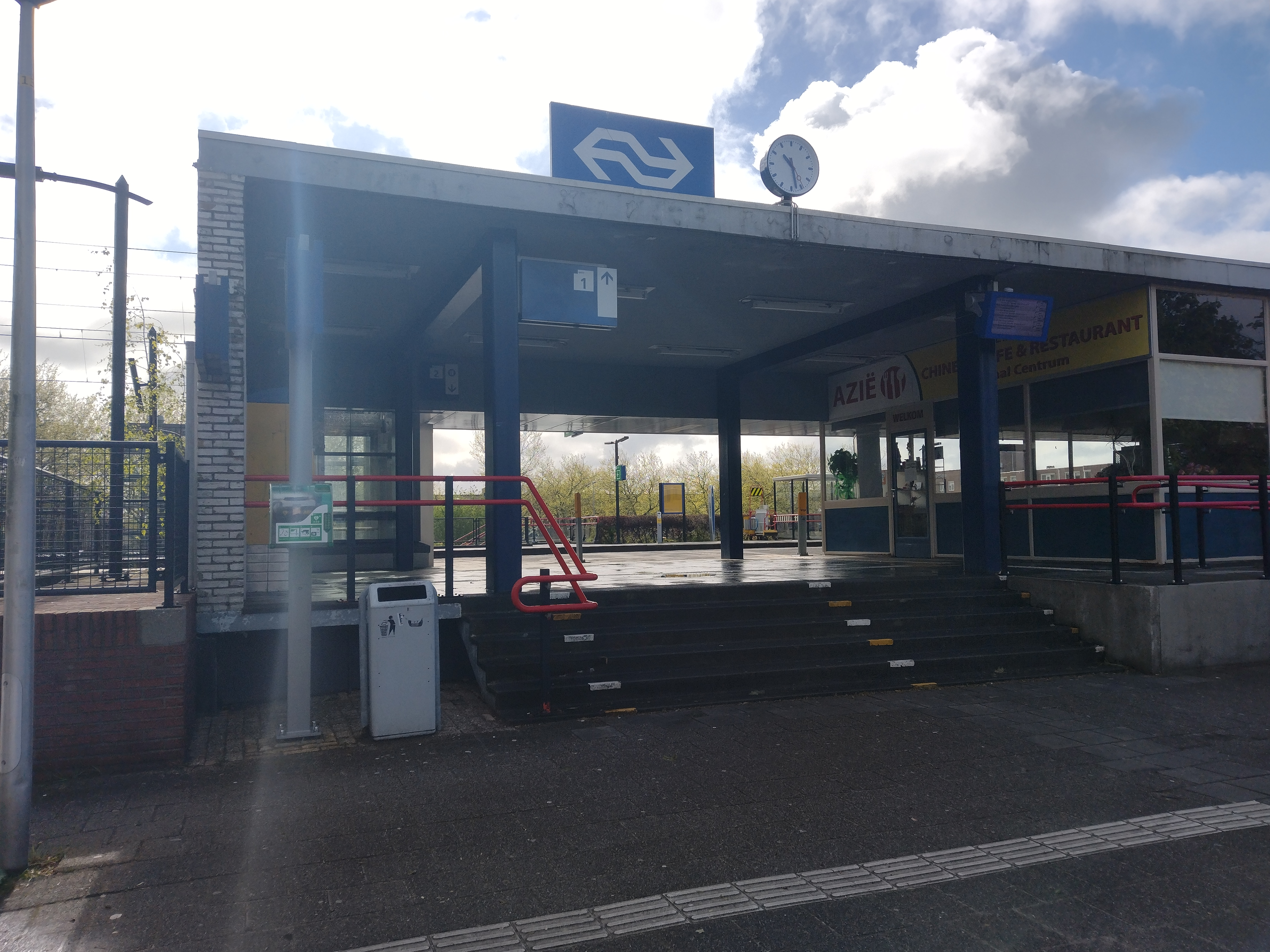
Main entrance to the station next to the station building

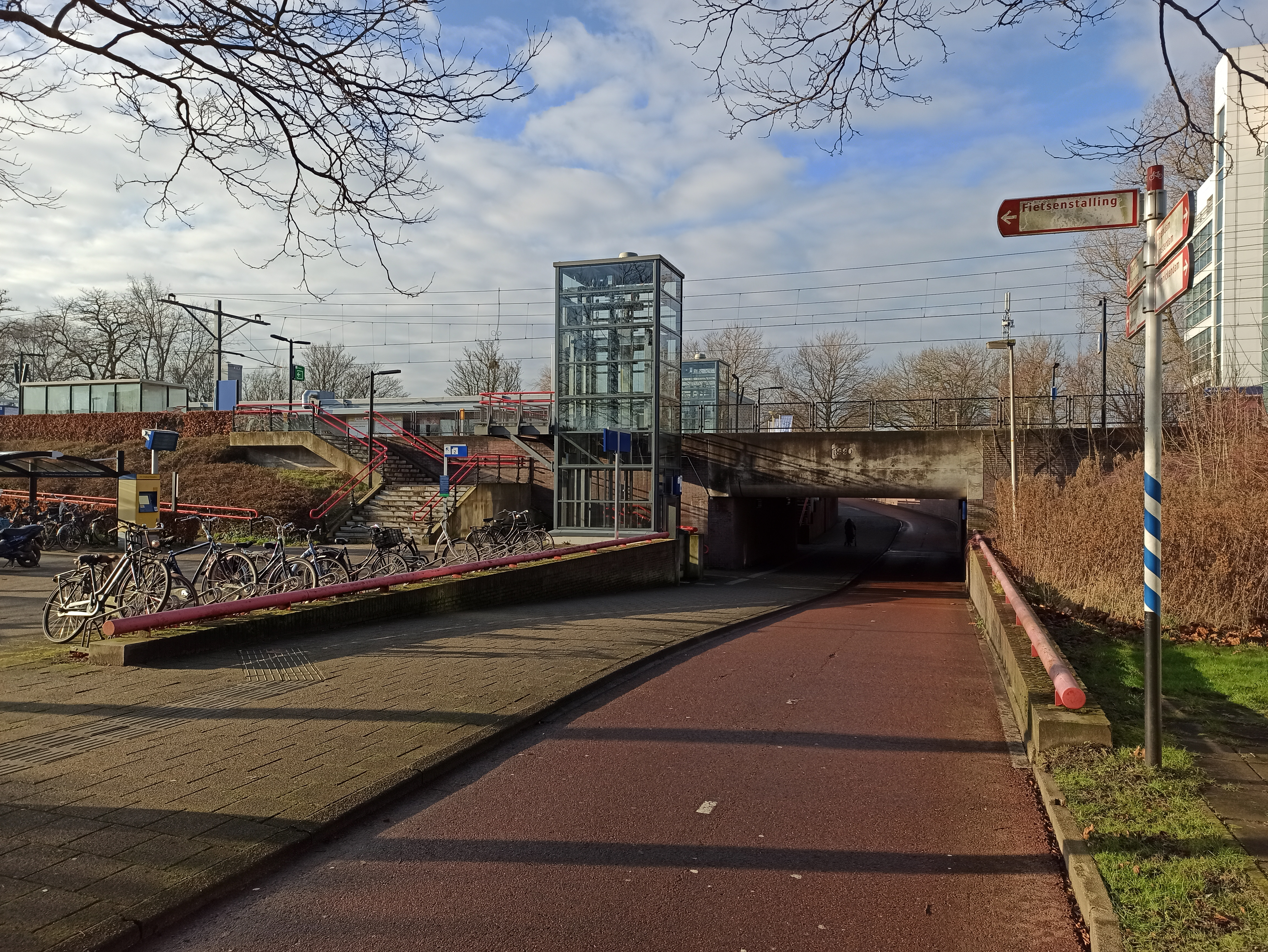
Other side of the station with elevator access

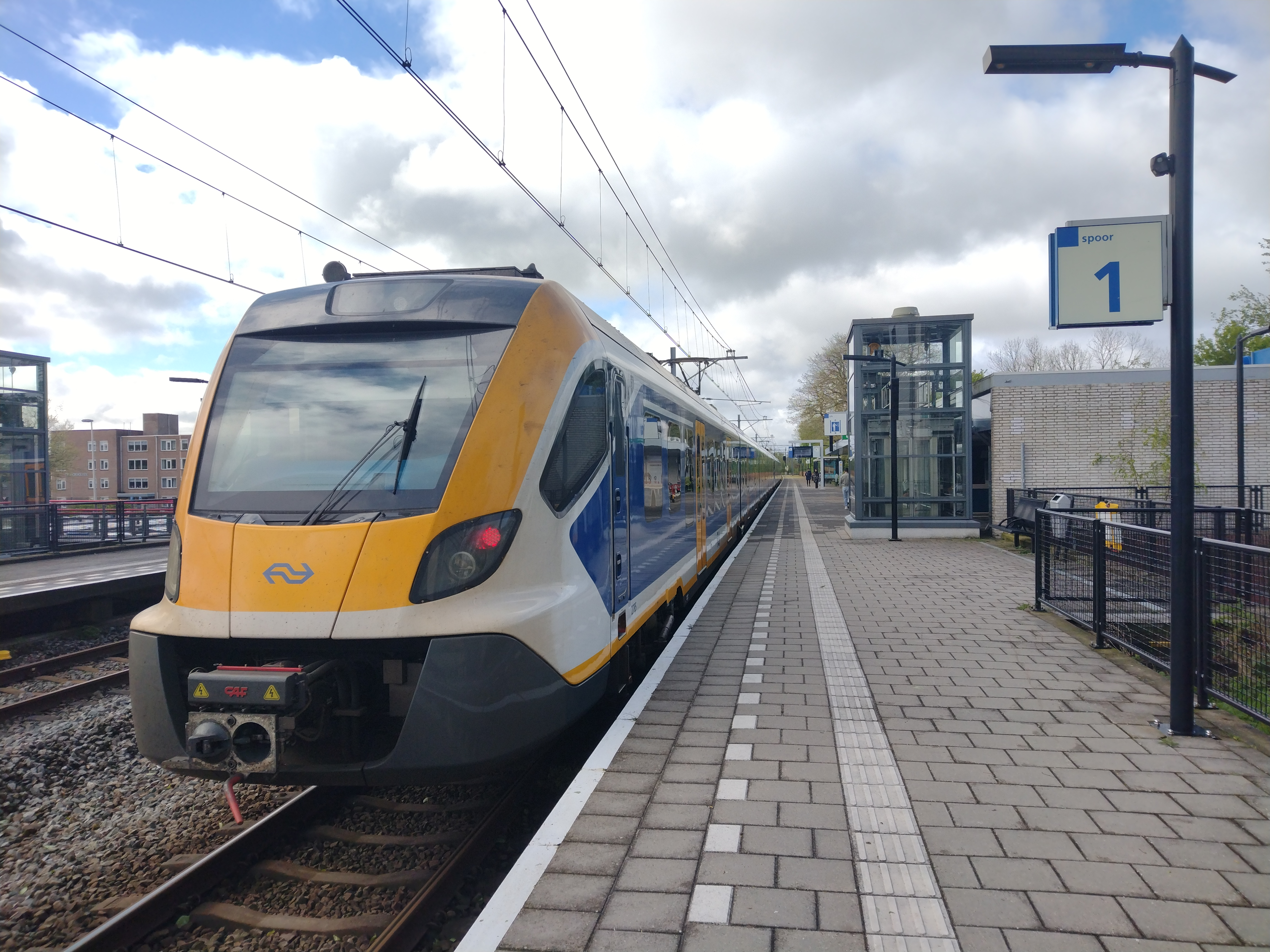
A stopped NS Sprinter on its way to Den Haag Centraal

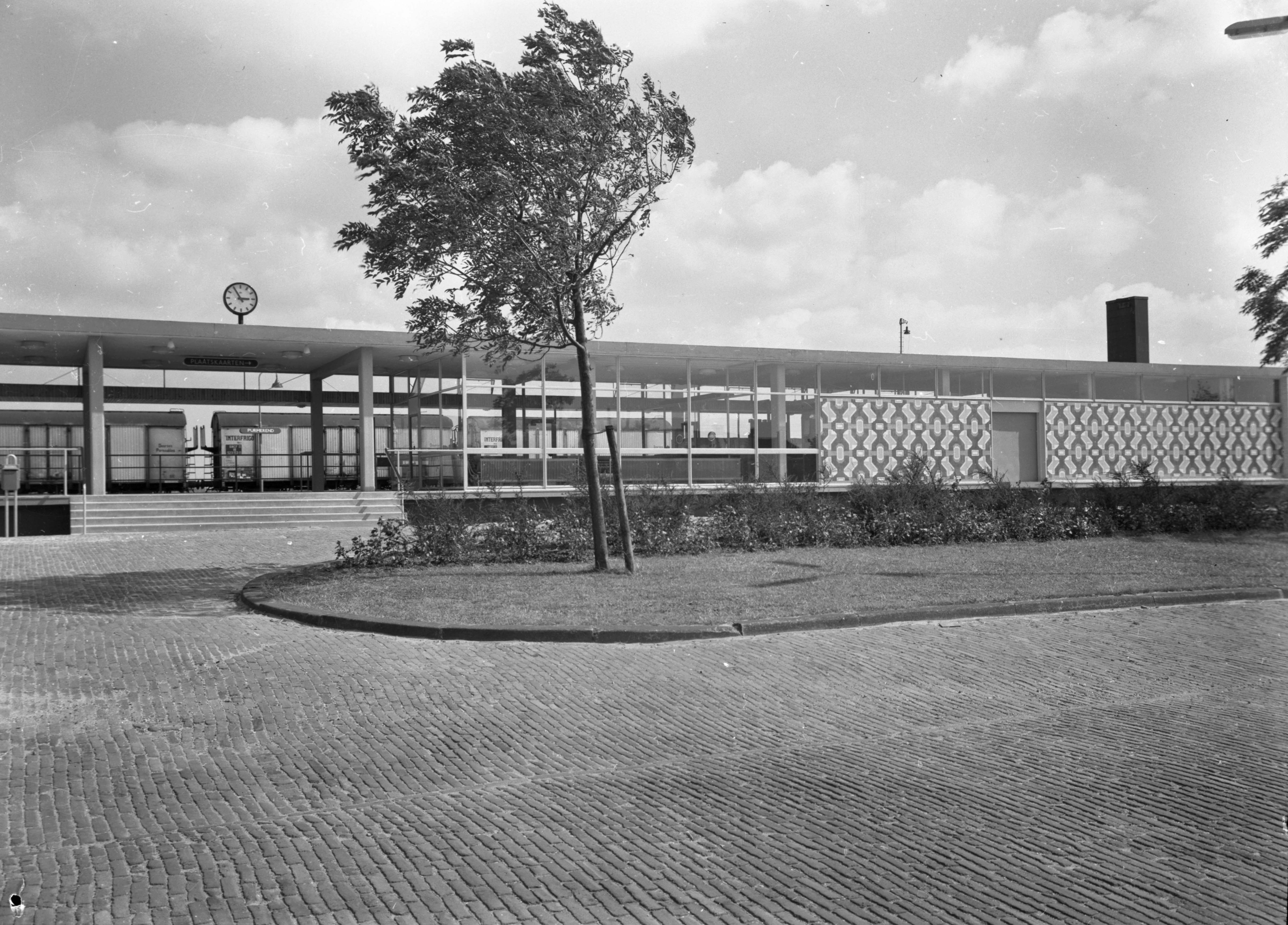
Entrance to the station next to the station building in July 1958

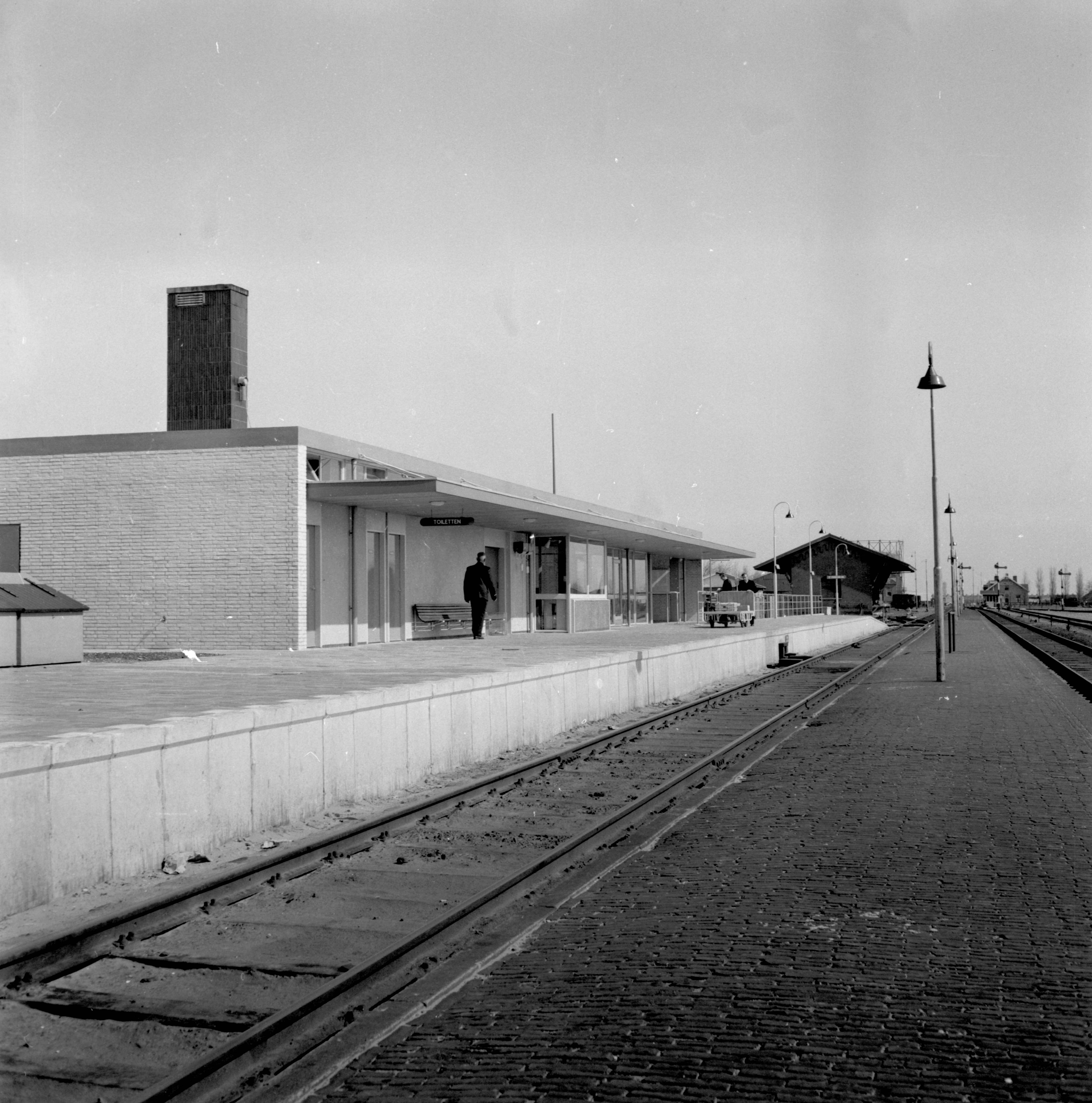
View from another platform onto the newly renovated station building in April 1958
