= Purmer =

- Village
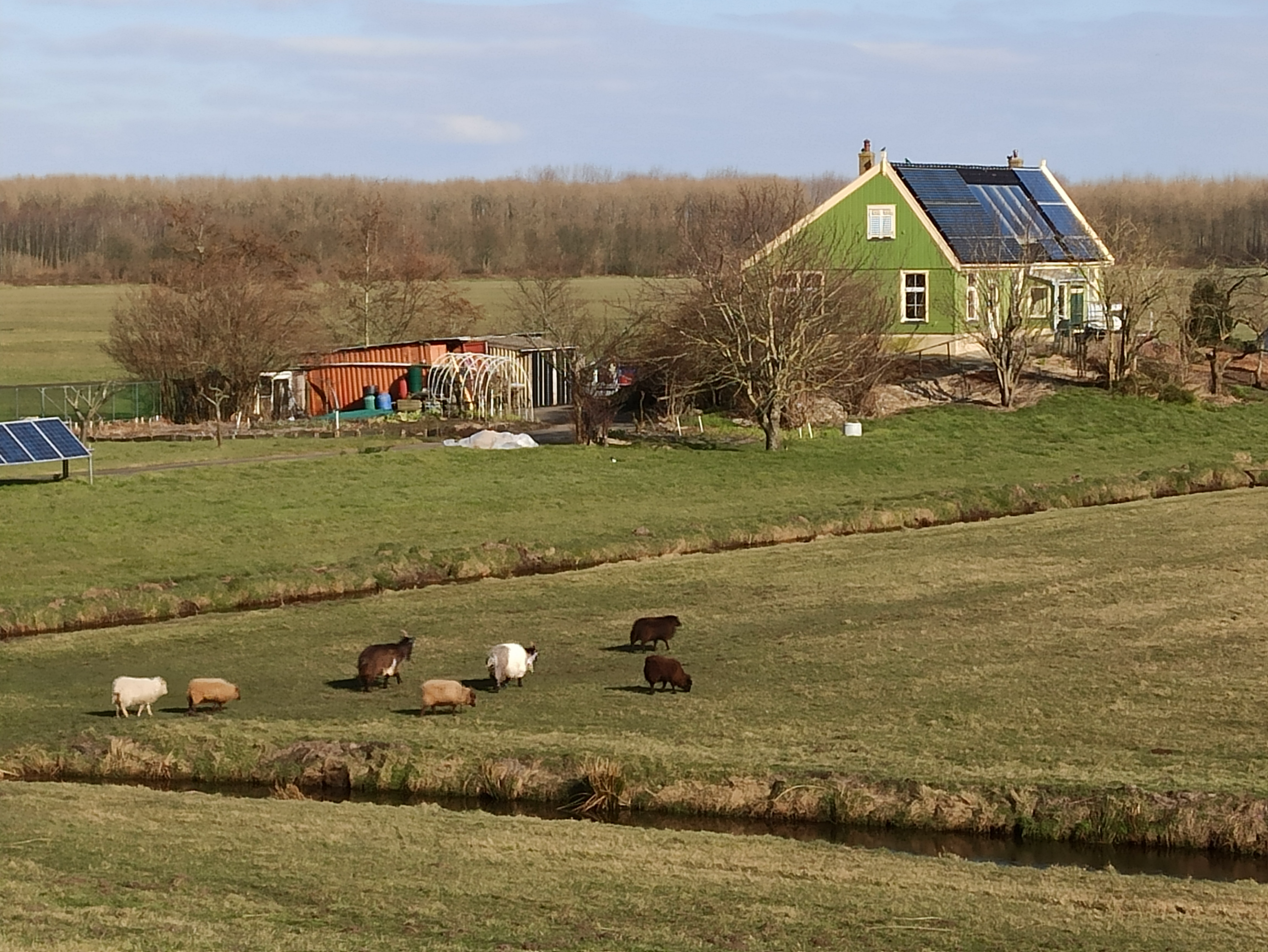
- Nes Polder

- Location in the Netherlands Location in the province of North Holland in the Netherlands
- Coordinates: 52°29′28″N 5°00′38″E
- Country: Netherlands
- Province: North Holland
- Municipality: Edam-Volendam; Waterland

Area
  - Total: 12.08 km^{2} (4.66 sq mi)
- Elevation: −3.6 m (−12 ft)

Population (2021)
  - Total: 260
  - Density: 22/km^{2} (56/sq mi)
- Time zone: UTC+1 (CET)
  - Summer (DST): UTC+2 (CEST)
- Postal code: 1481 & 1482
- Dialing code: 0299

Purmer is a polder and reclaimed lake in the Netherlands province of North Holland, located between the towns of Purmerend and Edam-Volendam. It is also a village located in the municipalities of Waterland and Edam-Volendam.

== Purmer polder ==
Windmill reclamation activity began in 1618. Hydraulic engineer Jan Adriaanszoon Leeghwater also had stakes in the reclamation, although he was not directly involved in the project itself. In 1622 all 26.8 km^{2} (10.3 sq mi) were clear of water.

The original lake of Purmer formed part of a small number of landlocked minor seas located in North Holland. Other examples of such minor seas are the lakes of Beemster and Schermer. All these lakes were directly connected to open sea, so salt water could flow in and tidal movements occurred. Purmer lake was connected to both the Zuyderzee inlet and to Beemster lake.

The Purmer's being directly connected to open sea resulted in large-scale shoreline erosion due to wave dynamics and water currents. The high rate of erosion and the need for arable land gave rise to plans for reclamation. Once reclaimed, Purmer was given to farming, but the polder is now highly urbanised. Most of this urban sprawl is due to the town of Purmerend, which has derived its name from Purmer (the "end of Purmer"). During the 1980s and '90s Purmerend had two residential areas built in Purmer, Purmer-Noord and Purmer-Zuid. In contrast to Beemster and Schermer, Purmer is not a municipality in its own right, being divided among the municipalities of Purmerend, Edam-Volendam, and Waterland.

== Gallery ==
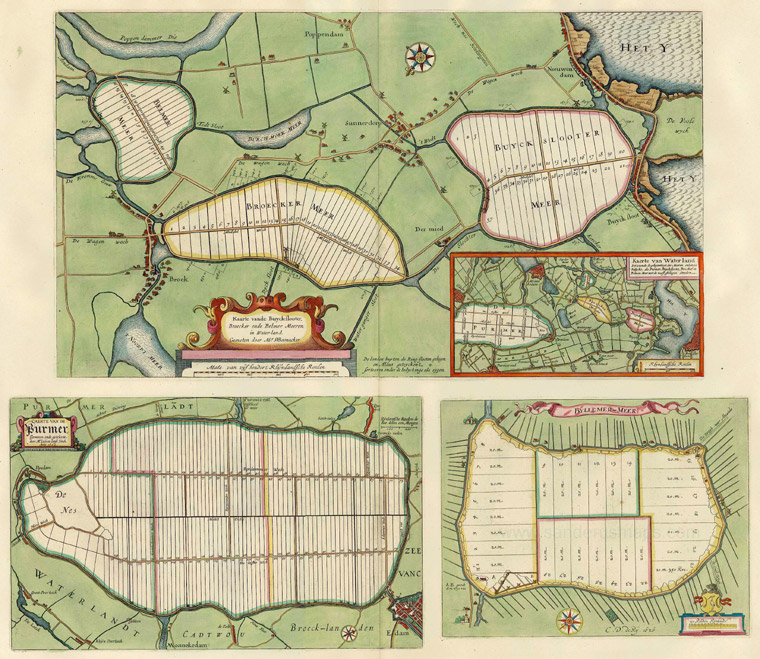
the newly reclaimed Purmer polder at bottom left, map drawn by Willem Blaeu

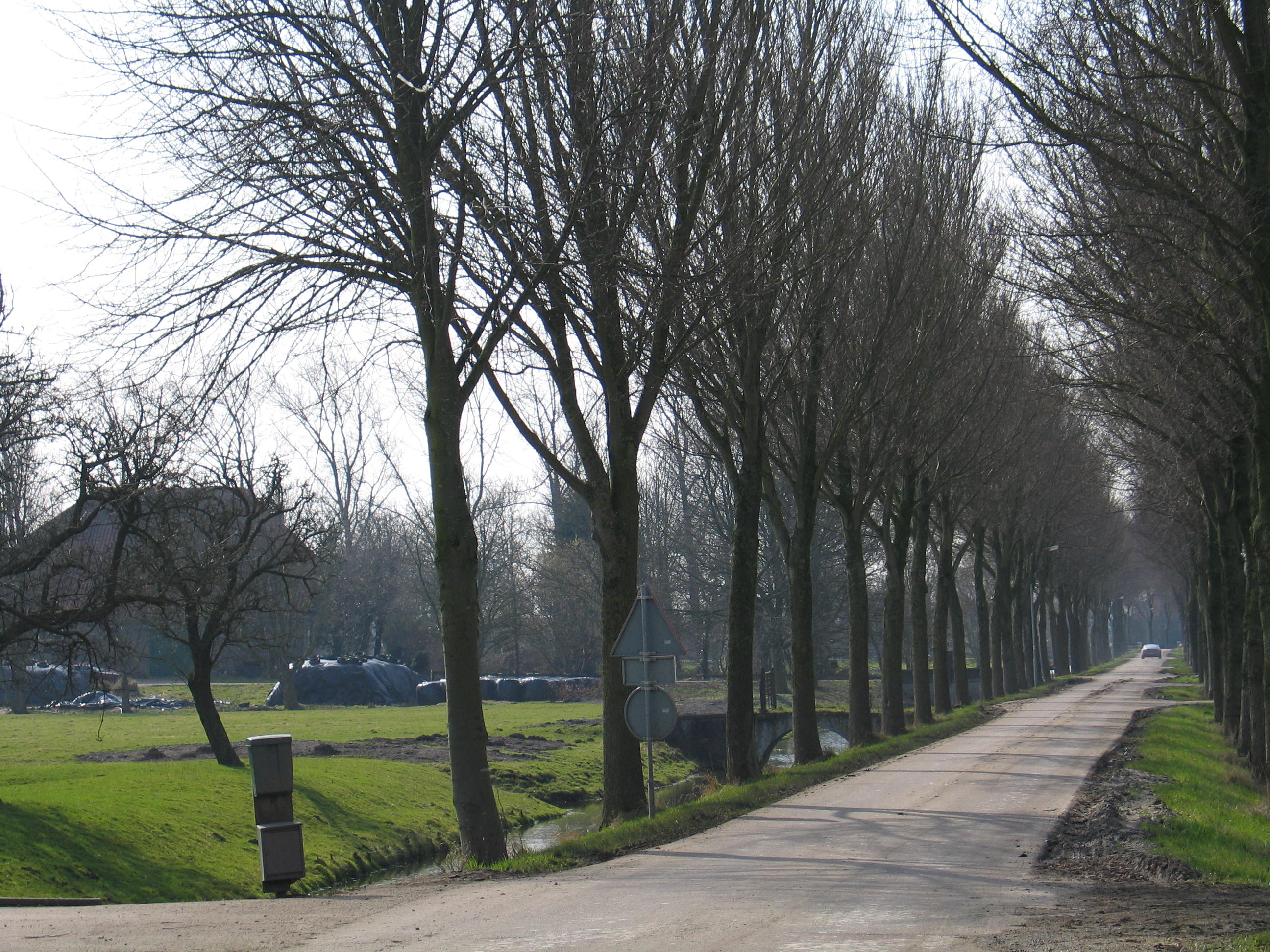
Crossing in the Purmer
