= Johan van Banchem =

Johan van Banchem (1615 – before 4 October 1694) was one of the leaders of the lynching of Johan de Witt and Cornelis de Witt on 20 August 1672. He was rewarded for this crime with an appointment as baljuw of The Hague by Stadtholder William III. After a few years in this function he was arrested and convicted for gross abuse of his office. He was sentenced to death on 26 November 1680 by the Hof van Holland (the main court of law in the province of Holland), but appealed the verdict to the Hoge Raad van Holland en Zeeland (the supreme court of the Dutch Republic). He died in jail before this appeal was finished.

== Biography ==
Van Banchem (alternately spelled Bancken) was born in The Hague, the son of Jan Gerritsz. van Banchem, a bailiff of the Hoge Raad van Holland en Zeeland (a namesake was the fourth president of this court, but in view of the father's patronym probably not the grandfather of Johan). He married Anna Deijm in 1649 and had several children from this marriage. He practiced law before the Hof van Holland (the main court of the province, the Hoge Raad being the federal supreme court) before he was co-opted into the Hague vroedschap in 1655. In 1672 he was elected a schepen of The Hague. He was known as an ardent Orangist and an enemy of the Grand Pensionary Johan de Witt.

=== Murder of the De Witt brothers ===
The year 1672 is also known as the Year of Disaster in Dutch history, because through a concerted attack France, England, Münster and Cologne had conquered a large part of the Republic and brought about the end of the First Stadtholderless Period. William III had been appointed Stadtholder of Holland and Zeeland in early July, and Johan de Witt had resigned his office of Grand Pensionary on August 4, after having been severely wounded in an assassination attempt. He and his brother Cornelis were held responsible for the dire straits of the Republic by the common people, who also resented his policy of trying to prevent the elevation of William to the stadtholderate.

In mid-August Cornelis de Witt was falsely accused of a conspiracy to murder William. He was arrested and tortured, but refused to confess. He was then convicted of perjury because he denied knowing his accuser, a barber by the name of Tichelaar, and sentenced to banishment. The next day his brother Johan was lured to the jail, where Cornelis was recovering from the torture. When they were both in the jail the building was surrounded by the Hague civic militia, who were fiercely Orangist, because there were rumors that Cornelis would be allowed to escape.

Now Van Banchem, in his official capacity of alderman, made the officers of the militia swear an oath that they would prevent the escape of the De Witts. He started to incite the mob that was milling about the jail. After a detachment of federal cavalry had conveniently been withdrawn, the militia led by Van Banchem, Tichelaar, and a silversmith by the name of Hendrik Verhoeff stormed the jail. The brothers were dragged from the building and shot by the militia. The bodies were then left to the depredations of the Mob.

After this lynching, William, who probably was not in on the conspiracy to murder the De Witt brothers by van Banchem and the Rotterdam Regent Johan Kievit and his brother-in-law Cornelis Tromp (who had given the signal for the assault on the jail), nevertheless prevented attempts by the authorities to punish those responsible. He even rewarded them by doling out pensions (to Tichelaar) and high offices. Van Banchem was made baljuw of The Hague on 20 September 1672.

=== Career as baljuw ===
As baljuw (the equivalent of a Schout) Van Banchem was both public prosecutor and head of police. His office did not pay a formal salary, but he was allowed to retain certain fines levied, and could also negotiate transactions with suspects to avoid prosecution. This was all above board in itself. However, Van Banchem started to abuse his position by falsely imprisoning innocent people in his private jail (the official Hague jail was a federal institution and not under his jurisdiction), and holding them for ransom. He also blackmailed clients of Hague prostitutes, who were often employed by Van Banchem to engineer compromising situations.

He was arrested in 1676 on multiple charges of extortion and false imprisonment. It is not unlikely that the attorney-general exacted some measure of revenge for the events of 1672 when he stringently prosecuted Van Banchem for crimes that were not unusual in those days. Van Banchem was even tortured. He was convicted and sentenced to death on 26 November 1680 by the Hof van Holland.

However, Van Banchem appealed the conviction to the Hoge Raad van Holland en Zeeland. While awaiting this appeal he managed to escape from jail in 1684. He fled to Amsterdam, where he tried to get the protection of burgomaster Coenraad van Beuningen. Van Beuningen, however, suspected him of plans to assassinate him and denounced him to the Amsterdam schout. Banchem was brought back to The Hague and now more securely locked up in the same jail where he had dragged the De Witt brothers from.

Meanwhile, his appeal dragged on and he died in 1694, still in jail. He was buried in the Hague on 4 October 1694.

== Sources ==
- (in Dutch) "Banchem, Van", in: Historisch Genootschap (1906) Werken. Derde Serie No. 22. Register op de Journalen van Constantijn Huyghens, Jr., p. 17
