= Johan Kievit =

Dutch politician and regent (1627-1692)

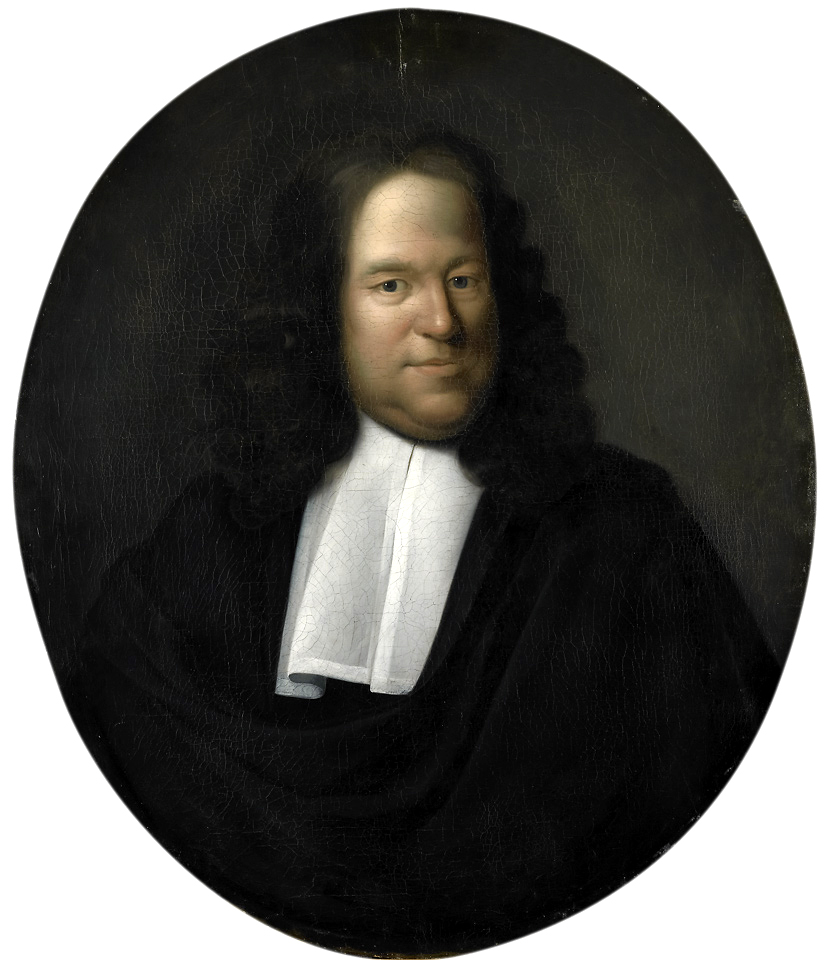
Johan Kievit by Pieter van der Werff

Johan Kievit (1627–1692) was a Dutch politician who was a prominent Orangist Rotterdam Regent, who may have been one of the instigators of the murder of former Grand Pensionary Johan de Witt, of the Dutch Republic, and his brother Cornelis de Witt on 20 August 1672, together with his brother-in-law, Cornelis Tromp.

== Biography ==
=== Early life ===
Johan Kievit (first name sometimes spelled Joan or Johannes; last name variously given as Kievidt or Kiewit) was the son of Nicolaas Kievit and Dieuwertje Pauw, both of well-known Rotterdam families. He married Alida Tromp, the daughter of lieutenant admiral Maarten Tromp on 27 April 1653 when she was only 16 (and he 26). He practiced law before the Hof van Holland (the main law court of the province of Holland) before going into politics in 1659, when he became a member of the Rotterdam vroedschap. In May 1666 he was appointed a member of the Gecommitteerde Raden (Committed Councillors - the Executive) of the States of Holland and West Friesland.

=== The Buat-conspiracy ===
Kievit was a partisan of the young Prince of Orange, William III, who had been excluded from high office by the States-Party regent faction of Johan de Witt during the First Stadtholderless Period. As such, he became involved in the treasonous correspondence of Henri de Fleury de Coulan, lord of Buat, better known as "cavalry-captain Buat," with the English court of William's uncle Charles II of England during the Second Anglo-Dutch War. Buat was executed for treason, but Kievit managed to escape to England. He was sentenced to death for his part in the conspiracy in absentia. In England he became a favorite of Charles, who made him a baronet.

Even before the conspiracy was discovered, Kievit was fired from his position in the gecommitteerde raden because he published a libelous pamphlet entitled Brief van den heer van Sommelsdijk ("Letter of Lord Sommelsdijk"), in which he defended his brother-in-law lieutenant admiral Cornelis Tromp's conduct during the St. James's Day Battle, disparaging lieutenant admiral Michiel de Ruyter at the same time.

=== The murder of the De Witt brothers ===
When the Dutch Republic was attacked by France, England, and two German principalities in 1672, Kievit's political fortunes changed again. The attack caused a severe political crisis in the Dutch Republic during this Rampjaar ("Year of disaster"). Because of the military disaster, the De Witt regime was forced to retract the Perpetual Edict (1667) and to appoint Prince William first Captain general (in January), and later (in early July) Stadtholder of Holland and Zeeland. Kievit returned to the Republic and asked to be pardoned and get his office in the Rotterdam vroedschap back. He indeed received a full pardon, in August 1672, from the Prince (Johan de Witt had resigned his office of Grand Pensionary on 4 August). This enabled him to take part in the conspiracy with his brother-in-law Cornelis Tromp (who held a grudge against De Witt, after having been dismissed from the navy in 1666 because of the quarrel with De Ruyter), and several members of the Hague civic militia, who were close associates of Kievit, against the De Witt brothers, which resulted in their torture, lynching and mutilation on 20 August 1672.

=== Later career ===
Like other conspirators, such as Johan van Banchem (who became baljuw of The Hague), Kievit was rewarded for his crime by the new regime. He was first appointed Pensionary of the city of Rotterdam. After only one year in this prestigious office, he was appointed advocaat-fiscaal of the Admiralty of Rotterdam. As such, he supervised the collection of the customs duties (Convooien en licenten). This office apparently offered good possibilities for corrupt practices. Kievit was arrested on suspicion of embezzlement in 1686 and, after a lengthy trial in which his main defense was "that everybody did it," convicted and sentenced to banishment in 1689. However, his daughter Debora, who was married to a son of the governor-general of the Dutch East India Company (VOC) in Batavia, Cornelis Speelman, ransomed him for 20,000 guilders, which enabled him to live out his years in Rotterdam till his death in 1692.

== Legacy ==
- The Dutch poet and playwright Joannes Antonides van der Goes, who worked as a clerk at the Rotterdam Admiralty at the time Kievit was advocaat-fiscaal wrote a laudatory Verjaargedicht ("Birthday poem") in Kievit's honor, probably in 1678.
- The Dutch writer of humorous works, Aernout van Overbeke wrote burlesque letters, "Buyten gaets" to among others, Alida Tromp, the wife of Kievit, who himself is mentioned in these "letters".
- He was played by Derek de Lint in the 2015 Dutch film Michiel de Ruyter.

== Sources ==
- (in Dutch) Entry "Kievit, Johan" in: Aa, A.J. van der, et al. (1862) Biografisch Woordenboek der Nederlanden bevattende levensbeschrijvingen van zoodanige personen, die zich op eenigerlei wijze in ons Vaderland hebben vermaard gemaakt. Zevende deel, letter I, J en K, pp. 52–53.
