= First Stadtholderless Period =

1650–1672 Dutch historical period

- 1650–1672
Stadtholderate of William II	Stadtholderate of William III
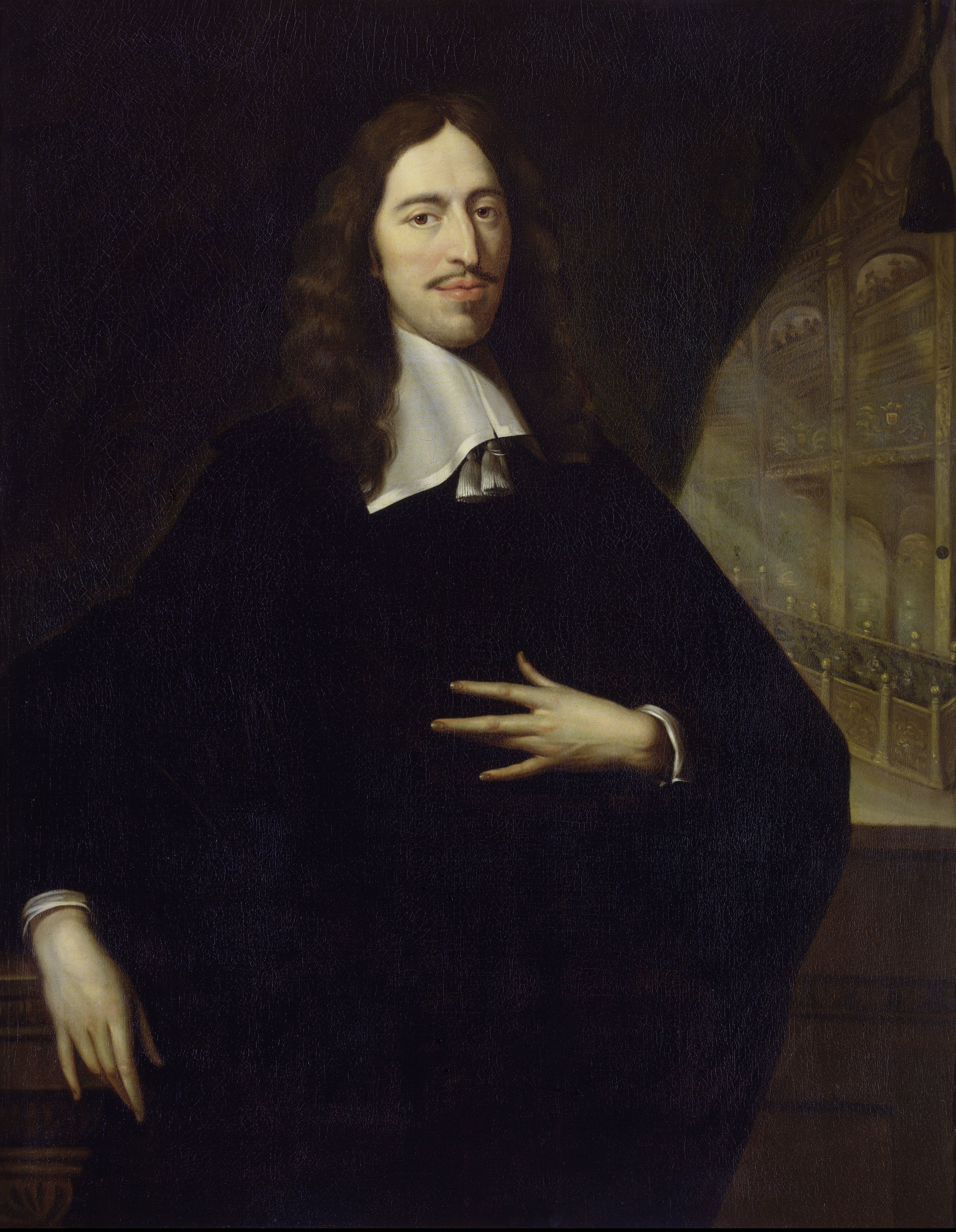
- Portrait of Johan de Witt, Grand Pensionary of Holland (by Jan Asselijn ca. 1652)
- Location: Dutch Republic
- Including: Dutch Golden Age; Rampjaar

The First Stadtholderless Period (1650–72; Dutch: Eerste Stadhouderloze Tijdperk) was the period in the history of the Dutch Republic in which the office of Stadtholder was vacant in five of the seven Dutch provinces (the provinces of Friesland and Groningen, however, retained their customary stadtholder from the cadet branch of the House of Orange). It coincided with the zenith of the Golden Age of the Republic.

The term has acquired a negative connotation in 19th-century Orangist Dutch historiography, but whether such a negative view is justified is debatable. Republicans argue that the Dutch state functioned very well under the regime of Grand Pensionary Johan de Witt, despite the fact that it was forced to fight two major wars with England, and several minor wars with other European powers. Thanks to friendly relations with France, a cessation of hostilities with Spain, and the relative weakness of other European great powers, the Republic for a while was able to play a pivotal role in the "European Concert" of nations, even imposing a pax nederlandica in the Scandinavian area. A convenient war with Portugal enabled the Dutch East India Company to take over the remnants of the Portuguese Empire in Ceylon and South India. After the end of the war with Spain in 1648, and the attendant end of the Spanish embargo on trade with the Republic that had favored the English, Dutch commerce swept everything before it, in the Iberian Peninsula, the Mediterranean Sea and the Levant, as well as in the Baltic region. Dutch industry, especially textiles, was as yet not hindered by protectionism. As a consequence, the Republic's economy enjoyed its last great economic boom.

Politically, the Staatsgezinde (Republican) faction of the ruling Dutch Regents such as Cornelis de Graeff and Andries Bicker reigned supreme. They even developed an ideological justification of republicanism (the "True Freedom") that went against the contemporary European trend of monarchical absolutism, but prefigured the "modern" political ideas that led to the American and French constitutions of the 18th century. There was a "monarchical" opposing undertow, however, from adherents of the House of Orange who wanted to restore the young Prince of Orange to the position of Stadtholder that his father, grandfather, great-uncle, and great-grandfather had held. The republicans attempted to rule this out by constitutional prohibitions, like the Act of Seclusion. But they were unsuccessful, and the Rampjaar ("Year of Disaster") of 1672 brought about the fall of the De Witt regime and the return to power of the House of Orange.

== The Stadtholderate of William II ==
The office of Stadtholder of a province predated the Republic. In the Habsburg Netherlands the Stadtholders were the representatives of the Sovereign (lately Philip II of Spain in his capacity of duke or count), who performed important constitutional functions, like appointing city magistrates (usually from double lists, drawn up by the vroedschap), and in times of war acting as provincial commander-in-chief. William the Silent had been such a stadtholder in Holland and Zeeland under the Habsburg regime, until he was removed from office in 1567. After the Dutch Revolt broke out, he simply reassumed that office in 1572 with the connivance of the rebel States of Holland, but still pretended to act in the name of the king. When the rebel provinces formed their defensive Union of Utrecht, whose treaty was to become the "constitution" of the Republic, they built upon the Habsburg constitutional framework, including the office of stadtholder. Even when independence from the King of Spain was declared with the Act of Abjuration there was no reason to change anything: the act simply declared that henceforth the magistrates, amongst whom the stadtholders, would hold their commissions from the from now on sovereign provincial states (there was no stadtholder on the federal level).

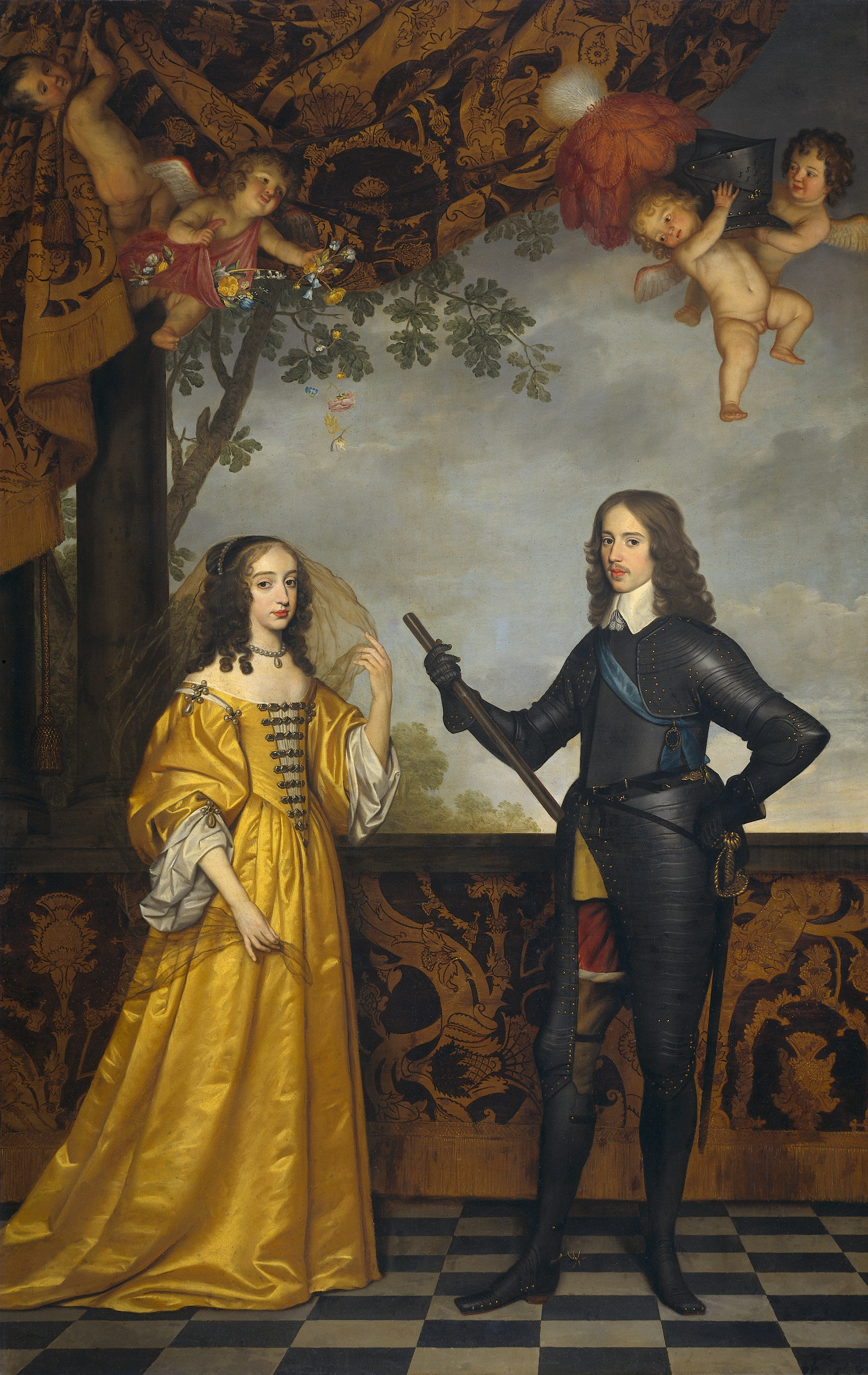
Willem II, prince of Orange, and his wife Maria Stuart (by Gerard van Honthorst, 1652)

Still, when after the death of William in 1584, and subsequently the end of the search for a new sovereign after the departure of Leicester the States General reluctantly accepted that they had to be sovereign in 1588, the office took on a vestigial character. Had it not been that the stadtholder of Holland was usually also elected to the confederal office of Captain general of the Union, which was an important office in time of war, one would have expected that the office might have been left vacant much earlier than eventually happened. However, in the circumstances of the ongoing war with Spain, the Captain-general was indispensable. And the office of stadtholder remained an important power-base, enabling its holder to exert an influence far beyond its formal powers.

Prince Maurice demonstrated this in the constitutional crisis of 1618, when the States of Holland under Johan van Oldenbarnevelt, asserting supreme provincial sovereignty, tried to hire provincial troops rather than federal troops under Maurice's command. Maurice stopped this with a coup d'état and subsequently asserted (with the assent of the other provinces) a federal sovereignty that superseded the provincial one. He also purged the Holland regents that supported the provincial-sovereignty pretensions of Oldenbarnevelt and so managed to acquire a political dominance in the government of the Republic that assumed almost monarchical proportions. His brother, and successor as stadtholder, Frederick Henry held on to this ascendancy, due to a deft policy of divide-and conquer, playing off the regent factions against each other.

When Frederick Henry died in March 1647, his son William II was appointed stadtholder in Holland, Zeeland, Utrecht, Overijssel, and Gelderland (the office was only to become hereditary in 1747). But he did not have the stature of his father, also because Frederick Henry did not think highly of his capabilities and had refused to allow him to lead troops in the field during the war against Spain that was then in its last stages. William was opposed to the peace with Spain, but he was largely ignored by the politicians in the States General, especially the representatives of the city of Amsterdam, Andries and Cornelis Bicker, the leaders of the do called "Bickerse league", as well as Cornelis de Graeff. The Peace of Münster was duly concluded in 1648, in spite of the opposition of the province of Zeeland and William, the latter deliberately absenting himself from the discussions to masque his impotence.

In the years directly following the peace a number of conflicts erupted between the stadtholder and especially the States of Holland about policy. William (though a lax Calvinist himself, like his father) keenly supported the Calvinist die-hards in their attempts to force the Protestant religion on the Catholic inhabitants of the recently acquired Generality Lands (though his father had been far more tolerant of Catholic freedom of conscience). William managed to gain much popularity by this hard-line policy among the more orthodox lower classes in the Republic-proper, but especially the Holland regents thwarted the policy, because they were aware of the needless resentment it caused.

This was, however, just political posturing on William's part, cynically exploiting certain prejudices in an attempt to gain ascendancy over the regents. More important as a matter of principle was the conflict over the reduction of the standing army that arose during 1649 and 1650. The regents around the Bicker family, Adriaan Pauw and De Graeff understandably did not quite see the need for an expensive, large, mercenary standing army in peacetime. Holland demanded a reduction of the army to 26,000 (from a level of 35,000 in 1648), whereas William argued that the personnel needs were now appreciably larger, because the territory to be protected by garrisoned fortresses was now a great deal larger. Though the parties came close to an agreement on a total of about 29,000 men, the final difference of a few hundred men proved to be insurmountable.

The policy conflict had become a test of wills. And it soon grew into a constitutional conflict, reminiscent of the crisis of 1618. The majority in the States of Holland now revived the old constitutional theory of Oldenbarnevelt and Hugo Grotius, stating that the provinces' sovereignty, and not that of the federal state, was supreme, and that Holland was entitled to disband troops that were paid out of its contribution to the federal war budget, without the consent of the other provinces. The implication of this was, of course, that the dissolution of the Union was a possibility, with a probability of civil war.

Like his uncle Maurice, William now felt he needed to save the Union, if need be by force. In collusion with his colleague-stadtholder of Friesland and Groningen, Willem Frederik of Nassau-Dietz (a cousin in the cadet branch of the House of Orange-Nassau), he embarked on a campaign of intimidation of the Holland regents that would ultimately lead to the use of force. On 30 July 1650 William had six leading Holland regents arrested in The Hague (where the States General met), while Willem Frederik attempted to take the city of Amsterdam by surprise with federal troops. Though this coup de main failed and Amsterdam managed to keep the troops outside the gates, the city was sufficiently intimidated to give in to William's demands to purge his opponents from the Amsterdam city council. The States of Holland then capitulated and rescinded its order to disband the troops. The theory of provincial supremacy was disavowed also.

However, William was stricken with smallpox in his hour of triumph. He died suddenly in November 1650. His wife Mary Stuart was pregnant and gave birth to his only legitimate son William III a week after his death. The office of stadtholder had become vacant in five of the provinces.

== The Republican regime and Johan de Witt ==
If the Republic had been a monarchy, or if the office of stadtholder had already been hereditary (as it was to become after the Orangist amendments of 1747) the posthumous child would no doubt have been acclaimed stadtholder automatically, and a Regency would have been put into place, as happened in 1751, when three-year-old William V succeeded his deceased father in office in all seven provinces. As a matter of fact, this was proposed by the Orangist faction in the Republic, and especially by Willem Frederik, who proposed himself in the role of Lieutenant-Stadtholder in the five provinces in which he was not already stadtholder in his own right, until baby William would come of age. But this proposal elicited little enthusiasm from the Holland regents, who still vividly remembered his role in the recent coup.

On the other hand, if the office of stadtholder was indispensable, the States of the five provinces with a vacancy could and would have appointed a successor, though not necessarily someone from the Nassau families. As a matter of fact, there were the precedents of Willem IV van den Bergh and Adolf van Nieuwenaar in Gelderland in early Republican times. But the Holland regents did not feel a pressing need to appoint anyone, especially in view of recent events. They acted very quickly to undo the effects of William's coup, freeing the captive regents and reinstating them in their offices. The Gecommitteerde Raden (executive committee) of the States of Holland moved immediately to reassert their authority over the army and convened a plenary session of the States. Next Holland proposed in the States General that a so-called Great Assembly (a kind of constitutional convention) should be convened at short notice, to amend the Union of Utrecht.

The States of Holland did not await this assembly, however, but for their own province immediately started to make constitutional alterations. On 8 December 1650 the States formally took over their Stadtholders' powers. The eighteen voting towns in the States were given the option to apply for a charter that enabled them to henceforth elect their own vroedschap members and magistrates, under ultimate supervision of the States, but otherwise without the usual drawing up of double lists, for outsiders to choose from. This did not apply to the non-voting towns, however, that still had to present double lists, but now to the States, instead of the Stadtholder. The States also assumed the power to appoint magistrates in the unincorporated countryside, like drosten and baljuws.

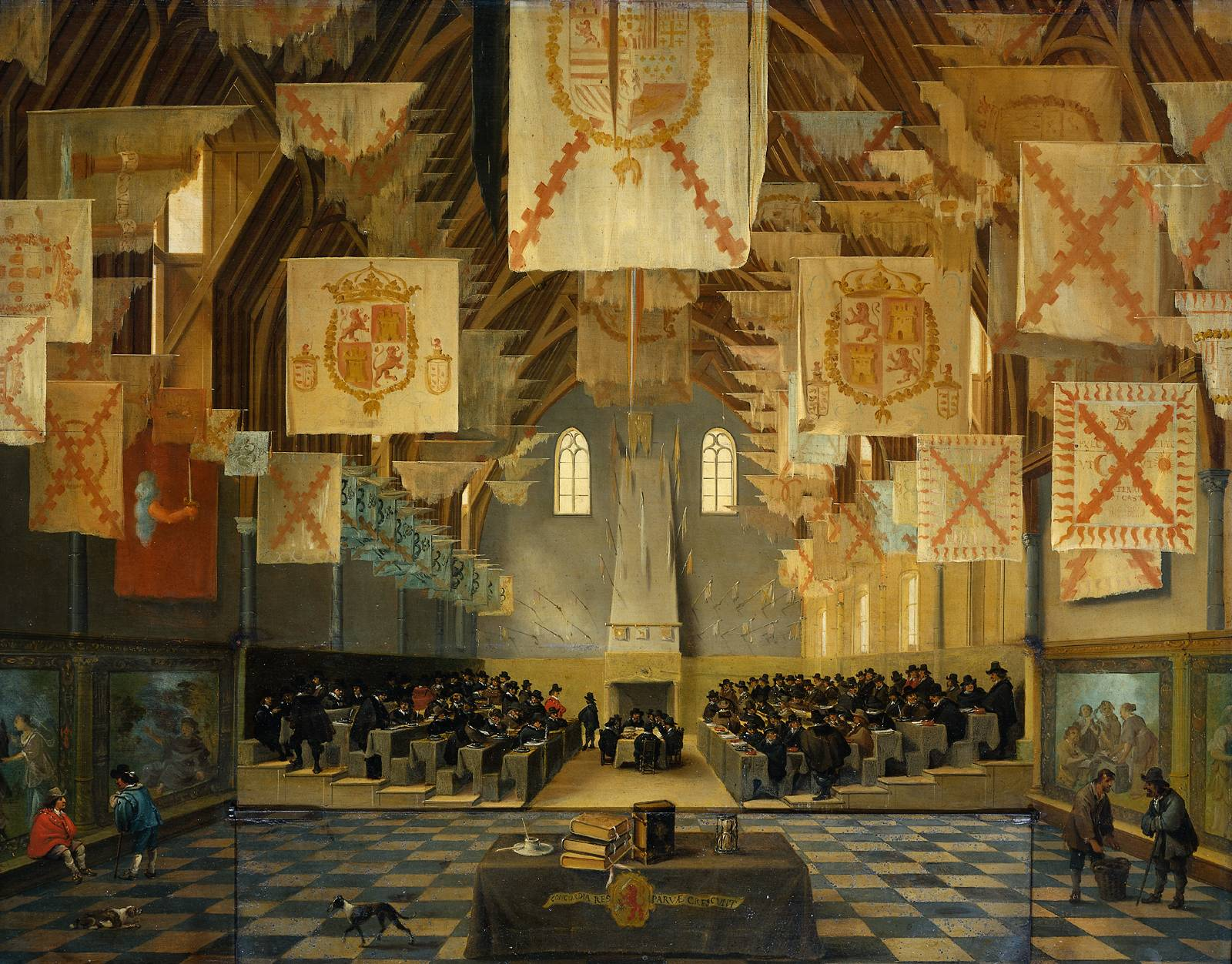
Great Assembly of 1651 by Dirck van Delen

This did imply a significant change in the power structure in the province. The position of the city regents was improved, while the ridderschap (the oligarchical representative body of the nobility in the States, that had one vote, equal to one city) lost influence, especially in the countryside. The change also diminished the power of the representative bodies of the Dutch guilds in the cities, that had often acted as a check on the power of the vroedschap with the help of the stadtholder. The change therefore did not go unopposed, and caused some rioting by the groups being disenfranchised.

Holland meanwhile encouraged other provinces to follow its example. In Zeeland a majority of the States voted to also leave the office of stadtholder vacant, and assume its powers. For good measure, the vote of the First Noble in the States of Zeeland (which was usually exercised by the Prince of Orange as Marquess of Veere and Flushing) was abolished, and the request of the Zeeland ridderschap to sit in his place was denied. In other provinces, the results were mixed. Holland sent a delegation to Gelderland (where the divided States voted to postpone a decision). Willem Frederik, meanwhile, with the help of the States of Friesland, Groningen, and Drenthe (where he was stadtholder) exhorted the States of Overijssel and Utrecht to appoint baby William (with him as lieutenant), but to no avail. These provinces decided to await the Great Assembly.

The Great Assembly that was held between January and August 1651, addressed a number of important issues. The first one was that of the stadholderate. Friesland and Groningen led the opposition to Holland, arguing that the Union of Utrecht required the appointment of provincial stadtholders by implication, as the articles 9 and 21 of the treaty stipulated mediation by stadtholders in case of conflicts between provinces. In their interpretation the office of stadtholder thereby acquired a federal aspect. But the other provinces were not convinced. They decided to leave the office vacant indefinitely. It should be noted, however, that the office was not abolished, not even in Holland and Zeeland.

A second important topic was the reorganization of the command structure of army and navy. The office of captain general and admiral general was a federal office. In the absence of the usual occupant of that office, the stadtholder of Holland, the question was who would now fill it. A possibility would have been to appoint Willem Frederik, who was after all a stadtholder, but in view of his role in the coup of the previous year, he did not have the confidence of Holland. It was therefore decided to leave this office also vacant, and to divide its functions between the States General and the Raad van State jointly (as far as appointments and promotions of officers was concerned) and the Holland nobleman Jan Wolfert van Brederode as commander-in-chief of the army with the rank of Field Marshal. The latter was only a temporary solution, however, as Brederode soon after died, which caused another round of intrigues to keep Willem Frederik from the top job in the army. As the function of admiral general had usually been only symbolic, the actual command of the fleets having been left in the hands of the lieutenant-admirals of the five Admiralties, this office did not pose a similar political problem.

The Great Assembly also addressed the problem of the Public Church in the country, but left the results of the Synod of Dort in place. It rejected the requests of the provinces of Brabant and Drenthe for representation on the States General. Seemingly, the results of the attempt at constitutional reform were meagre therefore. But appearances were not what they seemed. There had been a sea change in the political balance within the union by the elimination of the person who held five stadtholderships in his hand. The position of Holland became unassailable, on the one hand, because the other provinces were internally divided, and because there was not one leader (like the stadtholder had been) to lead them in opposition to Holland.

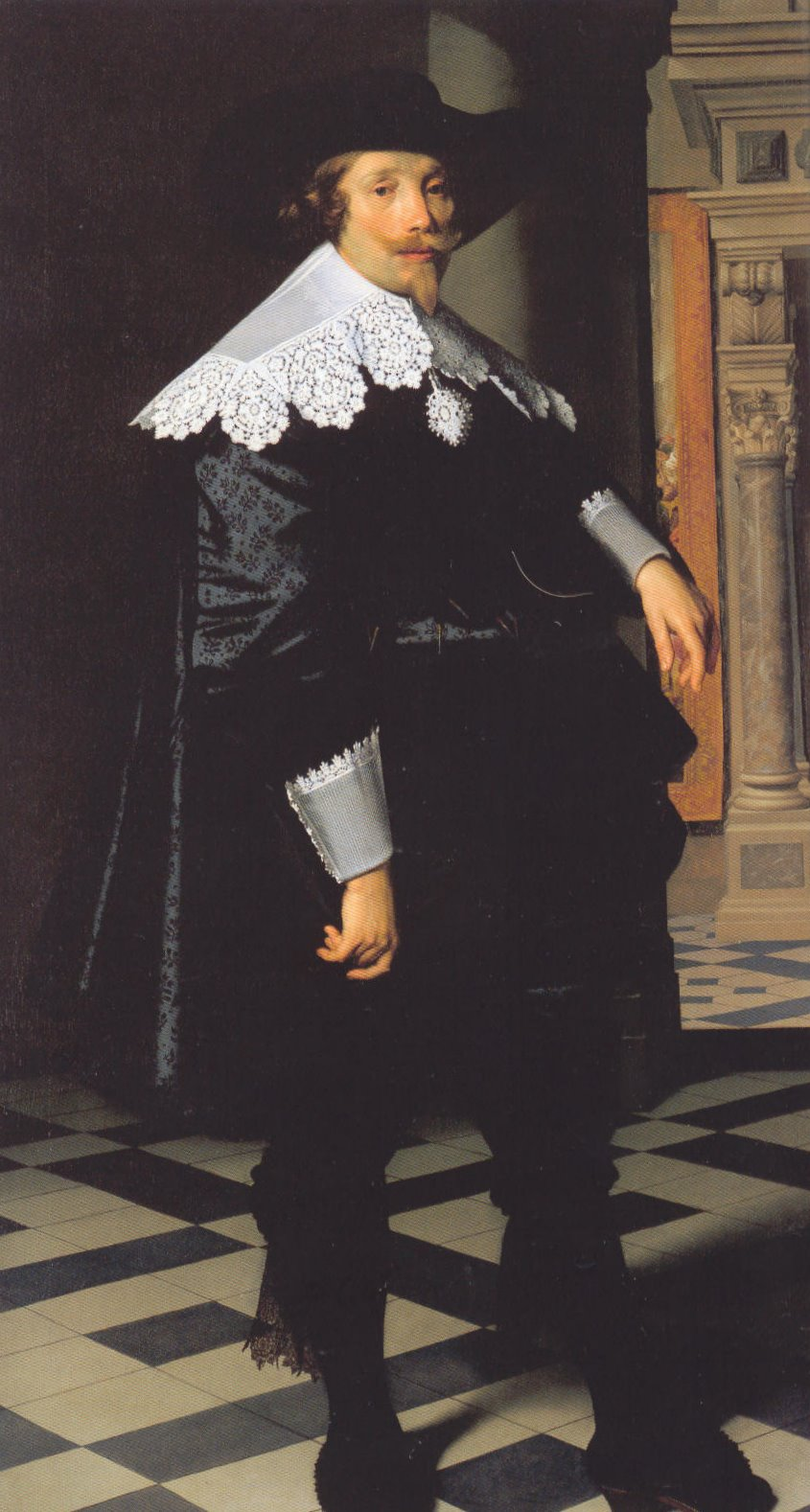
Portrait of Cornelis de Graeff, Regent of Amsterdam (by Nicolaes Eliaszoon Pickenoy 1636)

On the other hand, there was the fortuitous factor that soon in the province of Holland the office of Raadpensionaris was taken over by the young regent from Dordrecht, Johan de Witt. After the execution of the capable Oldenbarnevelt, this office had usually been filled by men of questionable competency, who in any case were compliant to the will of the Stadtholder, like Jacob Cats. First Adriaan Pauw and Andries Bicker and then De Witt and his uncles Cornelis de Graeff and Andries de Graeff were highly capable men, however, who took an active leading role, not only in the States of Holland, but also as leader of the delegation of Holland in the States General. Holland's potential as leader of the Union was therefore fully employed when De Witt gave direction to its policies. In other words, though formally only the "salaried official" (which is what pensionaris means) of one of the provinces, De Witt fulfilled in practice the leading role that previously had been fulfilled by the successive stadtholders of Holland. The stadtholder was truly not missed.

But this was not the only thing that changed. The constitutional conflict about the supremacy of the sovereignty of the Generality over provincial sovereignty, that seemed to be settled by the coup of William II, became "unsettled" again after his death. De Witt of course met opposition from other provinces from time to time, and sometimes Holland was even outvoted in the States General. This posed an unenviable dilemma for De Witt. Although decisions were supposed to be unanimous in the States General, this would in practice be unworkable. The principle of majority voting was therefore accepted by all provinces. On the other hand, Holland could not allow the other provinces to go against its wishes, as the major contributor to the Generality's budget. De Witt was therefore only prepared to accept a majority decision if Holland was in the majority. But how to justify this? The solution was to push the old doctrine of the supremacy of provincial sovereignty (as long as it was Holland's sovereignty), first formulated by François Vranck in 1587. And this became the basic constitutional theory of the Republic during the Stadtholderless Era, at least of De Witt's States Party.

For De Witt, the essence of what he later called the 'True Freedom', that is, republican government, was the sharing of power amongst those fitted by background, education, and training to exercise it, this dispersal of influence and the consultation, and compromise, that goes with it being the most effective mechanism for checking abuse and misgovernment.

Students of modern Dutch politics will recognize in this characterization of De Witt's statecraft the outlines of the venerable Dutch Polder Model.

== The First Anglo-Dutch War and the Act of Seclusion ==
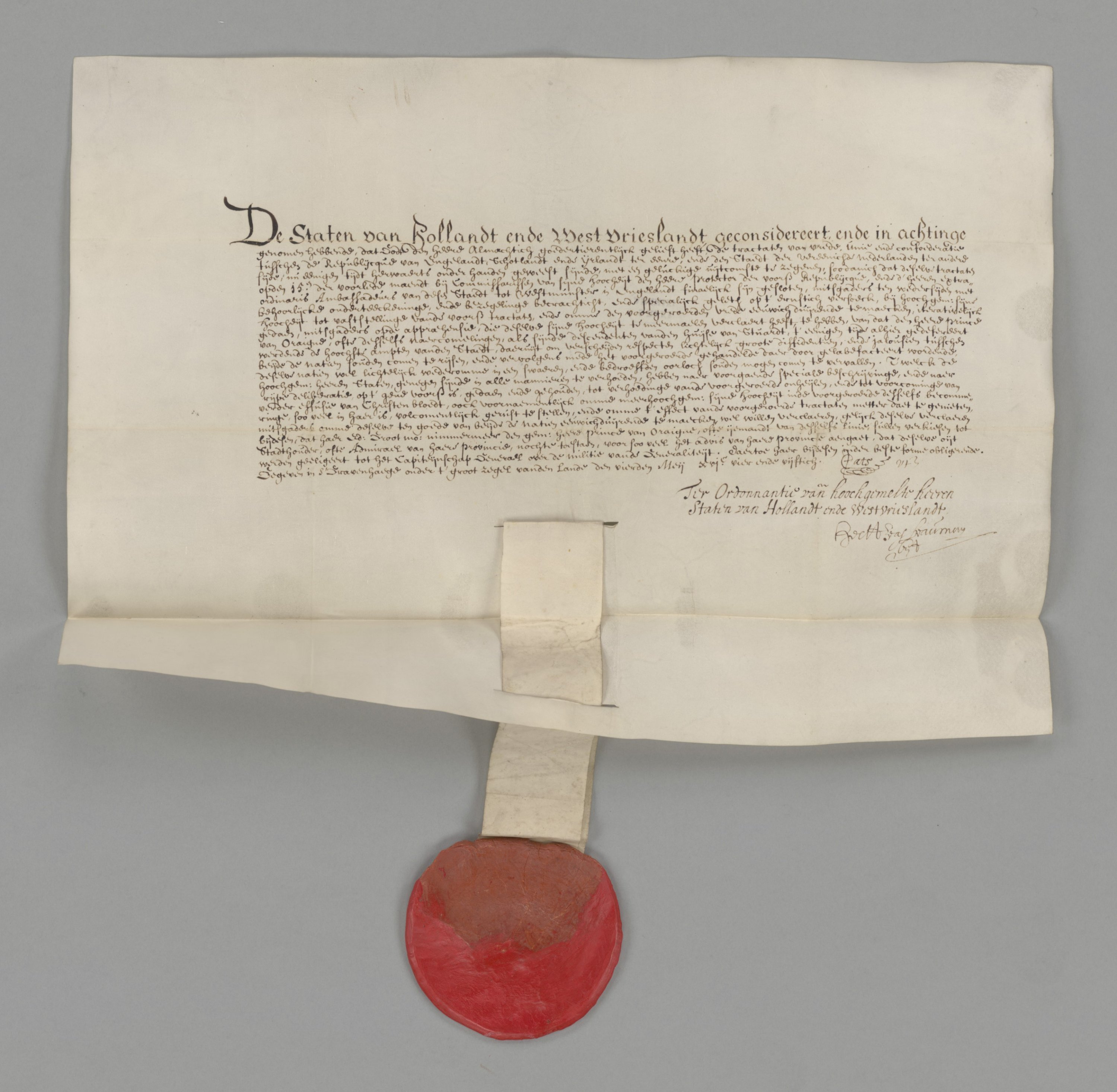
The Act of Seclusion

Due to certain strategic disadvantages of the Dutch and to a neglect of the Dutch navy after the end of the Eighty Years' War, the war went badly for the Dutch, at least in the theatre of war closest to both countries (elsewhere, the Dutch managed to achieve a strategic victory). The consequence was that Dutch economic interests were severely damaged; about 1200 ships were captured by the English; the herring fishery was paralyzed; Dutch Brazil was definitively lost to the Portuguese, because no reinforcements could be sent; a large part of the long-distance trade had to be suspended. Because of all this, the economy suffered a severe slump.

The ruling regent class was blamed for these losses by its Orangist opponents, especially the Frisian Stadtholder William Frederick. A veritable deluge of anonymous pamphlets excoriated the regime, and many Calvinist preachers tried to foment public unrest against the regents. This intimidated the States Party in the province of Zeeland sufficiently, bringing it to the brink of submitting to the demand that the three-year-old Prince of Orange should be appointed stadtholder of Zeeland. Their backs had to be stiffened by a delegation of the States of Holland, in which De Witt (not yet Grand Pensionary) played a leading role. Other provinces were wavering also. But the danger the country was in also helped restrain the Orangists from doing their worst. For the moment, therefore, William Frederick did not achieve his objective.

The "republican system" of the States Party (faced with the pressure from the English without, and the Orangist Party within) was saved by the cohesion of Hollands regents (who now closed ranks), the dissension in the other provinces, and the vulnerability of the English to strategic attack anywhere outside the "Narrow Seas". As long as the Dutch were not definitively defeated, and were rebuilding their fleets, the English were forced to concentrate their own navy in home waters, so that they could not break the hold of the Dutch on sea-lanes farther away. As a consequence, English commerce was paralyzed to an even greater extent than Dutch commerce. Dutch ally Denmark closed the Sound to English shipping, aided by a Dutch blockade fleet, stopping all English trade with the Baltic. In the Mediterranean the English Levant fleet was trapped at Leghorn, and an English relief fleet was destroyed by admiral Johan van Galen in the Battle of Leghorn. In the East Indies the EIC was swept from the seas by the Dutch East India Company. Even in the North Sea Dutch privateers equaled the captures of their English colleagues.

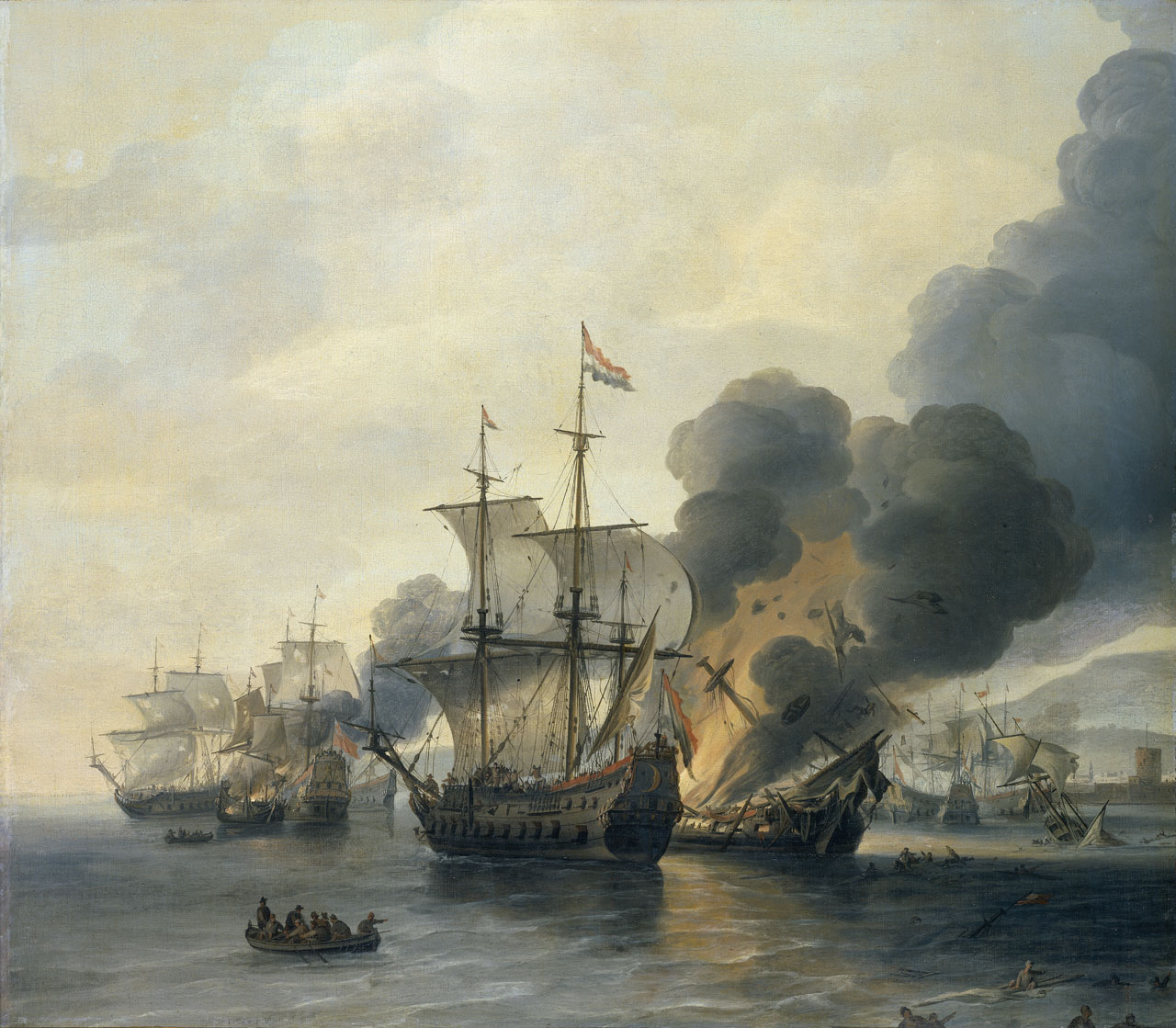
Battle of Leghorn, by Willem Hermansz van Diest

The Commonwealth and its leader Oliver Cromwell were therefore ready to come to terms by November 1653. While the war dragged on, and English economic losses mounted, the English dropped most of their demands. By the Spring of 1654 only the demand that the Republic should never again appoint a Prince of Orange (who also happened to be a grandson of Charles I of England) to high office, remained. This demand (which may very well have originated with the wily De Witt, though Cromwell later officially denied this) caused an uproar under the Orangists in the Republic. This was an obstacle to the peace both parties by now heartily yearned for, as the other provinces would never ratify it. De Witt broke this impasse by officially taking this item off the table (though it was non-negotiable to the English, ratification by Parliament depending on it), but secretly agreeing to the Act of Seclusion as a secret annexe to the official treaty. The trick here was that this Act would only bind the province of Holland. The States General ratified the treaty without the secret annexe, not knowing of its existence, and Parliament awaited ratification of the Act by the States of Holland, before itself ratifying the entire treaty. Only the two plenipotentiaries of the province of Holland (Hieronymus van Beverningh and Willem Nieupoort) knew of the ruse. The Frisian representative was left in the dark. The main "victims" of De Witt's duplicity were therefore his colleagues in the Dutch government.

To save the peace, De Witt first had to ram the Act through the States of Holland. Despite the opposition of a large minority of the voting cities he succeeded in getting the Act approved on 4 May 1654. Of course, this caused vehement argument among the Orangists in the province of Holland and elsewhere. Friesland in particular was outraged. The Delegated States of Friesland even went so far as to demand an inquiry by the States General into the conduct of the Dutch treaty negotiators. The other provinces were again too much internally divided, however, to offer a coherent opposition. Their paralysis prevented taking any action by the States General. Only Zeeland could have joined Friesland, but only uttered a verbal protest, because this province was well aware that an abrogation of the Act would mean an abrogation of the peace treaty, and Zeeland could not afford a resumption of the war.

The suspicion that De Witt was not unhappy with the Act was reinforced by the justification he had published (after having it adopted first by the States of Holland) in July 1654. In it he repeated the constitutional claims of the provincial-sovereignty doctrine as a justification for blocking young William's ascent to high office. He held that the Union of Utrecht was just an alliance of seven sovereign states, leaving each of those states free to make its own constitutional and political arrangements. Each could refrain from appointing anyone to any of its offices, and was not constrained to consider any particular person for any office, provincial or federal, or to refer to other provinces in these matters. He furthermore fulminated against the "hereditary principle" for filling offices, as experience in other republics (both in antiquity and in contemporary Italy) had proved this a "peril to freedom"..

Though De Witt had achieved a diplomatic triumph by making peace with England without making any concession to England's commercial, colonial, and maritime interests (and introducing the principle of arbitration into international treaties for the first time, as the Treaty of Westminster left a number of conflicts to be resolved by international arbitration) this came with a heavy political price. Holland reigned supreme within the Republic for the moment, and Holland's commerce was not really damaged by the fact that England maintained its Navigation Acts (England not being an essential market for the Amsterdam Entrepôt). But the resentment of the Orangists, especially at being outsmarted, would later exact a heavy price.

== Commercial primacy ==
The main cause for the war with the Commonwealth had been English resentment against the rapid inroads the Dutch made after the Peace of Münster on the English trade with the Iberian peninsula, the Mediterranean and the Levant. During the resumption of the war with Spain between 1621 and 1647 the latter had instituted an effective trade embargo against the Dutch. Not only were Spanish and Portuguese ports closed to Dutch shipping, but Spain also was very successful in hindering Dutch trade in neutral bottoms, like Hanseatic ships, chartered at exorbitant rates by Dutch merchants. In 1624 a special inspectorate, the Almirantazgo was instituted to suppress this kind of "contraband" trade, that efficiently intercepted such shipments. This partial disruption of direct trade with the Iberian lands made Dutch trade in the Mediterranean more difficult, because during the Twelve Year Truce the Dutch had captured a large slice of the trade in Spanish exports (wool, bullion) with Italy, which they lost after 1621. Most of this trade had been taken over by the English after the end of the Anglo-Spanish war in 1630, after which Spain and England cooperated amicably, including in the enforcement of the Spanish embargo on Dutch cargoes.

More importantly, the depredations of the Dunkirk privateers on Dutch shipping caused maritime insurance premiums for Dutch voyages to rise appreciably, also in trade that was not related to Southern Europe. This partly negated the Dutch competitive advantage in shipping rates, helping other European nations to overcome the disadvantage of the higher rates they had to charge because of their inefficiency. The Dutch would normally be able to charge far lower rates, because they needed far smaller crews to man their more efficient ships.

All this changed after the embargo was lifted in 1647 (during the final peace negotiations). Dutch trade to Spain and Portugal, Italy and the Levant not only immediately rebounded to prewar levels, aided by the way the Spanish authorities facilitated the resumption of trade, but Dutch shipping rates and insurance premiums also fell to permanently lower levels. This stimulated Dutch carrying trade in the rest of Europe, causing a fundamental restructuring of Dutch trade in the years 1647–51 that went at the expense of the Republic's commercial rivals, especially (but not exclusively) England.

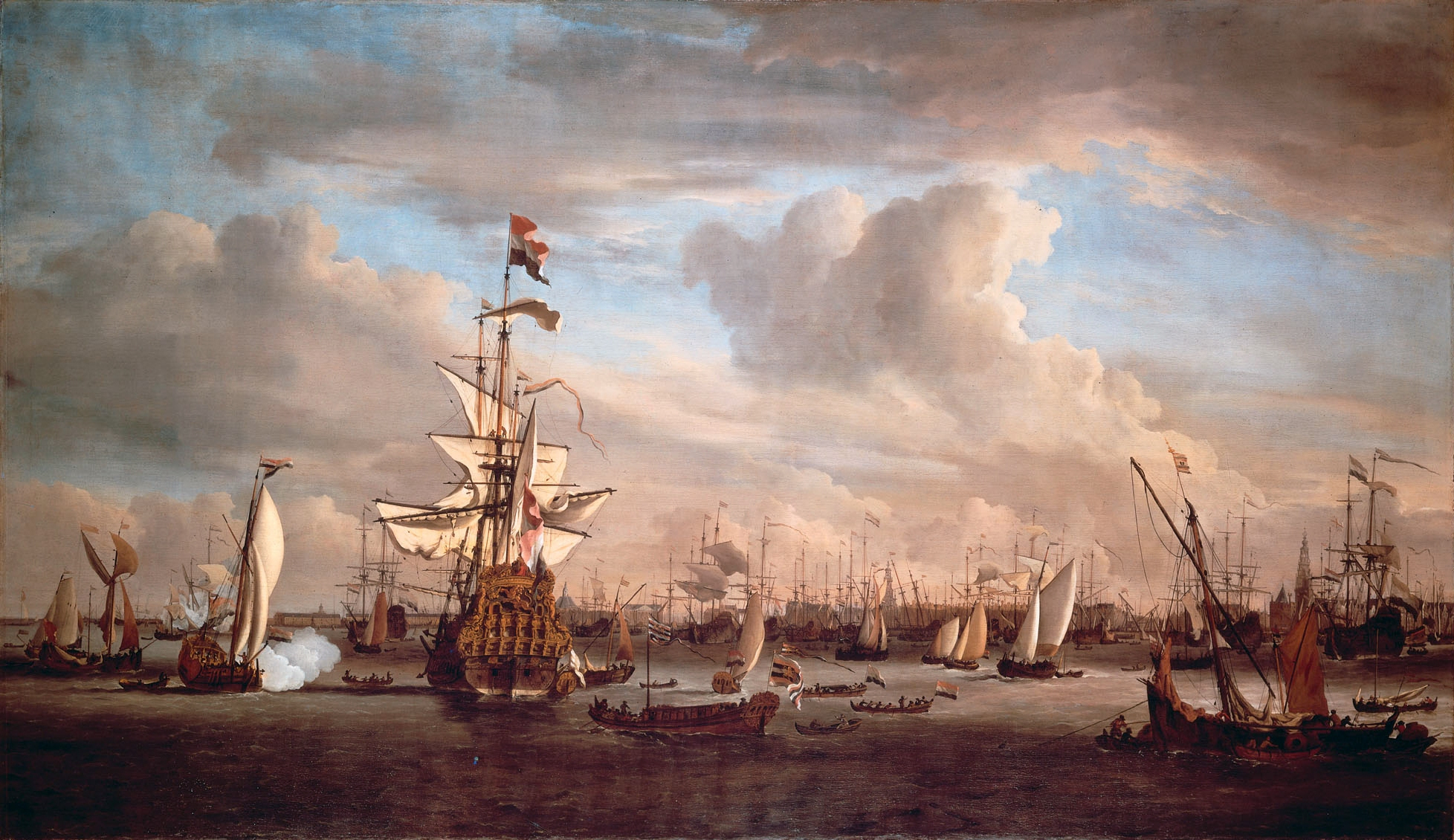
Harbour of Amsterdam by Willem van de Velde (1686)

England could no longer compete in the carrying trade to Spain and Portugal; the Dover entrepot that had competed successfully with the Amsterdam one in the 1640s as far as the Mediterranean was concerned, completely collapsed; the transmission of silver to Flanders was switched by the Spanish bankers to Amsterdam from London. But England lost not just the carrying trade. Far more important was that the ascendancy of English textile exports to Spain was now lost, that had been total in the 1640s, as had been the English role in Spanish wool exports. Within a year or two this was completely reversed by the Dutch who in 1650 handled 80 percent of this trade. Dutch lakens and camlets took over the Spanish textile market, whereas Holland also took over the entrepot for Ibero-American dyestuffs.

These gains were not just a matter of renewed access on favorable terms to the Iberian market, or greater efficiency. Equally important were other commercial advantages the Dutch had over their competitors, like fundamentally lower interest rates, and the productivity and profitably of the Dutch textile industry (due to technological innovations). The combination of these factors enticed Iberian wool exporters to opt for the Dutch market, and allowed Dutch merchants to pre-finance Spanish dyestuff exports (like they also pre-financed Baltic grain exports and French wine exports).

These changes had also ramifications in other theatres of trade, like the Baltic and the Levant, because the access of Dutch weavers to high-quality Spanish wool made Dutch textiles more attractive in the Baltic and the Levant than the previously ascendant English textiles. The consequence was a disastrous slump in the English textile industry after 1648. As the English were more dependent in their trade with the Baltic and Russia on their textile exports, their share in these trades therefore also declined.

Likewise, the English had dominated the trade in spices and textiles with Italy and Turkey. England consumed most of the olive oil and currants exported from those lands. However, after 1648 here too occurred a complete reversal in favor of the Dutch. The Genoese shifted their purchases to the Dutch entrepot and started to use Dutch shipping for their carrying trade predominantly. This was mostly due to the far-lower shipping rates the Dutch charged. But other factors in the sudden rise of the share the Dutch obtained in the intra-Mediterranean trade were the grip they obtained on the trade in Spanish bullion (often reminted as Dutch trade coins of high quality) to the Levant, and the progress the Dutch fine-cloth industry made with their products that were of a higher quality than the English. As a result, the English were thrown on the defensive in this area, too. To add insult to injury more and more imports that had reached England directly before, were from now on re-exported from the Amsterdam entrepot in Dutch ships.

The sudden Dutch ascendancy also extended to the Americas, and especially the Caribbean. During the war with Spain, the Dutch had been successfully excluded from Spanish America. However, after the peace (though the Spanish still managed to boycott Dutch trade in the colonies effectively) the Dutch resumed their trade with certain colonies, like Puerto Rico, that they had already had a lively contraband trade with. Such a trade now also flared up with the English colonies that still were in Royalist hands in the early 1650s, particularly Barbados and Surinam. The sugar trade with these colonies for a large part compensated for the loss of the sugar production after the loss of Dutch Brazil in 1645. This disaster for the Dutch caused a spike in European sugar prices. But this had as a positive result that sugar production in French and English Caribbean islands was now stimulated, often with Dutch investment. The Dutch were, of course, happy to buy the sugar and provide the necessary slaves from their trading forts in West Africa.

Of course, the English were not the only "victims". The French, Scandinavian, and North-German merchants were also hit hard by the sudden resurgence of the Dutch in world markets. But the English were especially hit hard. This caused tremendous resentment, also because the English were not inclined to seek the fault with themselves, but suspected the Dutch of conspiring to engross world trade with means that could not be other than foul. However, this may be, the Commonwealth felt they could not take this Dutch "insolence" lying down. Unfortunately, unlike the Scandinavians and the Hanseatics, they were in a military position to do something about it. The Commonwealth government first tried peaceful means, like a haughty attempt to renew the English protectorate from Elizabethan and Jacobean days (based on the Treaty of Nonsuch) over the Republic, but this was politely rejected. Then Parliament passed the Navigation Act, which was intended to break the hold of the Dutch entrepot by prohibiting its re-exports to English markets, and also reserving the carrying trade to and from England to English bottoms. Of course, these blatantly protectionist measures most of all hurt the English economy and that of the English colonies. After all, the Dutch did not hold a pistol to the heads of their customers, but had achieved their ascendancy by offering better deals. English importers and consumers were now deprived of these benefits.

Though a setback, these protectionist measures were not as devastating to the Dutch trade system as the English had intended. The English market in itself was not very important to the Dutch, compared to the French, Iberian, and American markets. The Commonwealth' writ did not yet run in the latter, so these markets were not immediately lost. The fact that England was able to continue this protectionist policy after the First Anglo-Dutch War had ended, was therefore not a severe blow to the Dutch. The damage from the war itself was severe for a while, but English commercial interests were damaged at least at much, if not more. The Dutch trade primacy was therefore not permanently damaged by the war, and neither did the English manage to regain their prewar position with force of arms. The only major consequence of the English policy was, that it gave ideas to first the Scandinavians, and later the French about the possibilities to use military and protectionist means, that later caused great difficulties to the Republic.

Such problems started in the Baltic, where Denmark and Sweden in turn took steps that for a while damaged Dutch trade interests. The Dutch managed to counter these measures by military and diplomatic means, rolling back Danish increases of the Sound toll in 1649, and forcing the Swedes to retract mercantilist measures in the 1650s, but still the 1650s were a time of decline in the Dutch Baltic carrying trade, though this decline should not be exaggerated, as is often done. Before 1650 the Dutch had a share of 70 percent of total shipping movements; after 1650 this declined to 60 percent.

In the Mediterranean a kind of division of labor between the English and Dutch came into being after the war: the English were the main customers for olive oil and currants, and the Navigation Act therefore helped them to monopolize this trade. On the other hand, the Dutch monopolized the trade in spices and fine-cloth (the English being left with the trade in lower-value textiles). The English were the major buyers of Italian raw silk, whereas this trade was for the Dutch marginal in comparison with their Asian and Persian silk trade. Generally, the Dutch had a favorable balance of trade with this area (and the English a negative one), because the Dutch dominated more trades (like that in Baltic naval stores and salt) and more profitable ones. As a matter of fact, the total value of the Mediterranean and Levant trade to the Dutch was about equal to that of the Far-Eastern trade of the VOC, both bringing in about 20 million guilders annually.

The fact that both France and England were at war with Spain between 1655 and 1659 (the French since 1635) helped reserve the Spanish trade to the Dutch in this period, as the Spanish embargo now was aimed at these competitors. When France was at peace with Spain, however, this country tended to dominate the Spanish trade, due to the strength of its linen exports both to Spain and its colonies. Though this influence may be exaggerated also: the French at this time had practically no part in the carrying trade, and the Dutch dominated the export of Spain's main export, raw wool. For political reasons (Portugal was at war with the Dutch in the same period over the aftermath of the reconquest of Dutch Brazil) the English predominated in the Portuguese trade. The Dutch dominated the salt trade with Portugal, however, also because the 1661 peace treaty stipulated that the war indemnity imposed on Portugal to compensate the WIC for the loss of Brazil, would be paid in that commodity. This was important, because Portuguese salt was better suited than high-magnesium French salt for the preservation of herring.

The dominance of the Dutch in the Far East also reached its zenith in these years, though not everything went the way of the VOC. The lucrative China-Japan trade, which the company had managed to monopolize for a while came to an end as the new Qing-regime finally managed to tighten its grip on the last remnants of the Ming in South China, and first reverse the terms of trade with the Dutch, before eventually completely closing the Chinese market to them. The VOC forts on Taiwan were lost to an adherent of the Ming, Koxinga, who in a move foreshadowing Chiang Kai-shek's flight to Taiwan in 1949, tried to make that island his base, but these forts had been mostly important in the silk trade with Japan, and that trade was now being taken over by the Chinese themselves anyway. The Japan trade lost most of its importance for the VOC, when in 1668 the shōgun embargoed the export of silver, which the VOC had been using to finance most of its spice trade with. But because Spanish bullion was now again easily obtainable for the Dutch, this did not cramp the style of the VOC too much.

On a more positive note for the Dutch, the war with Portugal over compensation of the sister-company, the WIC, for her losses in Brazil to Portuguese insurgents, now provided the VOC with a convenient pretext to do away with the last remnants of the Portuguese trading empire in Ceylon and the Malabar and Coromandel coasts of India. Portuguese forts in these areas were conquered all the way to Goa; the local rulers were pressed to sign "exclusive-marketing contracts" with the VOC, conveniently excluding the English and Danes at the same time; and the VOC obtained the monopolies on Ceylonese cinnamon and elephants (useful in the trade with India).

The Anglo-Dutch conflicts were useful for the VOC for driving out its competitors, the EIC, from the Indonesian archipelago, by force of arms. In 1665 first the only English factory in the Spice Islands, Pulo Run was definitively conquered, excluding the English from the clove trade. More importantly, the VOC subsequently conquered the sultanates in Makassar, Jambi, and Palembang, forcing the sultans to exclude the English and Danes (who had previously maintained factories there) from the pepper trade.

Though the end of the war with Spain in 1648 enabled the VOC to greatly expand its empire by military means, and to hold European competitors at bay in the same manner (a fortress was built at the strategic Cape of Good Hope in 1653), it did not completely rely on force of arms for its commercial dominance. In Bengal, and the intra-Indian trade, for instance, the Dutch dominated at first by commercial means, consistently out-trading the English in commodities such as silk, rice, and opium, destined for other Asian markets. In these years the scale of the Dutch intra-Asian trade went unrivalled.

This worldwide primacy in trade would not have been possible if it only rested on Dutch primacy in the carrying trade. After all, one has to trade something. Even where the counterparty is primarily interested in gold and silver as means of exchange, as in South-East Asia, that specie must be earned by a surplus on the balance of payments with other trading partners. A surplus in "invisibles", like shipping services, would not suffice to cover the enormous financing requirement of the spice trade. At first, the Dutch had little indigenous to offer, beyond herring and dairy products. But the industrial revolution of the early 17th century brought an industry into being that by the 1640s had matured enough to play an important part in Dutch exports. This industrial growth was partly innovation driven, stimulating all kinds of heretofore not seen mechanization, that greatly enhanced labor productivity, thereby driving down prices for Dutch products, even while nominal wages rose steeply at the same time. But the commerce-engendered Dutch control of many raw-material markets (like Spanish and Turkish raw wool, Swedish iron and copper, Ibero-American dyestuffs, Portuguese salt, French wine, Baltic grain, Scandinavian tar and wood, Caribbean sugar, American tobacco etc.) was an important factor in stimulating the booms of the industries that used those materials: textiles, guns, vinegar, shipbuilding, sugar and salt refining, tobacco blending, to name only a few. The Dutch entrepot was therefore supplied by an important domestic industrial sector, and not limited to reexporting wares obtained abroad. Industry and commerce were in this period closely integrated (though in later stages of the Dutch economy they would become disaggregated again, when foreign protection and a structurally high real-wage level forced the decline of the Dutch industrial sector).

An important factor in this industrial boom (as in the development of the fisheries) was, remarkably, the regulating role of the Dutch government: guaranteeing product quality gave Dutch products a reputation in foreign markets, that justified slightly higher prices, if need be. Other forms of market regulation, like the monopolies given to the VOC and WIC, but also the semi-official industry bodies that regulated the trade on Russia and the Levant, and the herring industry, helped stabilize market fluctuations. Patent protection helped stimulate industrial innovation. The sophisticated Dutch capital market was stabilized by regulated institutions like the Amsterdam Bank and Exchange, and the regulator of the insurance market. And maybe most importantly, the close connection of the Dutch regents to commercial interests in this period helped shield Dutch industry and commerce from excessive taxation or tariffs. Also, the Dutch government did not hesitate to put its not inconsiderable diplomatic and military might behind Dutch commercial interests, if the need arose to protect them against foreign protectionist measures.

== Diplomatic supremacy ==
Though the Republic was only a small country, with a small population (about two million inhabitants when England had five million, and France already 20 million), these strategic drawbacks were more than compensated for by the economic and financial might of the Republic. Uniquely in Europe in this age, the Dutch state was able to tap the already sophisticated Dutch capital market, without having to go through banking intermediaries, to finance emergency military spending by borrowing. At the same time the taxing capacity was sufficient to service the still-manageable public debt this engendered. In case of need, the Republic could therefore rapidly expand its standing army by hiring mercenaries in "congenial" markets, like Scotland, the Protestant Swiss Cantons, and sundry Protestant German principalities, foremost Prussia. This was most spectacularly demonstrated in the months leading up to the Dutch invasion of England in 1688, when the standing army was simply doubled in size by hiring Prussian troops. But it also applied during most of the period under consideration (though it failed miserably in 1672, as we will see).

However, in this period military threats did not come primarily from the land side, so there was little need for a large standing army, as there had been during the war with Spain. The Spanish Army of Flanders, with 70,000 men one of the largest standing armies in Europe at the time, was fully engaged in defending the Southern Netherlands against France up to the Peace of the Pyrenees in 1659. Spain would never again be a threat to the Republic from this quarter, actually hoping to conclude a defensive alliance against France. Though the Republic in these first years after the war with Spain was loath "to shore up a neighboring ruin" as De Witt remarked to the Spanish ambassador, the latter's reply that he would be wise to do so, "if he didn't want that ruin to fall on his head", later proved all too true. From 1667 on, the Republic was continually engaged in chasing the French out of the Spanish lands, and probably could have taken the Spanish Netherlands for itself, any time it wanted, but it preferred the Spanish Netherlands as a buffer state.

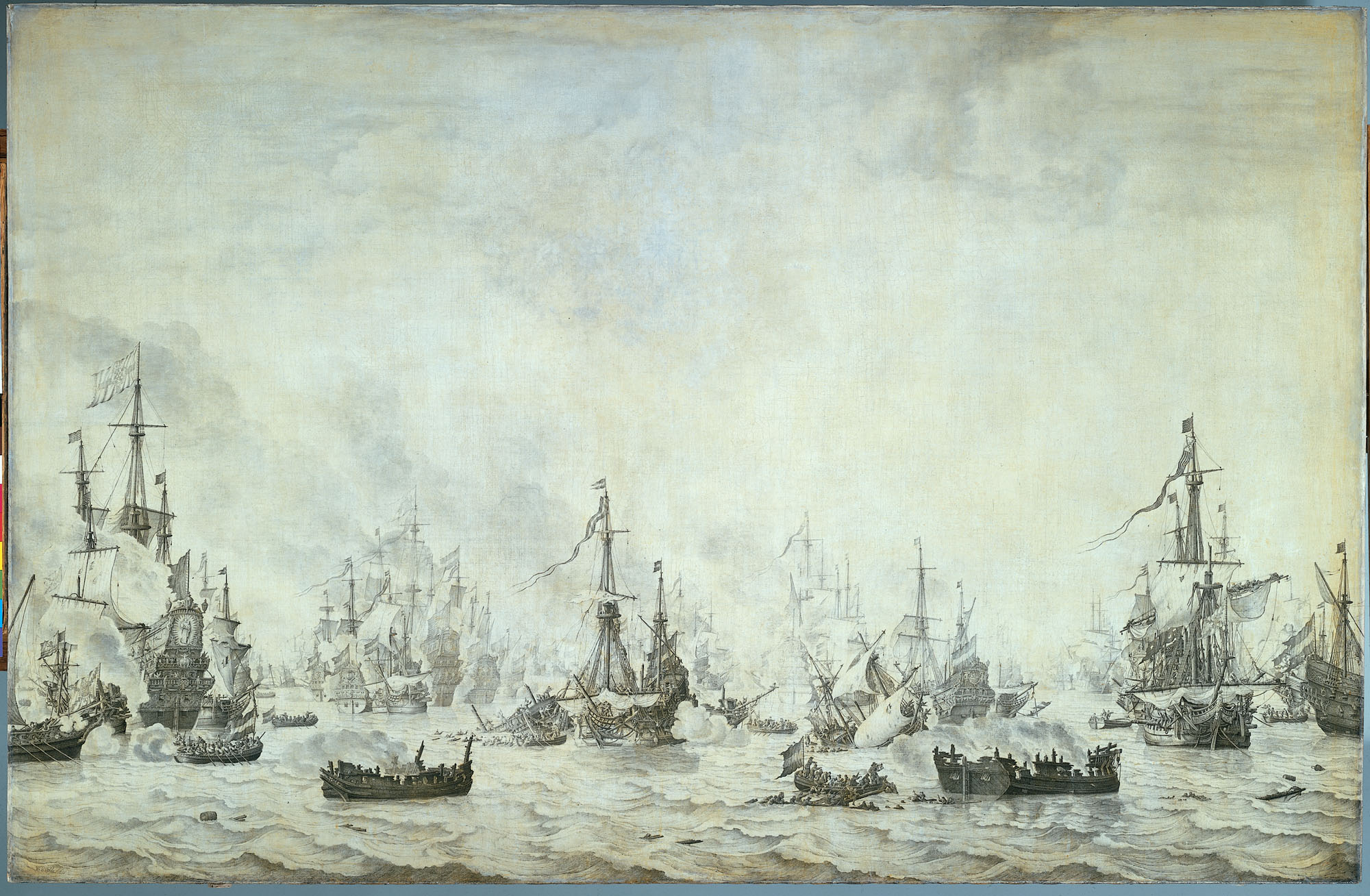
The Battle of the Downs (1639) by Willem van de Velde, 1659. Rijksmuseum.

After the conflict with William II over the size of the army, which ended at his premature death, the now victorious regents lost little time in further reducing the size of the army. Unfortunately, they displayed the same parsimony to the navy, allowing the independent admiralties to sell off a large part of the fleet that had defeated the second Spanish Armada so resoundingly in neutral English waters in the Battle of the Downs of 1639. The foolishness of this policy was amply demonstrated in the First Anglo-Dutch War, when at least initially the Dutch navy did not stand a chance against the English fleet, at least in home waters, due to its qualitative and quantitative inferiority. While the war was still raging, the De-Witt regime therefore embarked on an ambitious program of naval construction and naval reform. The "new navy" was born that would become the pre-eminent instrument to project Dutch power abroad. The main innovation was that now sixty captains would be permanently employed by the navy, greatly increasing its professionalism. Due to the shallowness of Dutch home waters the size of the largest Dutch ships could still not be equal to that of the English first-rates, but the gap in weight of guns was narrowed.

This new navy would only be truly tested in the Second Anglo-Dutch War, as England was the Republic's only naval rival in these years, and neither country was keen to test the other so soon after the first war, that had been so costly to both sides. Besides, the Commonwealth was soon embroiled in a war with Spain, joining the Franco-Spanish War (1635-1659) on the French side, in which the Republic remained neutral, content to reap the commercial benefits from the new-won Spanish friendship. However, the new navy proved useful in the smaller conflicts in which the Republic became soon engaged in Scandinavia and Portugal.

Due to the importance of the Dutch Baltic trade for Amsterdam and the northern Holland port cities, the Dutch were always keenly interested in what happened around the Sound. Already in the 1640s the Republic had intervened in the Torstenson War of king Christian IV of Denmark with Sweden, putting its thumb in the scales, both by military intervention in favor of the Swedes, and by favoring that country in the subsequent peace mediation that resulted in the Treaty of Brömsebro. Denmark had made itself unpopular in Dutch eyes by siding with Spain in the war and by unilaterally increasing the toll on Dutch shipping. At first there was little the Dutch could do, but when Christian provoked the Swedes to invade Jutland in 1643, the Dutch applauded, but did little more than offer diplomatic support, because the Zeeland and Rotterdam interests were loath to spend good money to defend the Amsterdam interests (the Orangists still being in the ascendant in this period). When the Swedes in consequence showed little enthusiasm to help lower tolls for the Dutch in the peace negotiations of 1644, the States General were finally forced to put their money where their mouth was. A Dutch fleet of 48 warships was assembled that, in July 1645, escorted three hundred Dutch merchant vessels through the Sound, making a show of not paying any toll at all. The Danish monarch watched the imposing spectacle in person from the ramparts of the castle of Helsingør, being politely saluted by the Dutch. The king made no response. A few months later a treaty was signed with the Dutch that formed the basis for their commercial ascendancy throughout the 17th century in the Baltic trade. Tolls for the Dutch were lowered; Dutch shipping would be exempt from visitation by Danish officials; Dutch shipping would be totally exempt from the toll at Glückstadt.

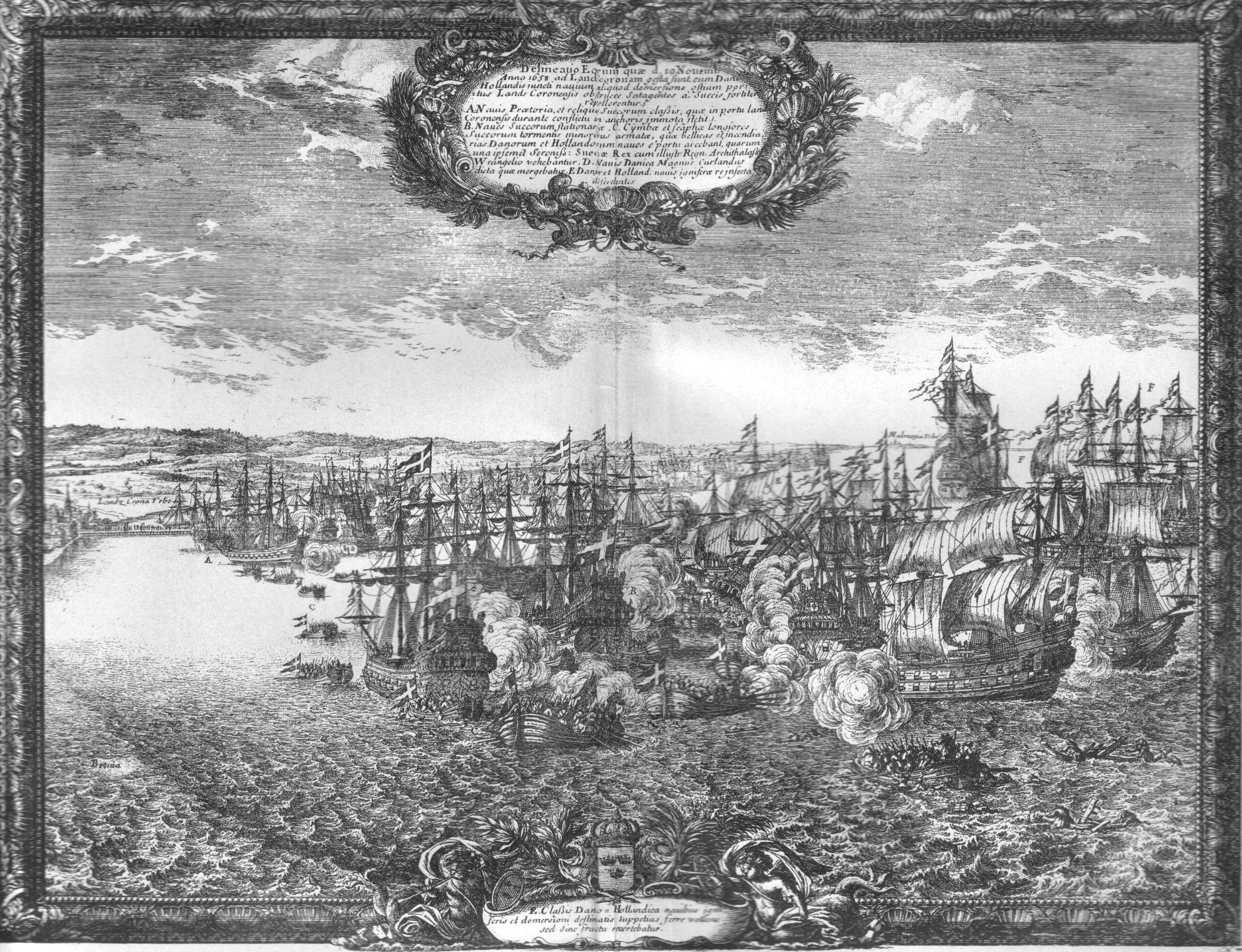
Battle of the Sound by Samuel von Pufendorf

But soon the Dutch would have occasion to come to the aid of the Danes in a conflict with Sweden. In 1654 Charles X Gustav of Sweden ascended the Swedish throne and he embarked on an aggressive policy, in the process harming Dutch interests in several ways. He blockaded the port of Danzig during the Polish part of the Northern Wars, hindering Dutch commerce. In July 1656 Cornelis de Graeff sent a fleet under Jacob van Wassenaer Obdam of the new Dutch navy. The fleet was dispatched to Danzig which helped persuade the Swedes to lift this blockade. Obdam was the commander-in-chief of the Dutch navy in these years, a political appointment by De Witt, who preferred an officer of the right political color to be in charge, in preference to more competent, but politically undesirable Orangists, when Witte Corneliszoon de With and Michiel de Ruyter (both States-Party men) were unavailable for different reasons. As Obdam was basically a landlubber, this was not an ideal solution, but in this context he proved up to the job.

Unfortunately, the Danish king Frederick III of Denmark (who had been a staunch ally of the Dutch in the war with the Commonwealth, despite his father's humiliation in 1645), now declared war on Charles. Charles proved himself to be an astute military tactician by soon overrunning the Danish isles, threatening to dominate both sides of the Sound. This the Dutch could not allow, and (though Zeeland and the South Holland regents again at first obstructed action, because they myopically did not see the Dutch interest in intervention) Obdam was again dispatched with a fleet to the scene of the crime. This time he defeated the Swedes in the Battle of the Sound and relieved besieged Copenhagen.

The English now decided that the Dutch had gone too far, and intervened in their turn by sending a fleet to oppose the Dutch, and shore up Swedish determination. Reluctantly (because they did not relish another hot war with the Commonwealth) the States General called this bluff, by sending a second fleet, under the command of De Ruyter, in the Summer of 1659. The combined Dutch fleets, 78 ships and 17,000 men, anchored provocatively in the Sound close to the combined Anglo-Swedish fleet. After some brooding staring from both sides, the English decided to go home again. The Dutch then proceeded by ejecting the Swedes from Nyborg, making the Swedish position untenable. Charles now sued for peace. He agreed to give up his conquests in Denmark, and to retract a number of protectionist measures against Dutch shipping.

The Dutch had thus in fact imposed a pax neerlandica on the Baltic region. They leaned then to the Danes, then to the Swedes, but never forgot Dutch interests in the process. This was, of course, highly resented by all parties involved, not least the English, and also France, which now began to revive from its weak diplomatic position during the minority of Louis XIV and the subsequent ministry of Cardinal Mazarin. During the early 1660s English diplomats were highly successful in fomenting all kinds of trouble for the Dutch in Copenhagen and Stockholm. Denmark, in particular, seemed amenable to a reversal of alliances in the events leading up to the Second Anglo-Dutch War. However, when that war broke out, the Danes decided that they simply could not afford to go against Dutch wishes, and they again sided with the Republic by closing the Sound to English commerce.

The point here is that the Dutch did not have to press the Danes by obvious military means; diplomacy sufficed. The English envoy to Denmark, Sir Gilbert Talbot, regretfully remarked (quoting the reply of the Danish government to his protest):

Swede lyeth remote and out of danger, but he [the Danish king] is exposed soe much to the mercy of the Hollanders that if they appear with twenty fregates in the Sound, they may block up all provisions for this towne [Copenhagen]. To this they addith that all his subjects are ruined if theyr commerce be obstructed with Holland, for in that case noe part of his dominions can afford him anything; his woods and other commoditiyes of Norway and corn and cattle in Zealand, Funen, and Holstein will all lye dead upon his hands, which is not the case of the Swede, theyr commodities being such as Holland can have from none but themselves.

Dutch economic might was sufficient to sway not just the Danes, but other European powers also. The Dutch economic primacy might be resented, but most Europeans preferred it to that of the English and French, as the Dutch lacked the manpower and political ambition to translate their economic might into political domination. In this case of the 1665 war with England, Sweden, which usually opposed Denmark, also calculated that it was better off with a Dutch win. This applied all over Europe (except in Portugal, that was still hurting from the recent war with the Republic). Hamburg (a keen competitor of the Dutch) helped the Dutch stop the supply of naval stores to England and provided the "neutral" ships to carry Dutch trade through the English blockade. In Italy, public opinion showed itself quite pro-Dutch after the Four Days Battle of June 1666, which ended arguably in a draw, but was claimed by the propagandists of both sides as a victory. In Leghorn the dock-workers rioted against the English, and the English flag was run up on the steeple of the main basilica upside down under the Dutch flag. Spain allowed Dutch privateers to auction English prizes at Corunna.

The Dutch States-Party regents were no pacifists. When Portugal refused to make amends for its reconquest of the colonies in Africa (Angola) and America (Dutch Brazil) from the WIC in 1648, the shareholders of that company who were heavily represented in Zeeland and in the land provinces (Overijssel and Guelders), convinced the States General to declare war on Portugal in 1657 (though the company had expressly been given sovereign powers to take care of its own affairs). Though this stretched Dutch naval resources rather thin, just at the time the business with Sweden in the Sound had to be dealt with, the Dutch blockaded Lisbon for a while, and Dutch privateers hampered Portuguese shipping. The Dutch did most of their damage in Ceylon and India, however, as we have seen above. These Dutch successes stimulated England (that had been sabotaging the Luso-Dutch peace negotiations, because the war helped reserve Portuguese trade to themselves) to drop their objections to the Treaty of The Hague (1661). In this treaty, De Witt's conviction that trade was more important than colonial possessions, and that the war had been a mistake, got the upper hand. The Republic dropped its demands for restitution of the lost colonies in exchange for a handsome indemnity. But the damage to Luso-Dutch relations had already been done, and the Republic was never again able to replace England in Portuguese trade.

The example of the relations with Portugal illustrated that De Witt's diplomatic gifts were necessary as much within the Republic, as without. He always had to make internal deals to accompany the external deals he made with foreign powers. In the case of the Hague treaty, Zeeland at first refused to ratify (and the requirement of unanimity in cases of peace and war in the Union of Utrecht made its position strong). De Witt persuaded the Zeeland States to acquiesce by giving the Zeeland salt-refiners the best part of the business of refining the salt that Portugal paid as its indemnity.

But bribery played a big part in foreign relations also. A good example is the Dutch Gift the States General gave to Charles II of England in 1660 to get back in his good graces after the coolness of the mutual relations that reigned during Charles's years of exile in France. The bribe consisted of a number of precious paintings worth the not inconsiderable sum of 80,000 guilders, and the yacht HMY Mary, like the yacht on which he was comfortably transported home to England during the Restoration. The gift was mostly paid for by the Amsterdam vroedschap, who came to regret their unaccustomed generosity when Charles unfolded his anti-Dutch policy. Fortunately, most of the paintings were repatriated to the Netherlands by William III of England after he had become king, so the financial outlay had not been a complete waste.

Usually generous gifts had their intended effects, however. During the stadtholderate Dutch officials in their turn had been the happy recipients of diplomatic largesse themselves. However, the De Witt regime was unusually impervious to corruption itself, as the French ambassador complained in 1653, because the power was so diffused that one did no longer know whom to bribe, with the consequence that "...cette dépense serait infinie et infructueuse."

== The "True Freedom" ==
That dispersion of power, though seen by many, then and later, as a major weakness of the Republic, was actually the foundation stone of De Witt's political system, that he called de Ware Vrijheid (the "True Freedom"). We have already seen that De Witt primarily defended Oldenbarnevelt's and Grotius' claim to supremacy of (Holland's) provincial sovereignty over the sovereignty of the Generality under this moniker. But the doctrine went further. "True Freedom" implied the rejection of an "eminent head", not only of the federal state (where it would have conflicted with provincial sovereignty), but also of the provincial political system. De Witt considered Princes and Potentates as such, as detrimental to the public good, because of their inherent tendency to waste tax payer's money on military adventures in search of glory and useless territorial aggrandizement. As the province of Holland only abutted friendly territory, the Holland regents had no territorial designs themselves, and they looked askance at such designs by the other provinces, because they knew they were likely to have to foot the bill anyway. The Republic therefore from time to time threw its weight around in the German principalities to the East, but always to protect strategic interests, not for territorial gain. Likewise, after the dispute over the Overmaas territory (which still had been left over from the Munster treaty) was settled with the partition treaty of 1661 with Spain, there were no further territorial claims in the Southern Netherlands, till after the War of Spanish Succession fundamentally changed the strategic situation.

The rejection of the dynastic claims of the House of Orange therefore was not just a matter of defending the political patronage of one particular political faction, against the aspirations to lucrative political office of another faction. It was a matter of principle to the States Party: they were against the notion of any "eminent head" of the Dutch state, not just the Prince of Orange. The absence of such an "eminent head" was to them a mark of superiority of the Dutch political system over other forms of government. The fact that compromise was a constant feature of the Dutch political landscape, and that often the pace of decision-making was glacial, was also viewed in a not necessarily negative light. (Besides, as was abundantly proved during the reign of William III, when he had obtained the stadtholdership after 1672, an "eminent head" did not necessarily eliminate the need for compromise, or speed up decision-making). Like his contemporaries as statesmen, such as Mazarin, De Witt was a raison d'état statesman, but his raison d'état had a different content. Unlike the princely version, his disdained territorial aggrandizement, military capability for its own sake, and concentration of power in the central state. Instead, he strove to ensure security of the Dutch state, its independence from outside interference, and advancement of its trade and industry, all elements being intended to benefit the society of which the regent class were the proper representatives. The Republic, in De Witt's view, sought to attain goals which were commensurate with the interests of its citizens, not in conflict with them, as the goals of absolutist rulers often were.

Needless to say, the Orangist party saw things differently. Their adherence to the Prince of Orange's dynastic interest was partly a matter of personal advancement, as many Orangist regents resented being ousted from the offices they had monopolized under the Stadtholderate. But many people also had a genuine ideological attachment to the "monarchical" principle. Calvinism felt theological unease with a political system that did not have a Prince at its head, as such a system did not seem to be justifiable in biblical terms (at least if one overlooked the Book of Judges in preference to Books of Kings). As the analogy of the Dutch Republic with the biblical People of Israel was never far from people's minds, this helped to give an important underpinning for the Orangist claims in the mind of the common people, who were greatly influenced from the pulpit. Of course, the Public Church thought its interests best served by the Stadtholder, as the Erastianism of the Holland regents was seen as a constant threat to its independence. An example of what this threat might entail was the controversy about the formulary the States of Holland imposed in 1663 for prayers in favor of the government. Such prayers were said as a matter of routine in Dutch Reformed churches throughout the life of the Republic; it was an uncontested obligation following from its status as the Public Church. The problem in the view of the Holland regents, however, was first that the "wrong" sequence was observed: the States General were given precedence over the provincial states, and secondly that prayers were also said for that "private citizen", the Prince of Orange. The States therefore now prescribed that prayers for the States General should be said last, and those for the States of Holland first, and that the Prince of Orange (13 years at the time) should be omitted. Though this formulary only applied to the province of Holland, and the clergy (mindful of their livings) complied with discreetly gnashing teeth, the other provinces erupted in a furore. The States of Friesland took this opportunity to challenge the doctrine of provincial sovereignty head-on, and claimed that the formulary went contrary to the Acts of the Dort Synod, that had settled the church in 1619. Zeeland almost supported Friesland, but De Witt managed to get the Zeeland States (who always had to mind their volatile Calvinist base) to prevaricate.

This incident illustrates that in the Republic the relationship between Church and State always remained problematic, even though it had seemed to be settled in favor of the church in 1619. Though the regents knew better than to interfere in matters of doctrine (as they were accused of doing in 1618), they thought they had certain rights of oversight in return for the privileged status of the Reformed Church. The clergy, on the other hand, had never reconciled itself to such oversight, and on the contrary was of the opinion that the Church had a right to oversee public policy. As the regents would never concede such a right there was a constant tension between the two, not least in the matter of tolerance, or rather, Toleration.

The Union of Utrecht had guaranteed freedom of conscience, but this did not imply freedom of worship. Except for the Dutch Reformed Church, public worship by other denominations was usually restricted with more or less severity, and membership of the privileged church was supposed to be a prerequisite for holding public office (though this rule was often honored in the breach, even as far as Catholic office holders in the Generality Lands were concerned). This policy of supremacy of the Public Church was, however, never enforced consistently, either in the different parts of the country, or over time. In general, a policy of de facto toleration predominated, even when legal prohibitions were in force. This went against the grain of the Calvinist diehards, who constantly insisted on official suppression of competing faiths, going back to the Contra-Remonstrant controversy of 1618. Their Remonstrant opponents had come to defend religious toleration after their own suppression, and though Remonstrant regents had been ousted at the time, this political point of view remained in favor with the Holland regents, unlike their colleagues in most other provinces. The debate continued to flare up from time to time. The flap over the Holland public prayers was just one of many instances. What makes it interesting is that such debates were usually not over doctrinal matters, but in a sense about "public order". Also, they tended quickly to widen to debates over unsettled constitutional matters, like the provincial-supremacy claim of the Holland regents.

Because of this intermingling of matters that at first view would not seem to be directly related, one discerns a peculiar line-up in the ideological debate of the times, that is contrary to many myths that have arisen in later historiography. Though privately they might be as intolerant as any person, the Holland regents for political reasons were often in favor of religious toleration, and freedom of thought, because their political opponents were in alliance with the forces of religious intolerance in the Calvinist church. On the other hand, the Orangist faction often supported intolerance, because they craved the support of the preachers. As toleration did not have the favorable press it has in our times, this was actually a weak point in the armor of the De-Witt regime. There was a need for ideological justification of these policies against accusations of allowing abominations as "atheism" and "libertinism" from the side of the Consistory.

There was therefore a healthy public debate in the form of pamphlets published by both sides. Most of these have only an interest as curiosities, but some have exercised lasting influence, also outside the Republic. In the controversy about the Holland formulary a cousin and almost namesake of De Witt, Johan de Wit (with one t), published one pseudonymously in 1663–4, under the title Public Gebedt. This asserted that the form of government of the Republic (as preferred by the Holland regents) was the "most excellent" and chosen by God himself, while he quoted Tacitus to say that prayers for any but the sovereign power in public ceremonies weaken the state. This heavy tome would be unremarkable if it were not for the fact that De Witt is believed to have vetted the book himself, and thus given it his tacit imprimatur.

In the same way, De Witt is thought to have lent a hand in revising a major work by Pieter de la Court, published in 1662: Interest van Hollandt. The disparaging remarks about the stadtholderate in this work, which amounted to the assertion that princes (and by implication stadtholders) have an interest in keeping the world in perpetual conflict, because they wield more influence in such circumstances, incensed the Orangist public.

Another work by De la Court, Political Discourses caused even more of a furore. In it he denounces all (quasi-)monarchy as harming the true interest of the citizen (which he distinguishes from the subjects of monarchies), because hereditary power subordinates the public good to dynastic concerns. For good measure he added that it was necessary for the public good to curb the influence of the Public Church outside its proper sphere in the spiritual domain. This, of course, earned him the enmity of the leadership of his Leyden church that barred him from the Lord's Supper in retaliation.

This anticlericalism was not left unanswered. The leader of the conservative Calvinists, Gisbertus Voetius, published the first volume of his Politica Ecclesiastica in 1663, in which he attacked (in Latin) De Witt and the Erastian policies of the regents. Possibly by Voetius also, but in any case by someone close to him, was the Resurrected Barnevelt, in which the anonymous writer, writing in Dutch, attacked the provincial-supremacy doctrine and the prayer formulary as an insidious attempt to make the other six provinces subservient to Holland. To which possibly De Witt himself replied with a scalding pamphlet, entitled Schotschen Duyvel in which he denounced Voetius by name as a master-mutineer.

The great Dutch playwright Joost van den Vondel, a partisan of Oldenbarnevelt, reissued his play Palamedes that in a veiled way deplored the execution of Oldenbarnevelt, in these years (it had been suppressed under the Stadtholderate before 1650). It was performed in Rotterdam in 1663 and elicited a forgettable Orangist counterblast in the form of the tragedy Wilhem, of gequetste vryheit by the rector of the Dordrecht Latin school, Lambert van de Bosch. Vondel felt sufficiently provoked to write Batavische gebroeders of Onderdruckte vryheit (1663), his last political play, in which he explicitly defended the "True Freedom" against Orangism.

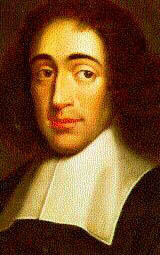
Baruch Spinoza

Though these contributions to Dutch literature were a happy byproduct of the controversy, more important from the standpoint of enduring political science were the key publications by the democratic republican theorists around Baruch Spinoza that were published at the end of the 1660s. Franciscus van den Enden, Spinoza's mentor, went beyond the De la Court brothers in his espousal of political democracy in his Free Political Propositions, published in 1665, which is one of the first systematic statements of democratic republicanism in the western world. Van den Enden argued that government should not only be in the interest of the citizens (as De la Court had proposed), but should create equality of opportunity and be controlled by the people, not the regent oligarchy. Van den Ende acknowledged only two writers that had preceded him with such ideas to his knowledge: Johan de la Court (Pieter's brother with his Consideratiën van Staat of 1660), and Pieter Corneliszoon Plockhoy, whose English-language pamphlet A way propounded to make the poor in these and other nations happy (published in London in 1659) also took aristocrats and priests to task. Plockhoy and Van den Ende first tried to implement their ideas in New Netherland in the early 1660s.

Spinoza, in his Tractatus theologico-politicus, tried to give Van den Enden's political ideas a foundation in his own philosophy, by pointing out that democracy is the best form of government "approaching most closely to that freedom which nature grants to every man". Contrary to the thinking of Thomas Hobbes, Spinoza posited that Man does not give up the rights he possesses in the state of Nature to the State, when he enters the social contract. To him therefore leaving Man as close as possible to that state of Nature is important, and he thinks that democracy accomplishes this best, as it is "the most natural" and "rational" form of government. This theme runs through most Dutch republican doctrine of the 17th century, before resurfacing in the work of the mid-18th-century French republican philosophers, and ultimately in the French Revolution.

Like the De la Court brothers, and Van den Enden, Spinoza stressed the importance of unlimited toleration and freedom of expression. They went much farther in this respect than John Locke, whose Epistola de tolerantia was published in Latin and Dutch in Gouda in 1689, after having been written during Locke's exile in the Republic. Locke did not go further than the Dutch Remonstrants, like Simon Episcopius, in their 1620s polemics about toleration. His was a basically conservative, limited conception of toleration, that was acceptable to "mainstream" thinking of the time, though he denied toleration to atheists and non-monotheist religions. (One has to take into account that Locke was an Englishman, writing for an English public that was scarcely ready for notions of toleration, as William III – no flaming liberal himself – was to discover from the wall of opposition that his attempts to convey toleration on English Catholics encountered later that year).

The Spinozists clothed their demands for toleration in a virulent anticlericalism, because experience had taught them that if the Church was left with autonomy in the state, its prestige would allow it to mobilize the masses against anyone of whose ideas the clergy would disapprove. They insisted consequently on eliminating the autonomy, privileges, property, dominance of education, and censorship functions of the clergy. Lodewijk Meyer, a friend of Spinoza, formulated this in his De jure ecclesiaticorum, as did Pieter de la Court in his Aanwijsing der Heilsame Politieke Gronden (a reformulation of his Interest van Holland, that he published in 1669). It was this anticlericalism that made them vulnerable to attacks by the clergy, leading to the suppression of the Aanwijsing by the States of Holland at the request of the South-Holland Synod in 1669. Spinoza published his Tractatus exclusively in Latin (and objected against attempts to publish translations in French and Dutch), because he hoped in that way to cause as little provocation as possible to the regents.

Nevertheless, such censorship was the exception rather than the rule. As long as one took care to be discreet, and did not cross the boundaries of "blasphemy" as Adriaan Koerbagh was accused of having done in 1669, the authorities were prepared to turn a blind eye to this kind of radical publications (though freedom of the press did not exist de jure). The "True Freedom" as a political concept was accompanied by intellectual freedom in practice, and this practical freedom engendered the formulation of philosophical justifications thereof, that would resound in the later Enlightenment.

== The Second Anglo-Dutch War, 1665–1667 ==
If the Dutch Republicans wanted an example of a Prince who fomented trouble by foreign military adventures to the detriment of the common good, they only had to point across the English Channel to the uncle of the Prince of Orange, Charles II of England. Charles had been restored to the throne of his father in 1660, after first apparently making his peace with the Dutch regents, who had treated him so scornfully after 1654. The end of the Protectorate in England had given the Dutch regents hope that the new English regime might be less bellicose than the Commonwealth. To ensure the good graces of Charles he was extensively fêted during his stay in the Netherlands before his triumphant return to England. It was hoped that the Dutch Gift would further mellow his feelings toward the Dutch, maybe even persuade him to rescind the Navigation Acts. Charles took the opportunity to further the interests of his sister Mary and nephew William (now ten years old) by emphasizing his great affection for both. The Orangists, of course, needed little encouragement to add this to their quiver of arguments in favor of dynastic preferment. But also many opportunistic States-Party regents, discerning a change in the wind, started to make pro-Orange noises, especially in the Amsterdam vroedschap. This disturbed De Witt no end, as he feared that this would undermine the position of his party.

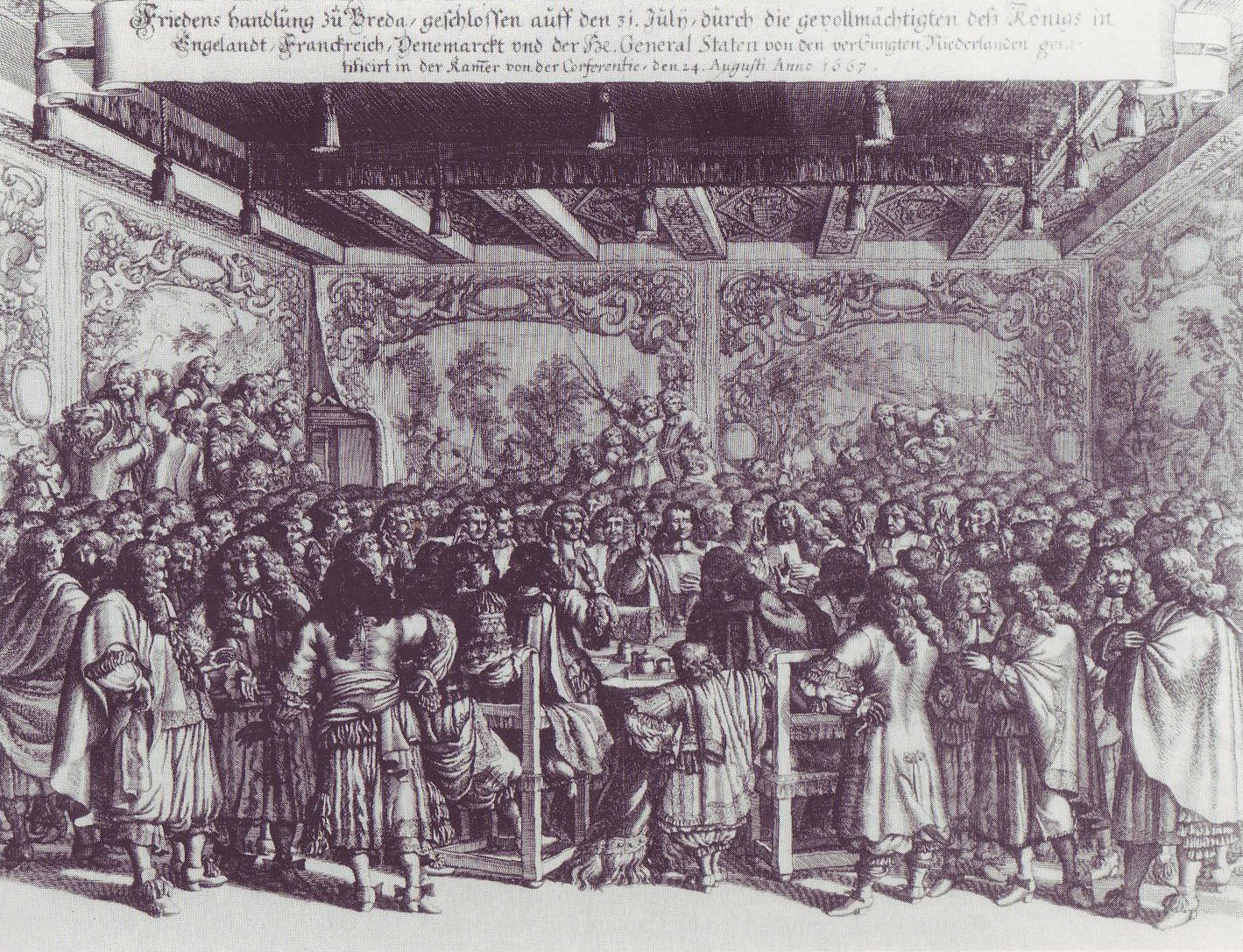
Peace Congress of Breda 1667

Amsterdam now started pushing a special embassy to England that would negotiate a treaty of friendship with Charles II and a defensive alliance against third-party aggression. They hoped to persuade the king to formally rescind the Navigation Acts, and to agree to the principle of "Free Ship, Free Goods" (by which they meant an immunity of neutral ships from visitation and confiscation of contraband in time of war), the latter to prevent a recurrence of the English capture of neutral Dutch shipping in the recent Anglo-Spanish War (1654–1660). The very generous gift to Charles at first seemed to have the desired effect.

However, soon the hopes of the Dutch peace-mongers were dashed with the re-appointment of Sir George Downing as English ambassador in The Hague. Downing had also represented the Commonwealth since 1657, but switched his support to the new régime in time. He was not a friend of the Dutch, as they well knew. On his return he immediately started meddling in Dutch internal affairs by stoking up Orangist sentiment and by undermining De Witt where possible. The situation was ripe for this, as the Princess Mary had made great advances since August 1660, convincing Zeeland and Friesland to come out in favor of promising a future stadtholdership for William. The other provinces did not recognize the Act of Exclusion, as we have seen, and even Holland started to have second thoughts. Leiden and Haarlem proposed that the Prince would be designated stadtholder in future, and De Witt deflected this with some difficulty, at the same time making financial concessions to William's mother, promising to pay for his education as "Child of State". To further mollify her (in hopes of her influencing her brother in favor of the Dutch), the Act of Exclusion was formally revoked in September 1660 (the Commonwealth having expired as a state, this could be excused as not being a breach of treaty).

However, the improvement of De Witt's personal relations with the Prince and his mother came to nought when she suddenly died (24 December 1660), like her late husband also of smallpox. She appointed her brother Charles as William's guardian in her will. This gave the King of England formal stature to interfere in his nephew's education, and in Dutch affairs of state. At the same time, the negotiations about the treaty were not going well. Not only did Charles refuse to retract the Navigation Acts, but he even re-issued them in his own name. A further protectionist measure was the bill before the Cavalier Parliament to restrict fishing in a zone of ten miles from the English coast (though in those days territorial waters were supposed to go no further than three miles). This the Dutch would not recognize.

However, the English obstructionism, also in the matter of the peace with Portugal (which Downing helped to frustrate for a long time) actually helped in the end to unify the Dutch politicians behind De Witt. The Amsterdam regents, seeing that they did not get anywhere with Charles, lost interest in the cause of the Prince. Holland therefore reunited, and the recalcitrant provinces had no chance against a united Holland. Zeeland was brought back in the fold by the aggressive behavior of the new Royal African Company (RAC) against the WIC (in which Zeeland traditionally had an important interest) in West Africa. This threat to its own interests by the English (and especially William's royal uncles) helped cool Zeeland's fervor for the Orangist cause in 1661.

This left only Friesland to support a pro-English course. At Frisian insistence during 1662 the Republic made a concerted effort to conclude the sought-for treaty with England, even if it meant making concessions in the case of trumped-up English demands for compensation for alleged damages in the East Indies. Meanwhile, however, De Witt managed to conclude a treaty of alliance with France in April 1662, among other things guaranteeing the threatened Dutch fisheries. De Witt now felt strengthened enough to start demanding recall of the Dutch plenipotentiaries in England if they could make no progress with the proposed English treaty. Downing, however, calculated that Friesland, and the land provinces, could be counted upon to keep the Dutch position weak, as he thought they would refuse to pay their share of the cost of a war with England. This was in itself not improbable, if only because the land provinces felt threatened by Bernhard von Galen, the Prince-Bishop of Münster, who made territorial demands on parts of Overijssel in the early 1660s. They, not unreasonably, demanded military protection against this aggressor from the Generality. However, Downing miscalculated. De Witt managed to strengthen his position and to start a program of naval rearmament in the summer of 1662. Nevertheless, in the autumn of the same year the Netherlands actually signed a treaty of alliance with England. But relations between the two countries had become so strained that it probably was not worth the parchment it was written on.

Relations continued to deteriorate during 1663 and early 1664. Charles faced the same problem that his father had faced: financial arrangements that kept hm short of money. Parliament had voted him a seemingly generous grant from the customs and excise duties for life, but his financial needs were greater, and he consequently constantly sought additional sources of income. The chartered companies, like the EIC and the RAC, looked promising in this respect, but their profitability depended on a rather predatory method of doing business that brought them in conflict with (especially) their Dutch competitors, the VOC and the WIC. The EIC was no match for the VOC, but the WIC was in its turn weaker than the RAC. The latter company managed in 1664 to conquer most of the trading posts of the WIC in West Africa, while in the same year an English expedition, outfitted by the Duke of York, Charles' brother, captured the WIC colony of New Netherland. These acts of war happened in peacetime. The English were confident that the Dutch, because of their supposed internal divisions, would not react forcefully. Again this was a miscalculation. De Witt ordered Vice-Admiral De Ruyter, who was at the time cruising in the Mediterranean, to retake the WIC forts (even though the WIC was supposed to handle its own affairs; in a way by involving the Dutch navy, De Witt was therefore raising the stakes in the conflict).

Charles declared war in March 1665. Most European courts considered the Dutch the weaker party because (other than the Dutch republican theorists, as we have seen) they considered the Dutch system of government inferior to the English absolute monarchy. Downing predicted that the Dutch would capitulate without a fight. Even if they would fight, they would be hopelessly divided. He expected the land provinces to refuse to pay for the war, or to contribute in other ways to the war. In this he was to be disappointed. Even though the war went badly at first for the Dutch (mainly due to the inferiority of their ships and to poor command), things soon started to pick up when the Dutch naval construction program started to bear fruit, and De Ruyter was put in overall command. Patriotic fervor among the population helped to subdue Orangist dissension for the duration of the war. The inland provinces not only paid their share, but even did this with alacrity. Friesland even raised special loans for its increased share. The fact that bishop von Galen, in alliance with England, invaded the eastern provinces in 1665, and even threatened Friesland, after having overrun Drenthe, probably concentrated Frisian minds wonderfully in this respect.

The initial military débâcle this provoked for the Dutch army did cause trouble for the De Witt regime. De Witt's brother Cornelis, who acted as deputy-in-the-field (a kind of political commissar) to the army's commander-in-chief John Maurice, Prince of Nassau-Siegen (a cousin twice-removed of the Prince of Orange, who however, was acceptable to the States Party) was implicated in the initial panicky retreat behind the IJssel, that left the eastern provinces unprotected. However, now the French intervened, thanks to De Witt's treaty of alliance of 1662. French forces helped stabilize the Dutch front, and when promised English subsidies failed to materialize, von Galen was forced to retreat ignominiously. He concluded a humiliating peace in early 1666.

Things started to look up for the Dutch in the naval war also. Both countries had each other in a strategic death-grip. The English might be stronger in their home waters, but as in the first Anglo-Dutch conflict, the Dutch were able to close down English communications farther afield. This time also, the Danes joined the war on the Dutch side, shored up by a Dutch fleet, and closed the Sound to English shipping and trade. The Hanseatics, on the other hand, ostensibly neutral, helped the Dutch circumvent any English blockades. In the Mediterranean the parties made trade impossible for each other. In the East Indies the VOC swept the EIC from the seas and took this opportunity to help itself to the last remaining English toeholds in the Indonesian archipelago. In other words, English trade was devastated, with predictable results for the economy, and for Charles' finances. This was the crucial factor. The English might arguably win a few more naval battles, and even inflict appreciable damage, as in the raid by admiral Holmes in August 1666, but the end was never in doubt. The strangulating grip of the Dutch blockade got worse by the day, even preventing coal from Newcastle reaching cold Londoners during the winter of 1666.

By 1667 Charles had run out of money. He was forced to lay up his fleet, giving free rein to the Dutch blockade. In June 1667, De Ruyter, now ably assisted by Cornelis de Witt, again as deputy-in-the-field, performed his daring Raid on the Medway, a day that went down in English infamy. But it was less a feat of Dutch arms than one of Dutch finance, as it would not have been possible without the Dutch government simply outspending the English till the latter became exhausted.

The end came soon thereafter. Charles sued for peace and the Dutch achieved most of their war aims with the Treaty of Breda (1667). The Dutch declined to take back New Amsterdam in exchange for Surinam, a decision that may seem unconscionable in modern American eyes, but which in the circumstances of the time must be deemed completely rational: the sugar plantations of Surinam were certainly more valuable than the already hard-pressed fur traders in their environment of hostile New-Englanders. In any case, the next time round, in 1673, the Dutch effortlessly retook "New York" (as it was then styled), renaming it "New Orange", but they again relinquished it to the English, because other things were more valuable.

More important in the long run was that Charles had to recognize the Dutch doctrine of "Free Ship, Free Goods" in the treaty (a concession that was confirmed at the Treaty of Westminster (1674)). This protected neutral Dutch shipping during the many English wars of the 18th century in which the Dutch did not take part, up to the American Revolutionary War (1775–1783). Also, the Navigation Acts were modified in the sense that the German hinterland was recognized as a legitimate place of origin for Dutch commerce, appreciably softening the protectionist bite of those Acts. The territorial concessions of the English were insignificant in comparison.

An intriguing internal political accompaniment to the war was the affair that has become known as the "Buat Conspiracy". Henri Buat, a French officer in the Dutch States Army, was part of the retinue of the young Prince of Orange. He was engaged, at a low level, in an English conspiracy to bring about an Orangist coup d'état in August 1666, to overthrow the De Witt regime, end the war, and restore the stadtholderate. Buat, who handled English diplomatic correspondence with the knowledge and consent of De Witt, handed over the wrong letter to the Dutch pensionary in a moment of confusion. This letter exposed the plot and the main plotters. One of them was Johan Kievit, the corrupt Rotterdam regent who would play an ignominious role in the murder of the De Witt brothers in 1672. Though the whole affair was rather farcical, it strengthened De Witt's hand appreciably against his Orangist opponents. De Witt was able to tighten his hold on the "Child of State", among others, by having the Prince's beloved governor, his illegitimate uncle, Frederick Nassau de Zuylestein, removed from the Prince's entourage. Apparently, this earned him the enduring enmity of the impressionable boy, who loved the older man dearly. The episode also for the moment put paid to attempts to appoint the Prince to the Raad van State.

== Mounting tensions with France ==
Meanwhile, relations with France started to deteriorate, also. Since the days of Henry IV, France had been an important ally of the Republic. In 1635 during the Republic's war with Spain, Cardinal Richelieu, Louis XIII's chief minister, concluded a treaty with the Republic in which the parties agreed to attack the Spanish Netherlands on two fronts in that year. Those provinces were to be granted the status of free Cantons on the Swiss model, if they cooperated, but in case of resistance there was to be a partition of the country in which the French would receive the French-speaking provinces and western Flanders, and the Dutch Antwerp, the Scheldt Estuary, and Ghent, Bruges, and Mechelen. The States Party of the time was not happy with this arrangement, because the reintegration of Antwerp in the Republic would upset the cosy arrangement that kept Antwerp's trade bridled in favor of Amsterdam's. However, this partition treaty was pushed through by stadtholder Frederick Henry, Prince of Orange, and the Orangist regents, many of whom were generously bribed by Richelieu. Nothing much came of these plans. The formidable Spanish Army of Flanders checked the attack by putting up a strategic defense against France, and vigorously attacking the Dutch. The offensive of 1635 almost turned into a disaster for the Dutch, after their invasion was repelled, and the Spaniards successfully counterattacked. The French were too weak to make a large impression.

Though the treaty prohibited conclusion of a separate peace with Spain, the Republic nevertheless concluded such a peace in 1648, leaving France to face Spain alone till the Peace of the Pyrenees in 1659. This caused a decided coolness in the relations between the countries up to the time Louis XIV personally took up the reins in 1661. However, at this time the partition treaty was still formally in force between the two countries, something to be held in reserve in case the need arose. Of course, the Dutch now being on very good terms with the Spanish, did not for a moment intend to join Louis in any designs against the Spanish Netherlands, and such designs were for the moment in abeyance, as Louis had just married Maria Theresa of Spain, the daughter of king Philip IV of Spain, as a guarantee of good relations between France and Spain. One of the conditions of the marriage contract, on which other conditions were contingent, was a large dowry that Spain would pay to France. Philip IV died, however, in 1665 without the dowry having been properly paid. Louis then (declaring the conditions in the marriage treaty in which his wife renounced her rights to the Spanish Crown and its possessions void, because of non-compliance with the dowry condition) construed a claim of his wife on the Duchy of Brabant. The new Spanish government rejected this, but its position was weakened, because its forces were fully committed at the time in the Portuguese Restoration War that was still raging. Its once formidable Army of Flanders had been almost disbanded by this time.

The diplomatic unrest around this question disturbed De Witt no end. His initial relations with Louis had been very amicable. In 1662 he renewed the old alliance with France, as we have seen, and this alliance was helpful in the conflict with England and Munster, when the French sent auxiliary troops to help shore up the Dutch eastern defenses in 1665. Except for the Caribbean, France did not take part in the war with England. As a matter of fact the new French West India Company, formed in 1664, took Cayenne by force away from the WIC in 1665, but the Dutch were forced to grin and bear this, because of the ongoing war with England at the time. But the way Louis was acting in the matter of the Spanish Netherlands made De Witt anxious that the old partition treaty should not become operational. It offered a number of equally unpalatable prospects for the Dutch: unwanted incorporation of Antwerp (the blockade of which was now enshrined in the peace treaty of 1648 with Spain) would open up that city's trade; and a resurgent France as an immediate neighbor would necessitate the building up of the standing army, an expense the regents wanted to avoid at all costs.

For the moment De Witt rejected Spanish feelers for a defensive alliance against France, even when the Spanish envoy made an unauthorized threat that Spain would abandon the Southern Netherlands to France, in exchange for Roussillon and Navarre. De Witt recognized this as an empty bluff. As France invaded the Spanish Netherlands in 1667, starting the War of Devolution, De Witt started discussions with Spain, however, in hope of deterring France, and staking out a claim in case Spanish resistance would collapse. Spain received a large Dutch loan, with a number of Flemish cities as collateral, and De Witt now pointedly obtained permission to occupy these pawns as a guarantee of repayment.

As the French made slow, but inexorable progress, De Witt, though very reluctant to intervene, thought up a solution for his dilemma that would stop the French advance, without necessitating Dutch military intervention, or even (as he hoped) forcing a break with France. He now concluded the Triple Alliance (1668) with England and Sweden. This was an armed coalition of the three countries that forced their mediation on France and Spain. France was to be appeased with all territorial gains it had up to then achieved by military means in the Southern Netherlands (among which the cities of Lille and Cambrai), and Spain was further called upon to cede either Luxembourg, or the Franche-Comté. The only thing that was required of Louis was that he halt his advance. This lopsided award was designed to placate Louis, without spoiling the relations with the Republic. The not-so-secret sting in the deal was that the three would intervene militarily if Louis rejected this generous award. Louis therefore complied at the Congress of Aix-la-Chapelle (1668) with the demands of the allies, but he took the humiliation very hard. After this he started to plot with Charles II of England and the prince-bishop of Munster (who had his own revenge needs after 1666) and the Elector of Cologne, Maximilian Henry of Bavaria, who resented Dutch interference with his attempts to subdue the Free City of Cologne. This resulted in a number of secret arrangements, among which the Secret treaty of Dover, designed to start a war of aggression against the Dutch Republic in 1672, and to divide that country among the participants.

Before that hot war started, France and the Republic already became engaged in an economic war, however. France had always been a very important trading partner with the Republic, especially since the 1640s. Sales of Dutch textiles, spices and other colonial wares, herring, whale products, Delftware and Gouda pipes, Baltic naval stores, tobacco products, and refined sugar (for a large part of raw sugar from French-Caribbean plantations) had greatly expanded in France. On the other hand, the Republic was a very large importer of French wine, brandy, salt, silk, paper, vinegar and Breton sail-canvas (often for reexport from its entrepot). In other words, the two economies complemented each other to a large extent (other than the Dutch and English economies, that mainly competed in the same markets). This complementarity would in modern eyes be seen as a happy opportunity for exploiting comparative advantage by specialization, which it indeed became in the years up to the mid-1650s. Unfortunately, in those days trade was seen as a zero-sum game (also by the Dutch incidentally); both parties suspected being exploited by the other.

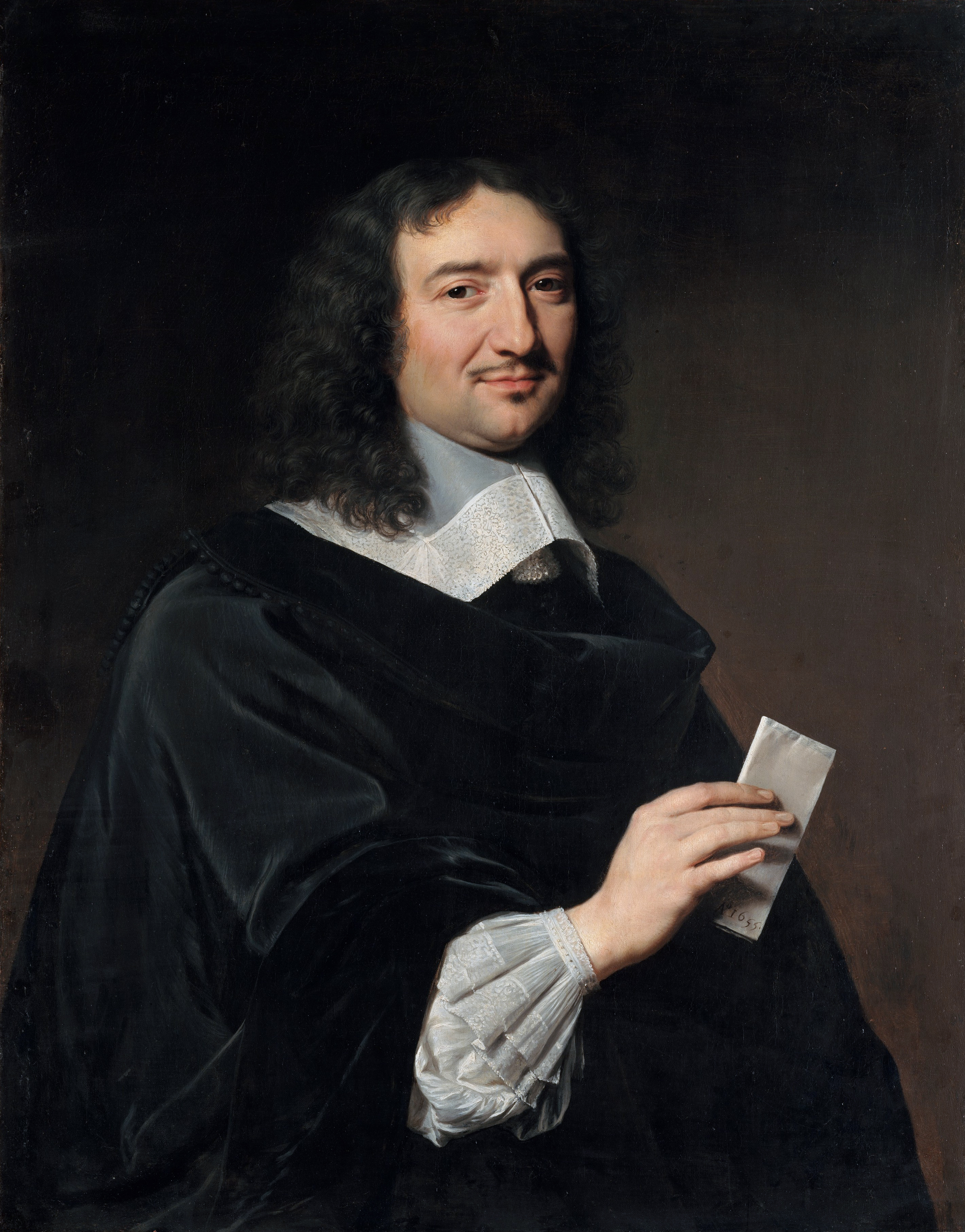
Jean-Baptiste Colbert in 1666, by Philippe de Champaigne

Not being an economist, Louis resented the preponderant share in the French market, taken by the Dutch, on basically emotional grounds, but his new Superintendent of Finances, Jean-Baptiste Colbert, gave focused impetus to this resentment by a well-organised complex of economic policies, of a mercantilist nature. The first of these was his tariff list of 1664, which was calculated to just wrest away important French markets from the Dutch, without completely closing down trade (except for the trade in refined sugar, which was hit with a prohibitive tariff). However, in 1667 this was followed with a much more draconian list that doubled tariffs on Dutch fine cloth, linen, and Delftware; quadrupled them on whale products (for which France was Holland's biggest customer); and raised them sevenfold for tobacco products.

Another measure, directed directly at the Dutch trade system outside the direct Franco-Dutch relations, was the founding of a number of chartered trading companies that were intended to compete with the Dutch VOC and WIC, but also make inroads on the Dutch Baltic trade, like the already mentioned West India Company and the French East India Company, both formed in 1664, and given monopolies in France. These caused the Dutch some anxiety, but proved eventually not very successful. The same applied to the Compagnie du Nord that Colbert set up in 1669 to compete with the Dutch in Scandinavia. This was supposed to engross the Dutch salt trade with especially Norway, and replace it with French salt. Unfortunately, the French salt with a high magnesium content proved unfit for preserving herring (as the Dutch could have told Colbert, because they had tried to sell it to the Norwegians themselves, when the Iberian salt trade was closed to them). France therefore had to subsidise these exports, and also the otherwise uncompetitive French shipping rates. Despite government pressure the Bordeaux wine merchants were unwilling to shift their exports away from Dutch carriers, or do without Dutch pre-financing of their operations. The unprofitability of its operations, combined with Dutch dumping policies in the trade of Baltic naval stores, forced the winding up of the company in 1675.

Nevertheless, thanks to the importance of the French market to the Dutch, and the fact that the Dutch had less possibilities of imposing counter-pressure than they had in their conflicts with the English, the Dutch government at first tried to ignore the hostile policies of Colbert. Its inaction was also caused by differences of opinion about how best to proceed within the States Party. Amsterdam, and especially the Amsterdam diplomat Coenraad van Beuningen, argued in favor of firm economic counter-measures against the French economic policies, paired with the forming of a defensive alliance with Spain and the Holy Roman Empire. De Witt, however, preferred avoiding such foreign entanglements, and a conciliatory approach in the economic sphere. As their economic interests were severely damaged by the French protectionism, the industrial cities of Leiden and Haarlem, however, teamed up with Amsterdam to support a more belligerent diplomacy. After the Rotterdam regents were promised compensation for the damage to their wine trade, to get their assent, the States of Holland decided in 1671 on severe retaliatory measures against French imports, in effect banning French wine, vinegar, paper, and sail-canvas. The stage was now set for war.

== The end of the De-Witt regime ==
The war started in March 1672. An English fleet attacked the Dutch Smyrna convoy in the Channel, as in the previous two conflicts without a declaration of war. That was to follow only after France had declared war on April 6. The French army was the largest in Europe at the time. Louis assembled 118,000 infantry and 12,500 cavalry against a regular Dutch army that numbered at most 30,000. That Dutch army, long neglected by the De-Witt regime, was also qualitatively inferior. The regents belatedly tried to reinforce it with contingents of the citizen militias, but it was all too little, too late. The Dutch enclaves in present-day Germany, Cleves and Lingen, were quickly overrun by the Elector of Cologne, the Munsterites, and the French, a long list of venerable fortresses being taken almost without a shot fired. Then the French stormed across the Rhine at Lobith on June 12, outflanking the main Dutch eastern line of defense at the IJssel. The Dutch now hastily retreated to the Hollandse Waterlinie, thereby abandoning all but the provinces of Holland, Zeeland, and Utrecht to the enemy. The French followed at their leisure, experiencing little resistance, as the citizens of first Arnhem, and then Utrecht rioted, and forced their city governments to capitulate without a fight.

But there the advance halted. The waterline defense was filling up, despite the summer drought, inundating vast tracts of land across the path of the advancing French, which effectively blocked them. Louis did not mind, as he expected the Dutch to know they were beaten, allowing him to await their peace offers in his headquarters in Utrecht. He did not have long to wait. The Dutch government was in a complete funk. Defeatism among the regents was rife. Against the advice of De Witt, the States of Holland already before the fall of Utrecht on June 23, had sent the Rotterdam Pensionary, Pieter de Groot (the son of Grotius) to parley with the king's envoys Louvois and Pomponne. He returned to the Hague with the bleak message that capitulation was the only option. The States concurred, hoping to save the Republic proper, and the free exercise of the Reformed religion (Louis had already had the Utrecht cathedral reconsecrated to Catholic worship), but being prepared to sign away the Generality Lands.

But now the remarkable popular insurrection began that would save the Republic, and overturn the States-Party regime. Protests began in De Witt's hometown, Dordrecht, and soon spread to Rotterdam, Schiedam, Leiden and Amsterdam. In Rotterdam and Amsterdam the militias forced the vroedschap to vote against the capitulation. Nevertheless, on June 26 the States General voted four to three (Holland, and the three already occupied provinces Utrecht, Gelderland and Overijssel, against the rest) to send De Groot with a mandate to sign away the Generality Lands and offer a large war indemnity to Louis. Louis thought the offer insufficient, and sent De Groot back empty-handed. It was the last offer he would get.

To understand what happened next we have to digress about the position of the Prince of Orange. During the war with England, and the Buat Conspiracy, the Orangists had to lie low, as we have seen. However, under the gathering clouds of the conflict with France, and because the Prince finally got to the age where he could plausibly be proposed for actual public office in his own right (his cousin Willem Frederick died in 1664, taking the cadet branch of the family temporarily out of the running as the Frisian stadtholdership was now taken by an infant). The pressure on De Witt to allow a role for William therefore started to mount inexorably, putting him on the defensive. However, he celebrated one final triumph of the "True Freedom", when in 1667 he managed to engineer the final abolition of the stadtholderate, not only in Holland, but also in Utrecht, Gelderland and Overijssel. These provinces signed the so-called Perpetual Edict (1667) which abolished the office of stadtholder in these provinces "forever" (the Act of Seclusion had only stated that no Prince of Orange could hold that office), separating the captaincy-general of the Union from the stadtholderate of any of the provinces (to close the door to the Frisian stadtholder), and transferring the functions of the stadtholder permanently to the States in Holland.

The triumph was short-lived, and somewhat pyrrhic, however. It actually made the elevation of William to the office of captain-general in February 1672, more difficult to deflect, as the danger of a combination of the functions of stadtholder and commander-in-chief no longer threatened. The 21-year-old Prince was therefore duly given the command of the army (with De Witt's grudging assent), just before the war started, making him share in the responsibility for the military debacle, which he, of course, in the circumstances could not avoid. De Witt hoped to control him with the deputies-in-the-field, an institution that Marlborough would come heartily to detest when he in turn was appointed lieutenant-captain-general of the Union in 1702. But circumstances now allowed him to wrest free from political control.

At first the Prince was swept along in the political turmoil. As head of the federal army he felt a responsibility to maintain public order where it had broken down, often because the city militias had come out against the city governments. An interesting political development started to take shape, in which the Orangist mob (against which normally both the States Party and the Orangist regents would have formed a common front) injected a decidedly "democratic" element into Dutch politics. The mob, incited by the Calvinist preachers as usual, demanded not only a purge of the States Party regents, but also an alteration of detested policies, like toleration of dissenting Protestants. The main demand, of course, was the abolition of the Perpetual Edict, and the appointment of William to the restored stadtholdership. He was therefore, in effect, put in power by the people in July 1672. The Orangist regents (hoping this would be a one-off aberration) legitimized this "unconstitutional" interference of the common people in what they, too, considered "their" affairs, after the fact as a "patriotic" and necessary check on regent presumption, which was justified by the emergency. It is nevertheless remarkable, and somewhat ironic, that now Orangist ideology also had a "democratic" variant.

William was appointed stadtholder of Zeeland on July 2; the States of Holland followed suit the next day. Of course, the old prerogatives of the stadtholder, like appointing the city governments, even in the voting cities, abolished in December 1650, were also restored. At first William did not move against the States Party, but the mob unrest continued apace, despite the fact that the Orangist demand had been met. In city after city the States Party regents were now molested. Rotterdam Pensionary De Groot, the would-be signer of the capitulation, had to flee to Antwerp. In Amsterdam the transfer of power had an orderly character, but elsewhere violence was used. In Rotterdam the militia forced the vroedschap to oust the remaining States Party regents, as in Dordrecht.

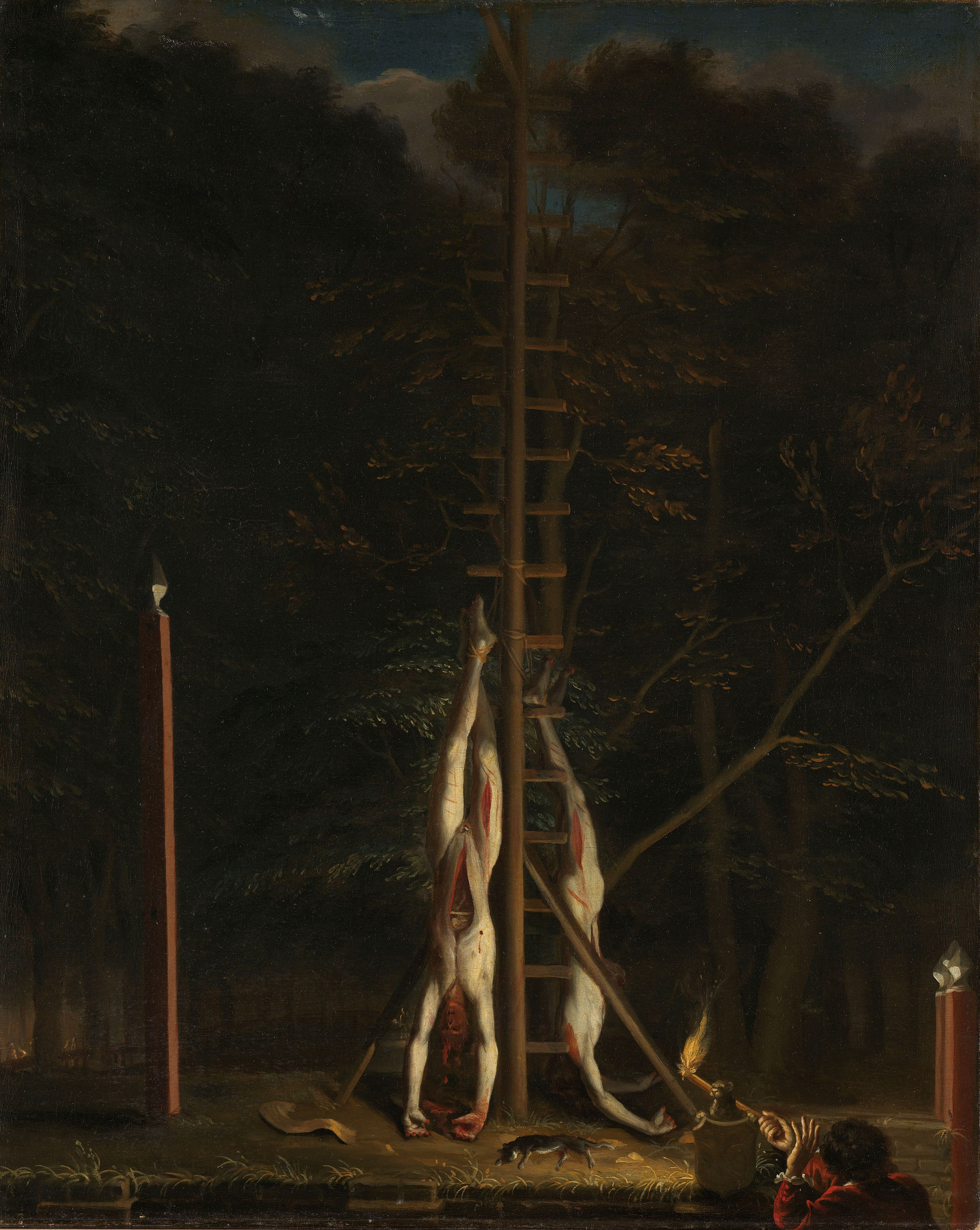
The bodies of the brothers De Witt, by Jan de Baen.

In the Hague events took a particularly ugly turn. De Witt was severely wounded by a knife-wielding assassin on June 21. He resigned as Grand Pensionary on August 4, but this was not enough for his enemies. His brother Cornelis (De Ruyter's deputy-in-the-field at the Raid on the Medway), particularly hated by the Orangists, was arrested on trumped up charges of treason. He was tortured (as was usual under the Roman-Dutch system of law, that required a confession before a conviction was possible) but refused to confess. Nevertheless, he was sentenced to exile. When his brother went over to the jail (which was only a few steps from his house) to help him get started on his journey, both were attacked by members of the Hague civic militia in a clearly orchestrated assassination. The brothers were shot and then left to the mob. Their naked, mutilated bodies were strung up on the nearby public gibbet, while the Orangist mob partook of their roasted livers in a cannibalistic frenzy. Throughout it all, a remarkable discipline was maintained by the mob, according to contemporary observers, making one doubt the spontaneity of the event.

Thus ended the life of Johan de Witt, who had in effect ruled the Republic for almost twenty years. His regime outlasted him only a few more days. Though no more people were killed, the lynching of De Witts lent renewed impetus to the mob attacks, and to help restore public order the States of Holland empowered William on August 27 to purge the city councils in any way he would see fit to restore public order. The following purges in the early days of September were accompanied by large, but peaceful, Orangist demonstrations, that had a remarkable political character. The demonstrations delivered petitions that demanded certain additional reforms with a, in a sense, "reactionary" flavor: the "ancient" privileges of the guilds and civic militias (who were traditionally seen as mouthpieces of the citizenry as a whole) to curb the regent's powers were to be recognized again (as in pre-Burgundian times). The demonstrators also demanded more influence of the Calvinist preachers on the content of government policies and a roll-back of the toleration of Catholics and other dissenting denominations. The purges of the city governments were not everywhere equally thoroughgoing (and, of course, there was little mention of popular influence later on, as the new regents shared the abhorrence of the old ones of real democratic reforms). But as a whole, the new Orangist regime of the Stadtholder was well-entrenched during his following reign.

== Aftermath ==
The question whether William had a hand in the murder of the De-Witt brothers will always remain unanswered, like his exact role in the later Massacre of Glencoe. The fact that he ordered the withdrawal of a federal cavalry detachment, that otherwise might have prevented the lynching, has always raised eyebrows, however, like the fact that he did not prosecute the well-known ringleaders like Cornelis Tromp and his relative, Johan Kievit, the Buat conspirator, who now was appointed pensionary of Rotterdam, and even advanced their careers. But maybe firm measures against the conspirators were not feasible in the political climate of those fraught days in the Fall of 1672.

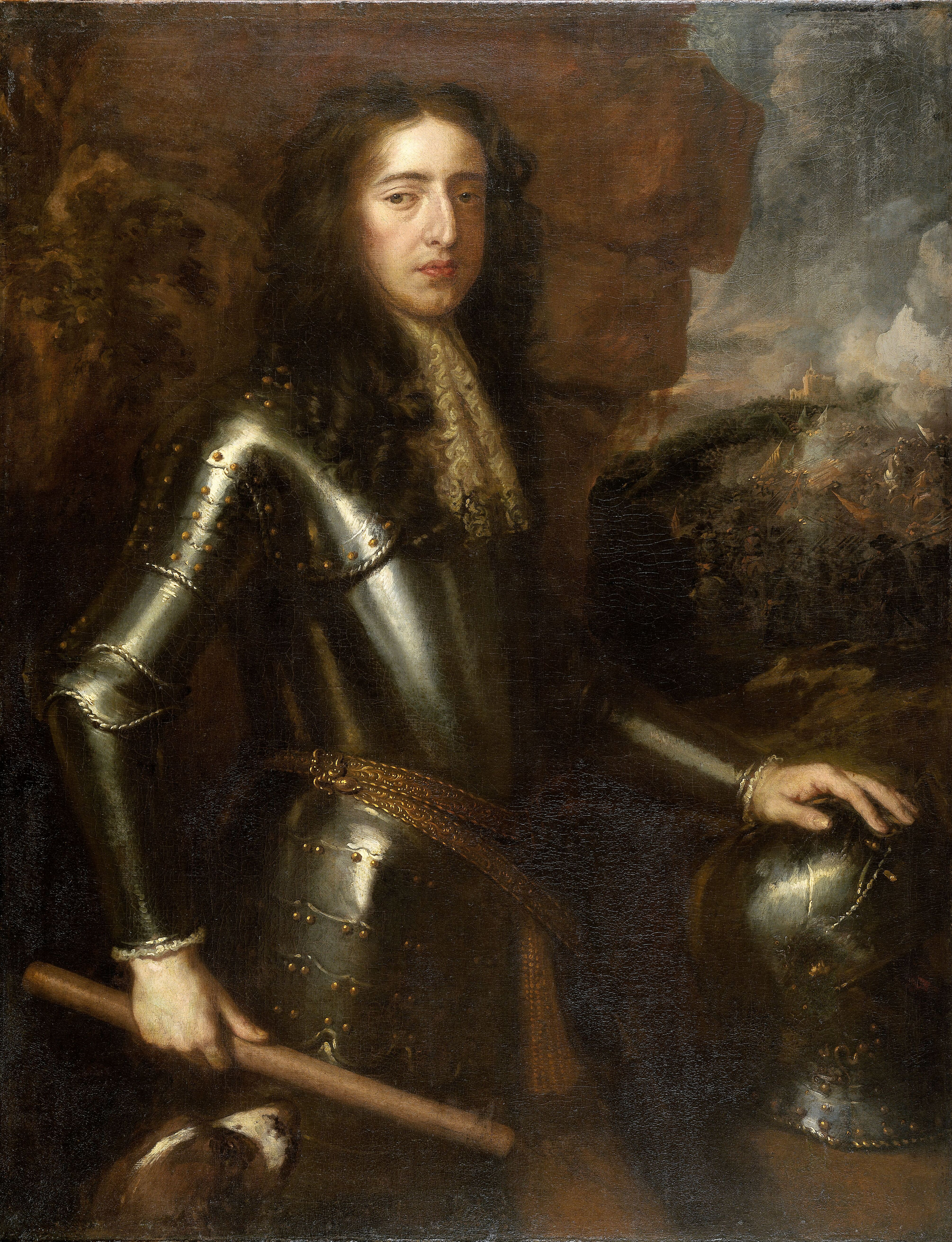
Stadtholder William III of Orange, by Peter Lely

In any case, the political turmoil did not enable the allies an opportunity to finish the Republic off. The French were effectively stymied by the water defenses. Only when the inundations froze over in the following winter was there, briefly, a chance for Marshal Luxembourg, who had taken over command of the invading army from Louis, to make an incursion with 10,000 troops on skates. This almost ended in disaster, when they were ambushed. Meanwhile, the States General managed to conclude alliances with the German emperor and Brandenburg, which helped relieve the French pressure in the East.

The war at sea went badly from the start for the allies because of the genius of Lieutenant-Admiral De Ruyter, whose exploits at this time earned him the admiration of admiral Alfred Thayer Mahan who in his seminal work The Influence of Sea Power Upon History, 1660–1783 points out the tactical advantage the Dutch admiral derived from the "local terrain" (if one may speak of "terrain" at sea) when battling the combined Anglo-French fleets in the shallow waters off the Dutch coast, and later his strategic use of the "fleet-in-being" to checkmate the numerically superior allied fleets. De Ruyter's successes, both defensively and offensively, combined with the successes of other Dutch admirals (New York was retaken by a Zeeland fleet, for instance) and Dutch privateers, again severely damaged English commerce. After Parliament refused to vote him a war budget in 1674, threatening a repeat of 1667, Charles was driven from the war thanks to Spanish mediation. The Peace of Westminster was a condition of the Spanish to enter the war against France on the Dutch side, because they did not want to fight both England and France simultaneously. The Dutch were therefore compelled to relinquish New York again. The peace brought England no net gains at all, however. Hopes of territorial gains in the Netherlands proper, that Charles had entertained before the war, were dashed. The Dutch did, however, replace the subsidies from Louis that the latter now no longer paid. Those had been a waste of money, anyway.

Soon after, France's German allies were driven from the war, in an equally humiliating way. Dutch troops reconquered all lands lost to Munster. A strategic thrust to the fortress of Bonn in late 1673 forced the French to evacuate the areas she occupied in the Republic, except for Maastricht and Grave. By then the reconstituted Dutch army had again become a formidable force, as in the 1640s, its strength rising to 100,000 men, almost as large as the French army (France had a population ten times as large in these days as that of the Republic). This was accomplished by great financial outlay in the hiring of mercenary troops. But the Republic had the financial wherewithal to bear this burden, despite French hopes that it would break the Republic. The war went on till the Peace of Nijmegen in 1678. Here the Dutch finally obtained the retraction of Colbert's tariff of 1667, that had set off the economic war. However, the handling of the peace negotiations, in which Louis managed to divide his enemies, and entice the Dutch (against the wishes of William, who perceived the diplomatic cost) to conclude a separate peace, cost the Republic dearly in reputation and good will with its allies.

The Peace solved nothing. Louis continued his aggressive policies for the rest of his life, and William spent the rest of his life as the great frustrator of Louis' ambitions. This led to the epic conflicts between France and its allies on the one hand, and the Republic and its allies on the other, around the turn of the 18th century. England was brought into the Dutch camp by the preventive invasion (brought about by Dutch fears of a repeat of the combined Anglo-French attack of 1672) of 1688, later known as the Glorious Revolution. This brought William to the English throne, which, with its greater population and resources, became William's new political and economic focus in pursuing his wars against Louis XIV. The Dutch Republic became the junior party in this union with England, as bankers and entrepreneurs moved with William to London, taking the innovations that had enabled Dutch preeminence in the prior decades with them. London became the new center of commerce, at the expense of the Dutch cities. Thus, while the Glorious Revolution appeared at first as the ultimate triumph of the Dutch over their English adversaries, it turned into their kiss of death.

When William died on the eve of the War of Spanish Succession in 1702, the regents that had been his faithful ministers in the Republic immediately reverted to De Witt's "True Freedom", refusing to appoint the Frisian stadtholder John William Friso, Prince of Orange (designated as his heir in his will) stadtholder in the other provinces, despite the fact that the stadtholderate had been declared hereditary in Holland in 1674. This implied that the Second Stadtholderless Period had started. The new regime, however, continued the policies of William, and the alliance with England, at least up to the Peace of Utrecht in 1713.

== Sources ==
- Israel, J.I. (1989), Dutch Primacy in World Trade 1585–1740, Clarendon Press Oxford, ISBN 0-19-821139-2
- Israel, J.I. (1995), The Dutch Republic: Its Rise, Greatness and Fall, 1477–1806, Oxford University Press,ISBN 0-19-873072-1 hardback, ISBN 0-19-820734-4 paperback
