= Hieronymus van Beverningh =

Dutch regent, diplomat, amateur botanist and patron of the arts

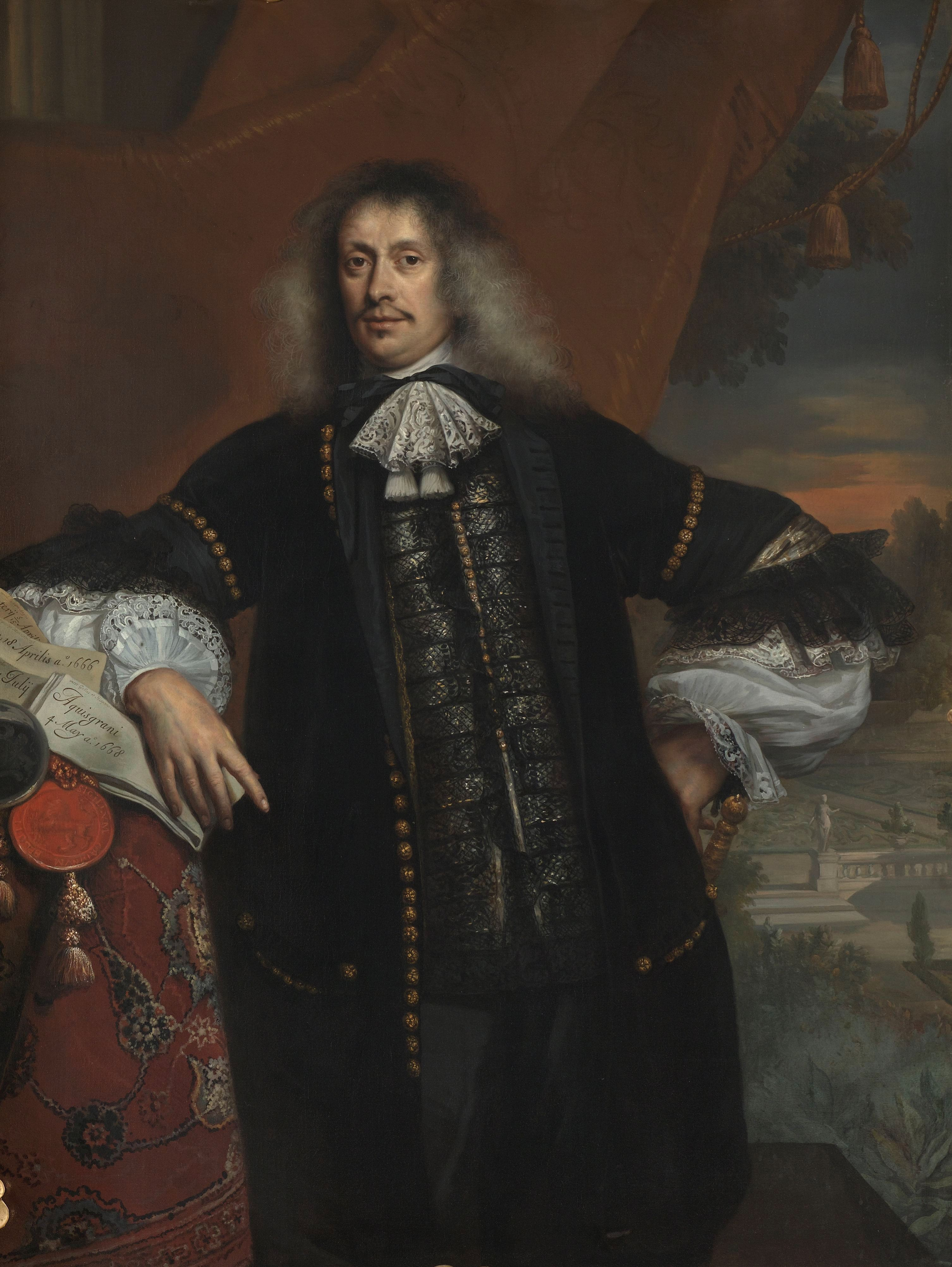
Hieronymus van Beverningh by Jan de Baen

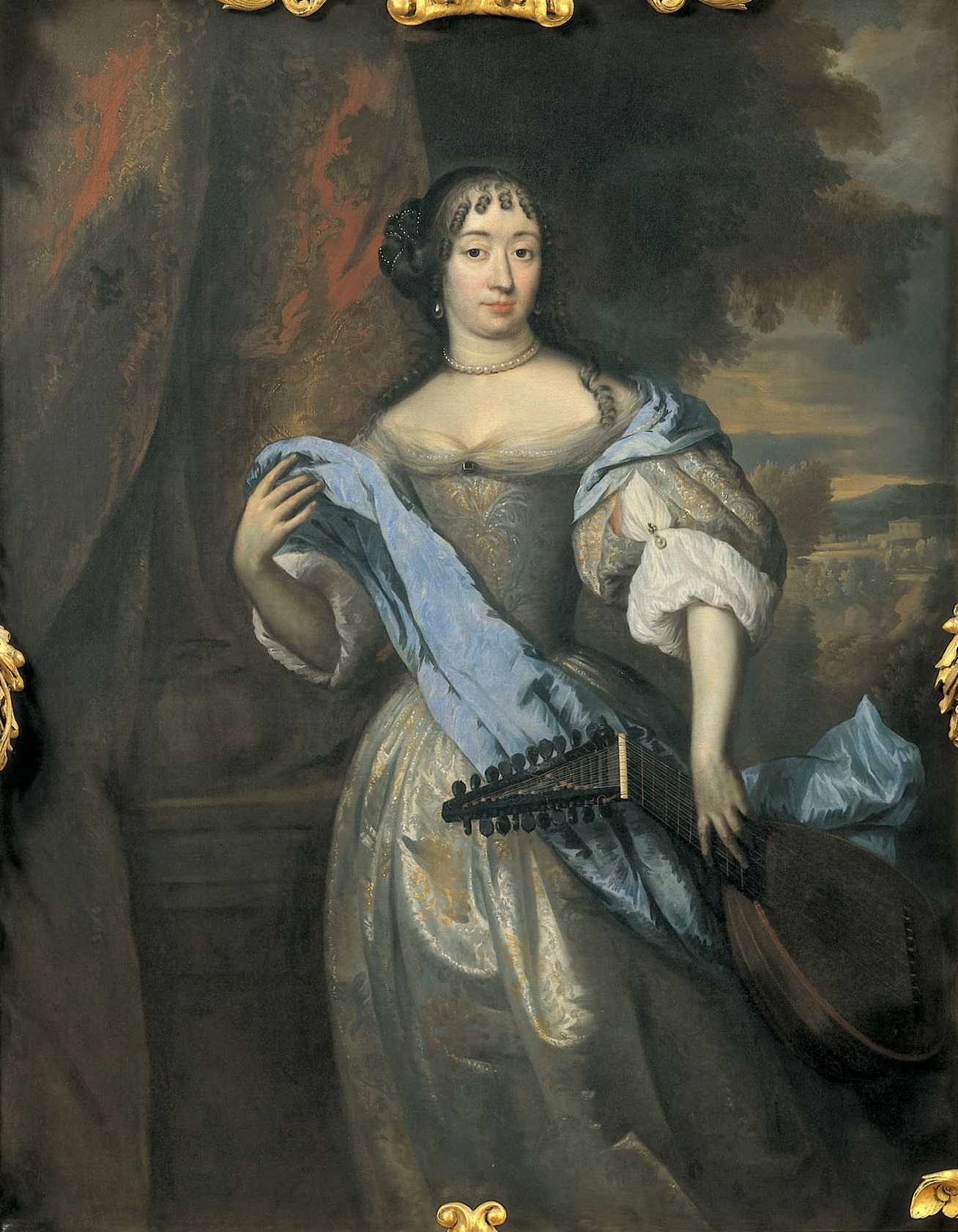
Johanna le Gillon (1635–1706) by Jan de Baen

Hieronymus van Beverningh (sometimes spelled Beverningk) (Gouda, April 25, 1614 – Oud Teylingen, October 30, 1690) was a prominent Dutch regent, diplomat, amateur botanist, and patron of the arts, who lived during the Dutch Golden Age.

== Biography ==
=== Early life ===
Beverningh was the son of Melchior Beverningh, a captain in the States Army and Sibilla Standert. His grandfather, Johan Beverningh, was a Prussian officer who had taken a commission in the States Army and reached the rank of lieutenant-general of artillery.

He studied at the Latin school in his birthplace Gouda under Jacobus Hovius and at the University of Leiden. After his studies he made the usual "grand tour" of a Dutch gentleman to France. He married Johanna le Gillon on April 4, 1655, a marriage that was to remain childless.

Beverningh was coopted in the Gouda vroedschap and elected schepen in 1645. The very next year he was sent as a deputy to the States of Holland. In 1651 he represented the province of Holland in the Groote Vergadering (the "Great Assembly", a kind of constitutional assembly) of that year, which inaugurated the First Stadtholderless Period in the Dutch Republic. In 1653 (the year in which Johan de Witt became Grand Pensionary) Beverningh was made a member of the Holland delegation in the States-General of the Netherlands. De Witt and he were to become close associates in the States Party.

=== Peace of Westminster and Act of Seclusion ===
De Witt would have been happy to have a sent a single negotiator, but the other provinces would not agree, so together with another Holland Regent, Willem Nieupoort, and representatives of the provinces of Zeeland (Paulus van de Perre) and Friesland (Allart Pieter van Jongestall), Beverningh was sent as a plenipotentiary to the Commonwealth of England to negotiate the Treaty of Westminster (1654) that was to end the First Anglo-Dutch War. The already complicated negotiations were made more difficult when they reached an apparent impasse over the English demand that the young Prince of Orange William III (three years of age at the time) would be excluded from the offices that his father, William II, Prince of Orange and other ancestors had held in the Republic, like that of Stadtholder of Holland and Zeeland, and Captain general of the Union. To De Witt, and his States-Party faction of Holland regents, like Cornelis de Graeff, this demand was not unacceptable, but they knew that the other provinces would consider it an intolerable intervention in Dutch internal affairs. To overcome this obstacle to a peace that both parties by now strongly desired De Witt therefore engaged in a brazen intrigue. He secretly arranged that the two Holland negotiators would engage in surreptitious parallel negotiations with Oliver Cromwell behind the back of Jongestal (Van der Perre had died by that time).

Cromwell and Beverningh agreed to a secret annex to the draft treaty, that would become known as the Act of Seclusion. This Act was to be solely signed and ratified by the States of Holland, without the knowledge of the other Dutch provinces. It contained the solemn undertaking of the States of Holland that they would never appoint William stadtholder in their province, and would bar his appointment to high federal office in the Republic. After the States General ratified the treaty, without the secret annex, the States of Holland convened in secret session a few days later to discuss the secret annex. It was ratified over the objection of five Orangist cities by the States, and the instrument of ratification was sent to Beverningh in London, however with the instruction not to hand it over, unless it was absolutely necessary.

Meanwhile, the clerk of De Witt, Jan van Messem, betrayed the secret existence of the Act to the stadtholder of Friesland, William's kinsman Willem Frederik of Nassau-Dietz. The Frisian States now demanded an inquiry in the States General into the conduct of Beverningh and the other negotiators. The States-General instructed the negotiators to hand over their papers, including the instrument of ratification unless that no longer was in their possession. De Witt, always a master of the legalistic phrase, was the author of this clause. He also persuaded the States-General to send the instruction in cipher, under a letter in plaintext in his own hand, warning Beverningh of what was afoot. Thus forewarned Beverningh immediately handed over the instrument of ratification to Cromwell, while the instructions were still laboriously being deciphered by the Dutch delegation. He therewith confronted the States-General with a fait accompli.

The resulting scandal was eventually laid to rest, but the States of Friesland blocked Beverningh's appointment as thesaurier-generaal (Treasurer) of the Union, that was first proposed by Holland in 1654, until 1657 (during which time the function was formally left vacant).

=== Later official career ===
Besides his office of Treasurer, which he would fulfil till 1665, and that of representative in the States-General, Beverningh regularly undertook important diplomatic missions for the Republic. The most important were his negotiations with the Elector of Brandenburg in 1665 about an alliance during the Second Anglo-Dutch War and the peace negotiations with the Prince-Bishop of Münster in the same year. In 1667 he led the Dutch delegation that negotiated the Treaty of Breda that ended that war with England. In 1668 he helped negotiate the Triple Alliance (1668) and the ensuing Treaty of Aix-la-Chapelle. In 1674 he led the Dutch delegation that negotiated the Treaty of Westminster (1674) that ended the Third Anglo-Dutch War. Finally, in 1678 he helped negotiate the Treaty of Nijmegen that ended the Franco-Dutch War

Meanwhile, he was appointed schout and later burgemeester of his native city. He acted as gedeputeerde-te-velde (a kind of political commissar) at the headquarters of William III in the campaign against the French during the Year of Disaster, 1672. After the popular revolution that brought William to power as stadtholder, and brought about the fall of the De Witt regime, Beverningh quickly changed sides from the States party (of which he had been a prominent exponent) and joined the new regime. He was one of the Gouda regents who welcomed the new stadtholder at a festive banquet in the city.

=== Final years ===
After he had negotiated a commercial treaty with Sweden in 1679, he retired from public life. He had been appointed a regent of Leiden University in 1673. In these later years he embarked on a scientific career that would bring him plaudits from colleagues including Carl Linnaeus, who would later credit the discovery of a nasturtium (Tropaeus majus) to him. He maintained a botanical garden at his estate Oud-Teylingen (or Lokhorst) not far from Leiden that contained many rare plants. This garden inspired the German botanist Jacobus Breynius to write his Prodromus fasciculi rariorum plantarum in Hortis Hollandiae (vol. I 1680, vol. II, 1689), which he dedicated to Beverningh.

Beverningh also acted as a maecenas, enabling the German born botanist Paul Hermann to travel to Ceylon (currently Sri Lanka), a journey that resulted in his Paradisus Batavus (1698), a standard work about orchids. He helped finance the purchase of the library of Isaac Vossius for the Leiden University Library.

While helping to catalog this library, Beverningh fell ill (after he fell off a stepladder). He died at his estate after a short illness in October, 1690. He was buried in the tomb he had bought in 1668 from the Blois-van-Treslong family, in the Janskerk (Gouda).

Political offices
Preceded by G. Brasser	Treasurer-General of the United Provinces; 1657–1665	Succeeded by Coenraad Burgh
