= Willem Nieupoort =

Dutch politician and diplomat

Willem Nieupoort (30 January 1607, in Schiedam – 2 May 1678, in The Hague) was a Dutch States Party politician, ambassador to the Commonwealth of England for the Dutch Republic and commissioner in the Dutch delegation that negotiated the Treaty of Westminster (1654) after the First Anglo-Dutch War.

== Life ==
Nieupoort was the son of Willem Nieupoort, town clerk of Schiedam. He studied Literature in France. He married Anna van Loon, daughter of Hans van Loon, a wealthy V.O.C. bewindhebber (director), in 1637 and had issue.

== Career ==
After he completed his studies in France he became secretary of Albert Joachimi, ambassador of the States-General of the Netherlands at the Court of St James's around 1625. Returned to the Netherlands, he became a member of the Schiedam vroedschap in 1629 and a few years later pensionary of that city. As such he represented the city in the States of Holland and the States-General.

After the death of stadtholder William II, Prince of Orange he played an important role in the States-Party revolution that inaugurated the First Stadtholderless Period in Dutch political history. The States of Holland first sent him to Friesland and Groningen to convince the States of those provinces to take part in the Grote Vergadering (constitutional convention) of 1651 in The Hague. Next they sent him to the States of Zeeland to obtain their support for the proposition of the States of Holland that the office of Captain-General of the States Army had become superfluous. These were both dangerous missions as the three provinces mentioned were still hotbeds of Orangism and as such hostile to the proposals he came to defend.

In 1653, after the First Anglo-Dutch War, he was selected as one of the ambassadors that were sent to the Commonwealth to negotiate peace with Lord Protector Oliver Cromwell, together with his colleague form Holland, Hieronymus van Beverningh, the Zeelander Paulus van de Perre, and the Frisian Allart Pieter van Jongestall. As a confidant of Grand Pensionary Johan de Witt he played a leading role in the Dutch embassy, together with Beverningh. Both acted under secret instructions of De Witt, of which the other two members of the delegation were unaware. They negotiated the secret annex to the Treaty of Westminster (1654) that required the passing of the Act of Seclusion by the States of Holland, that the other negotiators opposed. When the secret became public knowledge after the ratification of the treaty and a political crisis ensued, the States of Friesland instigated a public prosecution against Nieupoort and Beverningh for treason. However, both took an oath on their innocence, and the prosecution came to nothing

After the treaty had been concluded Nieupoort remained behind in England as ambassador to the Commonwealth. His special mission was to negotiate a commercial treaty, a maritime treaty to protect neutral shipping in time of war, and to try and repeal, or at least mitigate, the Navigation Act 1651. He did not succeed. In the matter of what has become known as the Second Northern War, in which the Dutch Republic tried to maintain the balance of power in the Baltic area, usually siding with Sweden's opponents, especially Denmark, it was Nieupoort's role to manage the Commonwealth, which had a predilection for the Swedish side. He was successful in keeping the Commonwealth out of the war "on the wrong side" for the Dutch.

After the Restoration of king Charles II of England Nieupoort was recalled by the States-General, as he was deemed to be persona non grata with Charles. He took up his political work in the Republic again. He was not employed in the negotiations of the Treaty of Breda (1667) after the Second Anglo-Dutch War (unlike his colleagues Beverningh and Jongestall).

After the murder of Johan and Cornelis de Witt in August 1672, he was attacked by an Orangist mob in Schiedam and imprisoned, because of his States-Party affiliation. Later, the new stadtholder, William III of Orange relieved him of all his political offices in the ensuing political purge.

He lived his last years as a private citizen. He died on 2, May 1678 in The Hague.
