= Rampjaar =

1672 in Dutch history

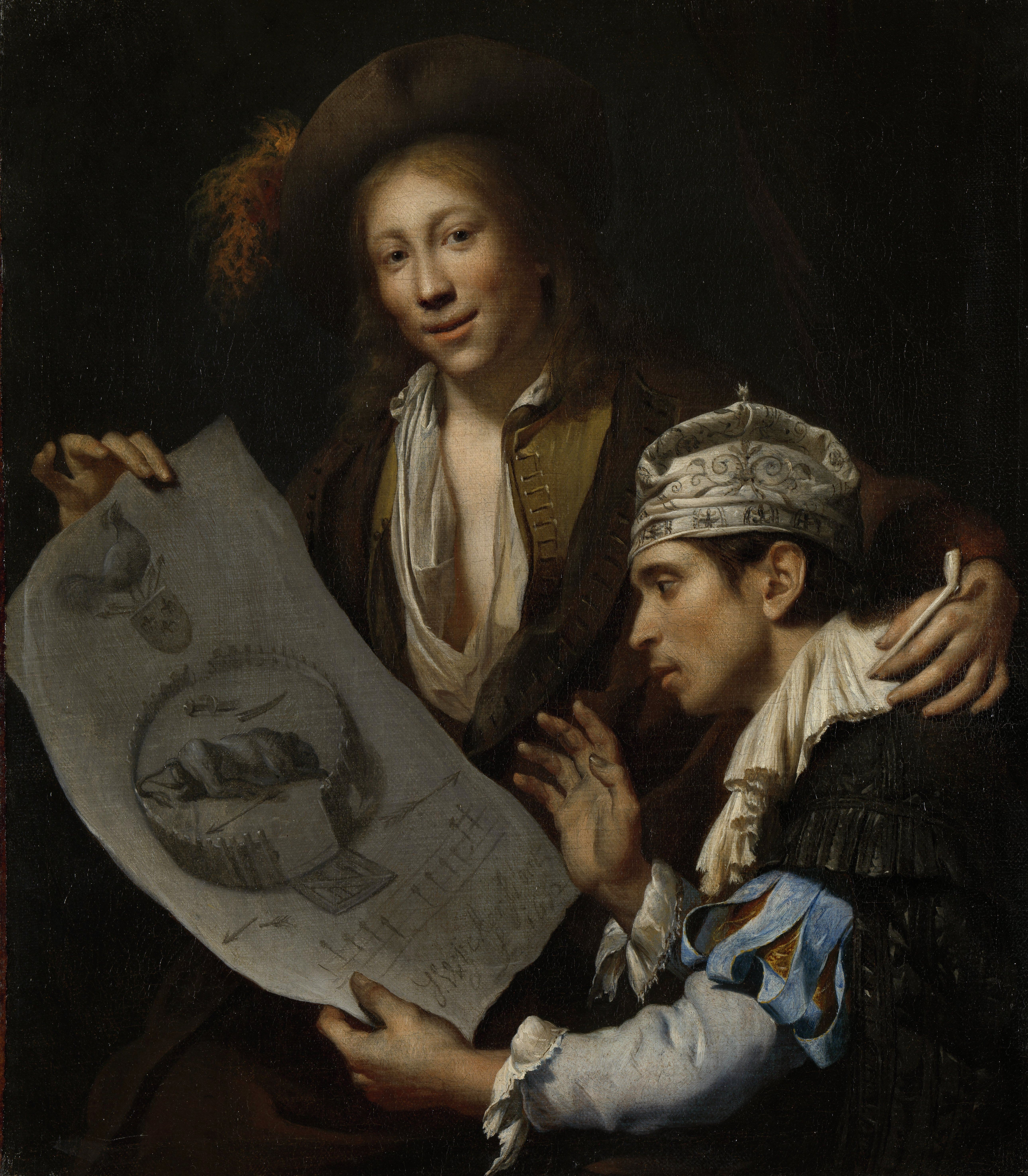
Allegory on the French Invasion of 1672 by Jan van Wijckersloot (1673) (Note: In this allegorical painting, a young Orangist shows a regent, wearing a nightcap, an allegorical drawing. In this drawing, the Dutch lion is pictured inside a Dutch garden or "Hollandic Yard", a traditional symbol for the safety and integrity of the province of Holland adorning many of its public buildings. The lion is presented as weak and defenseless, his seven arrows (representing the provinces) dispersed and sword broken, while the fence surrounding the yard has already been broken down. At the top of the drawing, a French cock, perched atop three fleurs-de-lis and four conquered arrows crows triumphantly. The lesson is that the regents should have listened to the Orangists' concerns about the threat of Louis XIV.)

In 1672, the Dutch Republic faced simultaneous invasions from France, England, and the German bishoprics of Münster and Cologne in what became known as the Rampjaar (Dutch: [ˈrɑmpjaːr]; "Disaster Year"). The French Royal Army, under Louis XIV, advanced rapidly, capturing large areas of the eastern provinces. English and French warships worked together to challenge Dutch control at sea. Meanwhile, troops from Münster and Cologne pressed into the republic from the east. Many Dutch provinces, including Utrecht and Overijssel, were occupied by foreign armies. The sudden overrunning of most of the country led to widespread panic and unrest within Dutch society.

The government, dominated by Grand Pensionary Johan de Witt and the regenten from Holland, lost support as people became dissatisfied with their leadership in the crisis. In response to public demand, Willem III of Orange was appointed stadtholder and also took command of the army. Despite initial setbacks and territorial losses, the Dutch flooded parts of their own land by opening the Hollandic Water Line, which forced the French army to halt its advance on the main Holland province, home to major cities like Amsterdam and Rotterdam. Naval actions eventually prevented an effective Anglo-French blockade, keeping key trading cities supplied. The Dutch army began a gradual recovery, seeing some military successes against the invaders by the end of the year. The Rampjaar led to dramatic political changes, widespread social unrest, and violence against de Witt and his supporters, who were blamed for the country's precarious situation. The conflict continued until 1678, but by the following year, most of the lost territory in the Dutch Republic had been retaken.

== Background ==
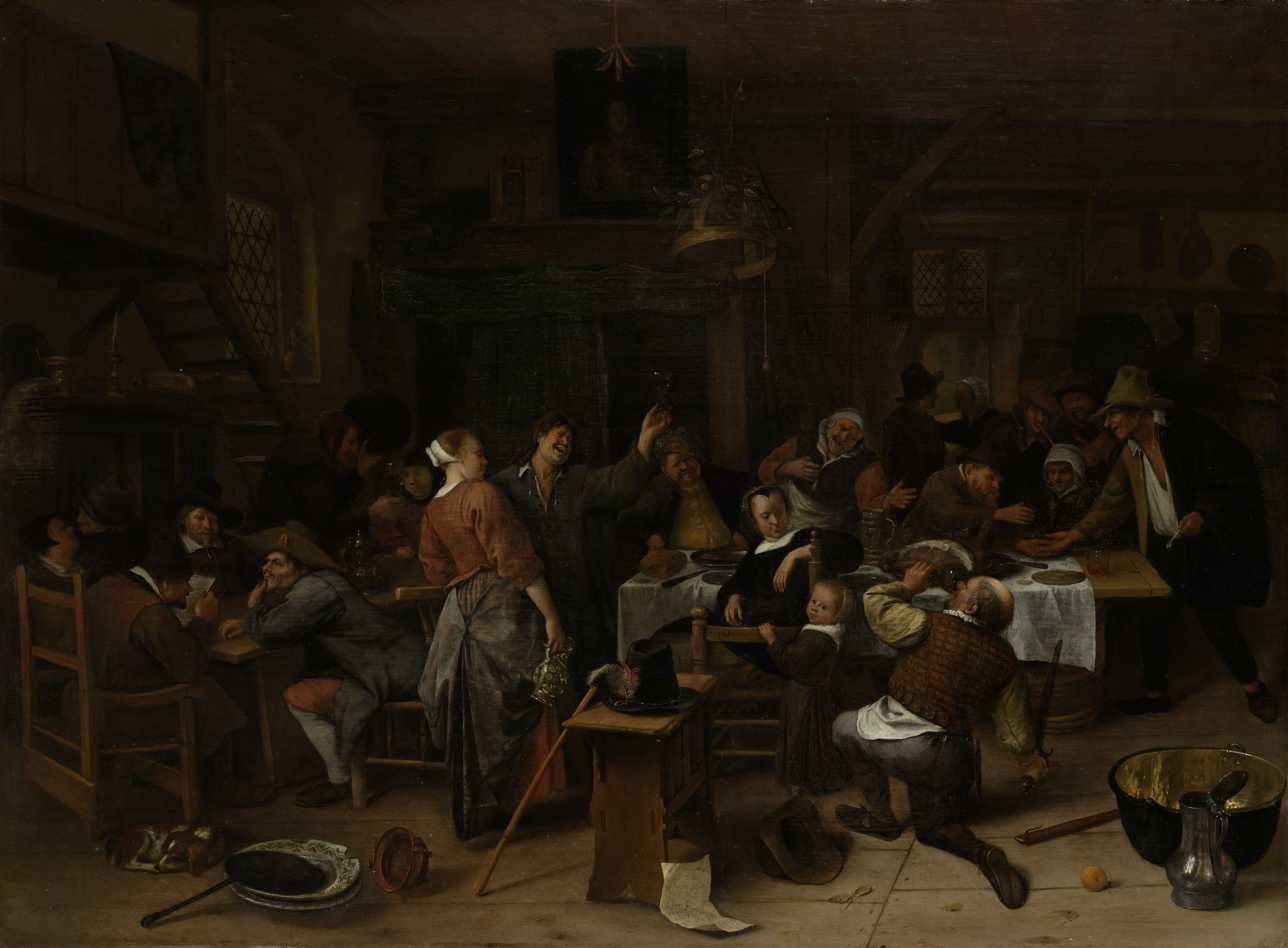
Prince's Day by Jan Steen (ca. 1665): Supporters of the Prince of Orange drink to the health of the Nassau line on the Prince's birthday.

With the Peace of Münster 1648, the seven provinces had won their independence from Spain. Tensions in the provinces between adherents of the government ruled by the burgher oligarchy, called regents, and the Prince of Orange William II culminated in a coup d'état of William. When William II died on 6 November 1650 from smallpox, the republican party came back into power. With the exception of Groningen and the territory of Drente, the provinces agreed not to appoint a new stadtholder. In 1653, Johan de Witt was appointed Grand Pensionary, a de facto head of government. In a secret appendix to the Treaty of Westminster, which ended the First Anglo-Dutch War, de Witt declared that he abolished the office of Stadholder and would never allow the States-General of the Netherlands to appoint a member of the House of Orange to the office of Captain-General.

=== Stuart Restoration and Second Anglo-Dutch War ===
In May 1660, Charles II had ascended the English throne. Since Charles was the uncle of William of Orange the restoration had given new hope for the cause of the House of Orange. Charles supported that cause too but was unwilling to start a fight with the Dutch over the issue. A compromise was made whereby the Dutch agreed to make William a child of the state and pay for his education. Despite diplomatic efforts in 1660 and the personal connection through William of Orange, tensions between England and the Netherlands intensified that eventually led to war. Although the Dutch had won a series of victories they came to terms with the English due to the threat posed by France. With the Oranges held in check by a Perpetual Edict abolishing the stadholderate Johan de Witt allied with England and Sweden, forming the Triple Alliance against France.

=== Road to War ===
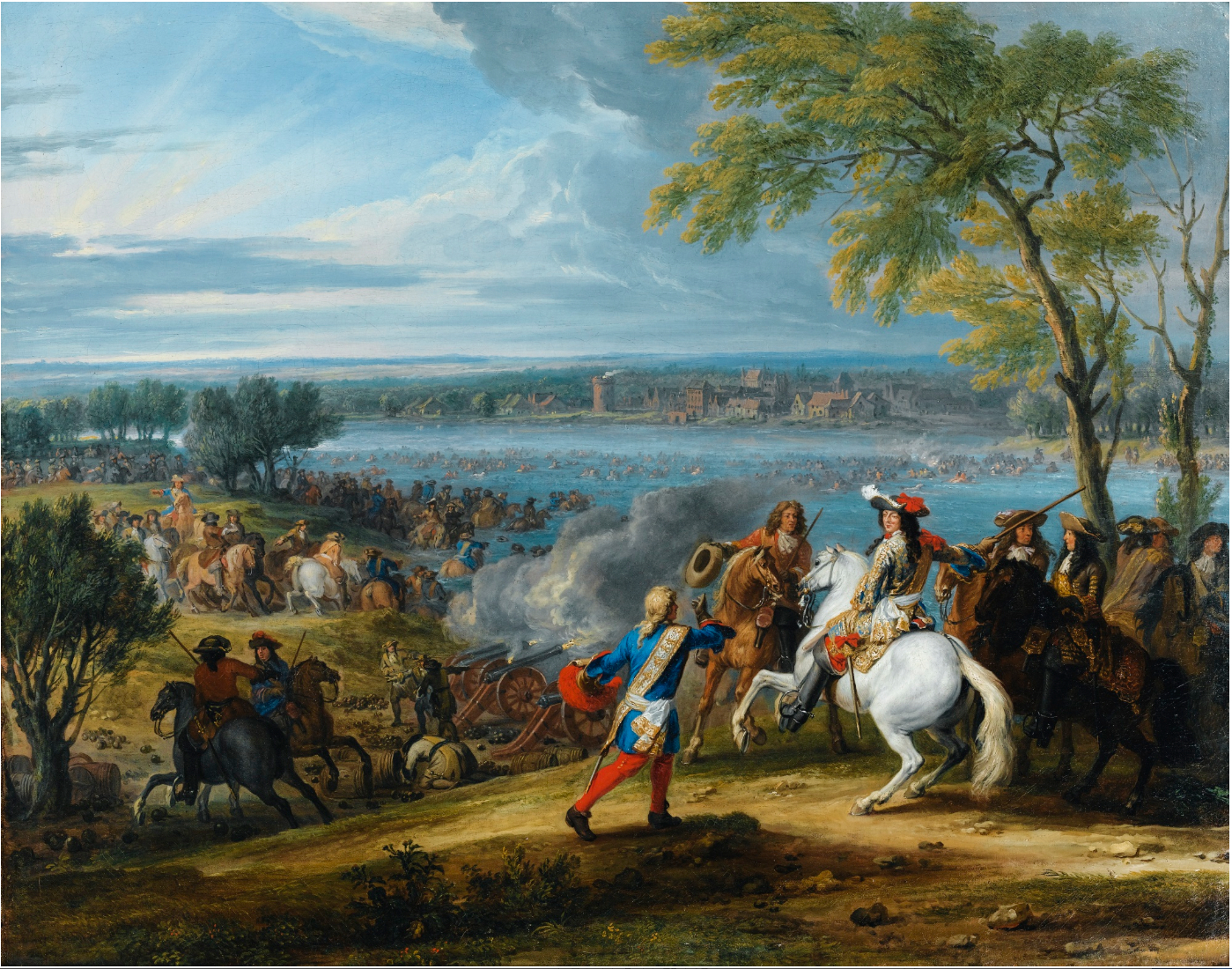
Louis XIV crossing the Rhine by Adam Frans van der Meulen.

With the Treaty of Aix-la-Chapelle the war between France and Spain had come to an end. Louis XIV felt betrayed by the Dutch his former ally as he considered them as the prime mover against France efforts against the Spanish. Facing three Protestant powers against him Louis started secret negotiations with Charles II promising £150,000 p.a. and further £225,000 during war. At the beginning of June 1670, France and England signed the secret Treaty of Dover.

The Dutch were aware that negotiations between England and France were going on, but specific details were not known. Johan de Witt counted on the unpopularity among the English public of a war with a fellow Protestant nation and tried to improve relations with the French. The discussion on the issue of the Spanish Netherlands, however, yielded no consensus between the two countries. France saw the Rhine as its natural border and between France and the Rhine lay the Spanish Netherlands and the Dutch Generality Lands.

During the period leading up to the conflict with England and France, de Witt sought to replace lost allies from the Triple Alliance. With England gone Sweden remained his last ally. The connection with Sweden proved challenging, as Sweden's interest was mainly financial, and their allegiance fluctuated depending on which side could offer greater subsidies. Diplomatic staff changes further reduced Dutch influence in Stockholm, with Pomponne's presence signaling France's intentions to shift Sweden away from Dutch interests. De Witt sent William van Haren, despite his personal opposition to de Witt, to counteract French maneuvers. The Dutch efforts failed to persuade Sweden as desired, and by early 1672 Sweden entered neutrality in a treaty with France.

With Elector Frederick William of Brandenburg, the Dutch faced additional obstacles. Brandenburg also desired subsidies and held longstanding grievances against the Dutch government. Although tempted by French offers, Frederick William was cautious about joining France, as a strong defeat of the Dutch could threaten both his religion and independence. He initially agreed only to mediate. However, as war approached, he informed the Dutch that he preferred alignment with them. De Witt assigned Adrian Godard Reede, an experienced diplomat, to negotiate with Brandenburg. French efforts concentrating on Sweden allowed the Dutch to offer the elector both monetary support and discussion about the eventual return of occupied towns. Frederick William, prompted in part by encouragement from Emperor Leopold, agreed to provide military assistance to the Dutch after the French declaration of war, though he gave no assurance of the return of Rhenish territories.

Relations with Spain remained defined by mistrust and historic enmity, but the shared threat posed by France made cooperation more likely. Difficulties persisted, but eventually Spain agreed to break with France in case of an attack on the Dutch. De Witt reciprocated by promising help for the Spanish Netherlands and refusing to make peace with France without Spain's consent. This understanding soon became a formal treaty in December 1671. De Witt also briefly considered seeking the support of Bishop Galen of Münster, but Galen's existing hostility led him to side with France. No attempt was made with the elector of Cologne, who already collaborated with France.

The army of the States General was in poor condition due to the two wars with England and financial cutbacks. With war becoming more and more likely, pressure increased on the Dutch government to appoint William III, who had not yet come of age, to the office of Captain-General. In November de Witt agreed to appoint William as Captain-General for the duration of a single war campaign. William refused this temporary appointment whereupon a compromise was reached appointing William as Captain-General for life as soon as he reached his 23rd birthday.

== War ==
=== March to August ===
The War started on 12 March with an attack on the Dutch Smyrna fleet. A formal declaration of war followed on 27 March. On 6 April France followed suit. On 7 May, a French army of some 53,000 men had assembled at Liège. 10,000 men were left in garrisons blocking the Dutch stronghold of Maastricht, while the rest crossed the Meuse and besieged the Dutch-held Rhine fortress towns of Rheinberg, Rees, Emmerich and Wesel. On 12 June, the French crossed the Lower Rhine into the Betuwe near Schenkenschans and, recrossing the Lower Rhine to outflank the IJssel Line, occupied Arnhem and Zutphen and besieged Nijmwegen. Faced with the risk of being cut off from Holland, William and his troops withdrew through Utrecht to positions behind the Holland Water Line. By releasing the inundations on 22 June, the French advance were brought to a halt. On early July, Overijssel had surrendered to Bernhard von Galen, Prince-Bishop of Münster. He then joined with the Elector of Cologne and the Duke of Luxembourg, advancing towards Groningen, where his advance was checked.

Following the attack on the Smyrna fleet the Dutch had increased the strength of their fleet up to 60 ships. Still outnumbered by the 75 ships of the combined Anglo-French fleet, the Dutch fleet under Admiral De Ruyter withdrew into shoal waters near the Dutch coast, awaiting an opportunity. When the Allied fleet withdrew to Solebay near Southwold, Suffolk, to resupply, on 7 June De Ruyter attacked them. Although there were only minor ship losses (3 ships on both sides each) the Dutch retained control of their coastal waters, preventing Anglo-French landing in Zeeland.

Stage victory at sea could not compensate for the losses suffered by the Dutch on land, making the seriousness of the situation apparent to all. Orangist pamphlets circulated, directing sharp accusations at the De Witt brothers and the Regent government, claiming they had handed the country over to France. On 14 June, the States of Holland opened negotiations, offering Louis the Generality Landsplus an indemnity of ten million guilders. Louis responded with additional demands including religious freedom for Catholics, the cession of Betuwe, Zwolle, Delfzijl, Grave and Meurs and the indemnity of 24 million guilders. On 22 June, Johan de Witt was severely injured during an attempt on his life. Authorities soon captured Jacob van der Graef, one of the assailants, who was swiftly tried and executed—an event that only fueled public animosity toward the De Witts.

Following the assassination attempt on Johan de Witt, the country's leadership was left vacant. De Witt was unable to resume his duties, and his temporary replacement, Vivien, was limited to fulfilling essential administrative functions. Fagel, the griffier, managed the affairs in The Hague but did not seek nationwide leadership and preferred to see the Prince of Orange take charge. News of de Witt's wounding prompted widespread calls in Holland for William of Orange to be appointed stadholder. The first city to press for William's appointment was Dordrecht, where public unrest forced its municipal government to send a delegation to William, urging him to become stadholder.

William did not initially accept, recalling the negative response to earlier interventions by his family, but ultimately agreed after the delegation expressed fear for their safety if they returned without him. When William arrived in Dordrecht on June 28, his presence calmed the unrest, but the crowd insisted that he be installed as stadholder without delay. William stated he would not accept the role unless released from his oath to uphold the edict by the States of Holland, and returned to his camp. Despite misgivings and under intense pressure, the town magistrates signed the revocation. Similar events occurred in other towns across Holland and Zeeland, where Orangist supporters, often in control of the militia, enforced their demands amid ongoing disturbances.

Unable to suppress the unrest and with the army occupied elsewhere, resistance by local governments quickly diminished. The States of Holland formally repealed the Eternal Edict on July 3 and appointed William III as stadholder of the province, leading to the restoration of order. Once installed, William began by focusing on military and governmental reorganization. Supporters of the previous regime were removed from local governments in a series of administrative changes. The stadholder exercised authority to make appointments in a manner not dependent on traditional elections, citing emergency powers due to the ongoing crisis. William also declined an offer from English envoys to become a sovereign ruler under the protection of the King of England, insisting that he would serve solely as stadholder at the request of the States and would not accept terms dictated by conquest.

=== August to December ===
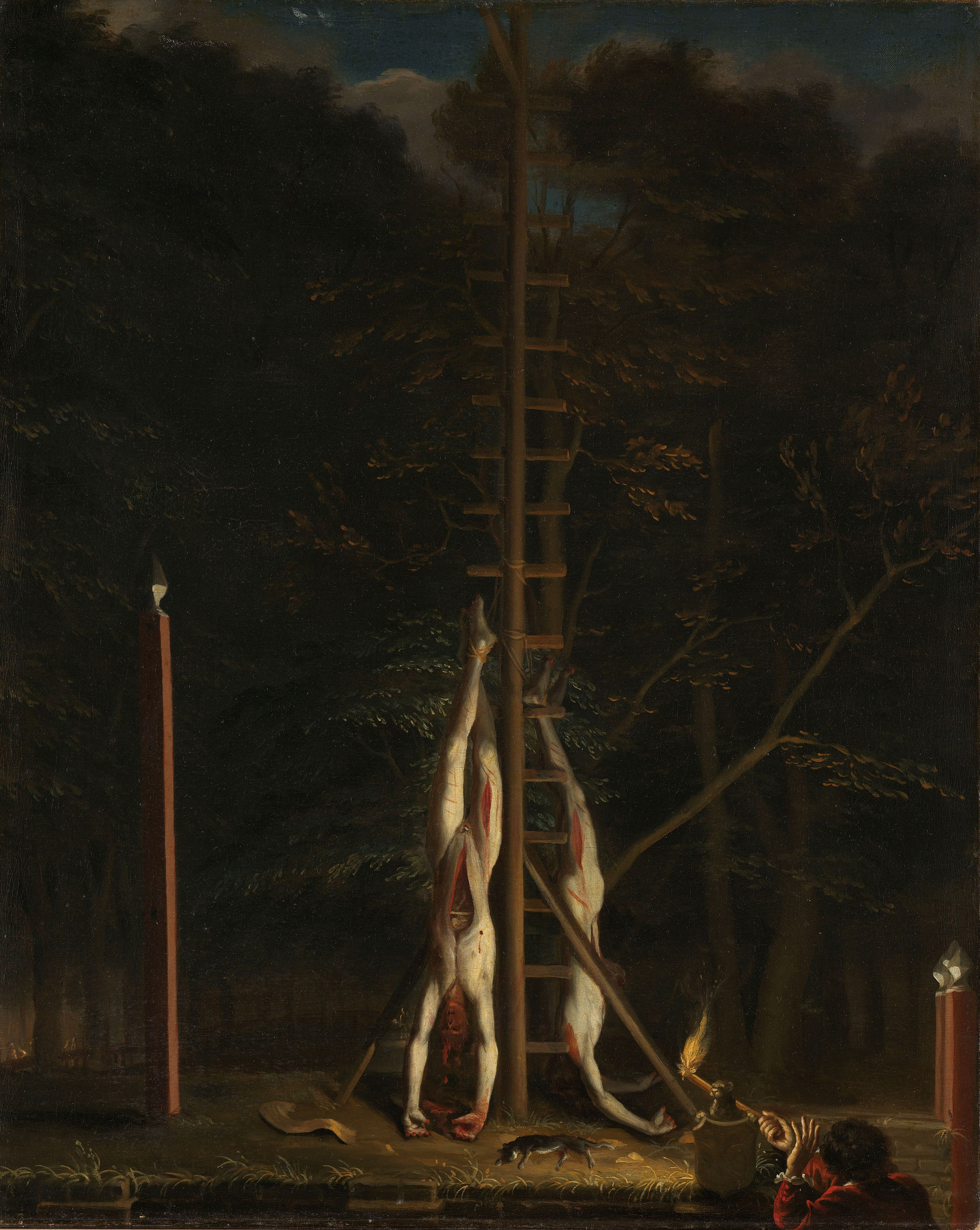
The bodies of the De Witt brothers, by Jan de Baen.

With William now in charge, although Johan had been offered a position as councilor pensionary, he resigned from office on 3 August. Popular sentiment remained unsatisfied and frustrations with the hopeless military situation led to the search for scapegoats. Already in July, Cornelis de Witt, the brother of Johan de Witt, had been imprisoned in The Hague on suspicion of treason and plotting to assassinate William. On 20 August Johan was tricked to come to the prison by a letter that allegedly was from his brother. According to Abraham de Wicquefort the message actually came from Willem Adriaan van Nassau-Odijk, Willem Frederik van Nassau-Zuilestein and Cornelis Tromp supporters of the Orangists. Upon his arrival the prison was stormed by an angry mob, who killed both Johan and his brother.

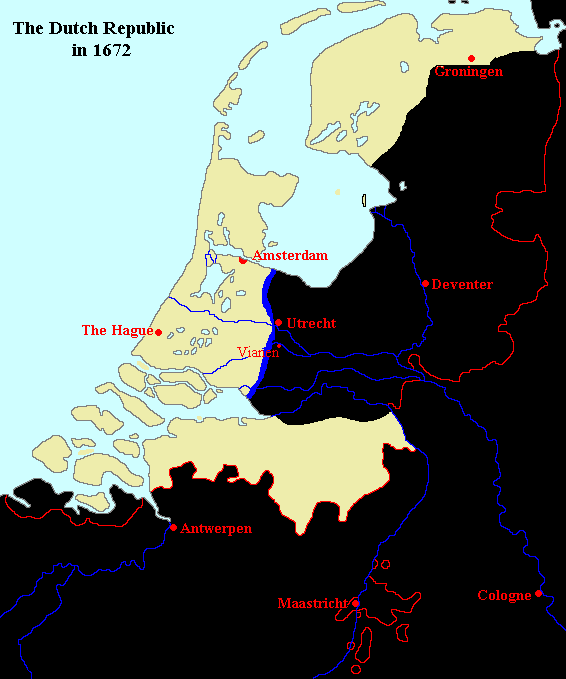
Dutch position in the summer of 1672. Black is the territory held by the French and their allies.

Concerned about the course of the war Germany began to bestir herself against Louis XIV. On 12 September an army of 40,000 under General Raimondo Montecuccoli had assembled at Hildesheim. The plan of the allies was to effect a junction with William and an army of about 20,000 Dutch troops somewhere between the Rhine and Meuse. William III pushed for a swift union with the Brandenburg army and the imperial troops at the Dutch border in order to quickly end the French occupation. The allies moved extremely slowly due to German marching habits and fear of the French general Turenne. Against William's wishes, the imperial command decided to take a long detour south towards Koblenz to avoid a direct confrontation with France and its allies. As diplomatic efforts with his allies failed, William III pursued his own offensive plans. Despite great determination, both his attacks on Naarden and Woerden failed.

After recent setbacks, William began collaborating with the advancing allies. On 16 October, it was decided to lead a Dutch force through the Spanish Netherlands toward the Meuse valley to join with Brandenburg and Imperial troops. The strategy depended on these allies successfully crossing the Rhine and thereby threatening the French lines of communication along the Meuse. Should the Imperial forces manage to cross undetected by Turenne, the French flank would become vulnerable, potentially isolating Turenne and allowing William and the Elector of Brandenburg to advance toward France if they wished.

In the Meuse valley, Maastricht remained under Dutch control, although nearby strongholds such as Valkenburg, Tongeren, and Maaseik were occupied by the French. For the plan to succeed, it was necessary to move an army of at least 20,000 men out of Holland. William considered the risks acceptable for several reasons: the absence of Turenne and Condé from the local front had eased military pressure on Holland and the Betuwe; the morale of the Dutch soldiers had notably improved since the summer, as shown in the recent action at Woerden; and with the support of defensive flooding and the leadership of John Maurice and Wirtz, William believed home defences would be secure during his absence.

By late autumn, William judged the Dutch soldiers to be more reliable than earlier in the year, supported by recent defensive successes and the presence of effective commanders. Confident in the security provided by inundations and his appointed leaders, he assembled a fast-moving cavalry force at Rozendaal in early November. His goal was to advance quickly across the Spanish Netherlands to the Meuse valley, aiming to defeat French positions and meet up with Brandenburg and Imperial troops.

Although the allied forces eventually crossed the Rhine at Weissenau, Turenne managed to prevent them from linking with William, forcing them to withdraw and retaliate in neighboring territories. Facing limited time before expected winter frosts, he attempted to capture Charleroi, aiming to disrupt French communications. The siege, begun mid-December, was unsuccessful due to the cold, logistical delays, and relief efforts by French commanders. William withdrew, destroying fortifications at Binch en route to Holland.

On 29 December William had learned that the floods had frozen and Luxembourg had moved to attack The Hague. As the French advanced, Koningsmarck abandoned Bodegraven, retreating toward Leiden, contrary to some of his instructions. Confusion and lack of coordination among deputies and junior officers weakened the defense. A series of decisions led to a poorly executed withdrawal, leaving key positions largely undefended and allowing French forces to seize strategic routes without resistance. French troops, facing no opposition, destroyed Bodegraven and killed many inhabitants before retreating as thaw began. William returned to the area, assessed the damage, and considered renewed operations if conditions permitted, but fluctuating weather prevented further major attacks.

== Effects ==
The War demonstrated to them that the French king controlled European relations and that their kingdom could no longer ensure its security without allies. William III firmly believed that the French monarch intended to establish both a universal monarchy and the Catholic faith throughout Europe. Therefore, in order to ensure the security of everyone's liberties, France had to be restrained. William pursued a staunch anti-French foreign policy for the remainder of his life. The Stadtholder-King, as he would become after his daring invasion of England in 1688, unleashed two lengthy wars against France, committing the Dutch Republic to war until 1713. The Dutch economy never fully recovered from the severe crisis, although the Dutch Golden Age is sometimes said to have continued until the end of the century. The art market was as severely affected. For example Johannes Vermeer went bankrupt as there were no more buyers.

== See also ==
- Annus horribilis
- Amerongen Castle, castle burnt by the French in 1673
- List of areas in the Dutch Republic destroyed or damaged during the Franco-Dutch War

== Bibliography ==
- Babuscio, Jack (1984). European Political Facts, 1648–1789. New York: Facts on File. ISBN 0-8719-6992-0.
- Van Der Zee, Henri; Van Der Zee, Barbara (1988). William and Mary. London: Penguin. ISBN 978-01401-0691-6.
- Rowen, Herbert H. (1986). John de Witt, Statesman of the "True Freedom". Cambridge: Cambridge University Press. ISBN 0-5213-0391-5.
- Herman, Arthur (2004). To Rule the Waves : How the British Navy shaped the Modern World. New York: HarperCollins. ISBN 0-0605-3424-9.
- Israel, J. I. (1995). The Dutch Republic: Its Rise, Greatness, and Fall 1477–1806. Oxford: Clarendon Press. ISBN 0-19-820734-4.
- de Haan, Jaap (2024). De erste minister van de Republiek - De Hollandse Raadpensionaris in de Zeventiende Eeuw (in Dutch). Amsterdam: Amsterdam University Press. ISBN 978-94-6372-209-4.
- Hutton, Ronald (1989). Charles the Second, King of England, Scotland, and Ireland. Oxford: Clarendon Press. ISBN 0-1982-2911-9.
- Kossmann, E. H.; et al. (The New Cambridge Modern History) (2008). "The Dutch Republic". In F. L. Carsten (ed.). The Ascendancy of France 1648-88. Vol. V. ISBN 978-1139-05580-2.
- Levi, Anthony (2004). Louis XIV. New York: Carroll & Graf. ISBN 0-7867-1309-7.
- Padfield, Peter (2000). Maritime Supremacy & the Opening of the Western mind: Naval campaigns that shaped the Modern World. New York: Overlook. ISBN 1-5856-7002-2.
- Peter, Heinrich (1870). Der Krieg des Grossen Kurfürsten gegen Frankreich:1672-1675 (in German). Halle: Verlag der Buchhandlung des Waisenhauses.
- Prud'homme van Reine, Ronald Boudewijn (2001). Schittering en schandaal: Biografie van Maerten en Cornelis Tromp (in Dutch). Amsterdam: Arbeiderspers. ISBN 9-0295-3572-5.
- Prak, Maarten Roy (2005). The Dutch Republic in the Seventeenth Century: the Golden Age. Cambridge: Cambridge University Press. ISBN 0-5218-4352-9.
- Robb, Nesca A. (1963). William of Orange : A Personal Portrait. New York: St. Martin's Press.
- Royal Historical Society, ed. (1990). Camden miscellany XXX. Vol. XXXIX. London: Butler and Tanner.
- van der Sman, Marie Christine; et al. (Dutch Society in the Age of Vermeer) (1996). The Year of Disaster:1672. Zwolle: Waanders. ISBN 9-0400-9823-9.
- Trevelyan, Mary Caroline (1930). William the Third. London: Longmans, Green & co.
- Troost, Wouter (2005). William III the Stadholder-king: A Political Biography. Routledge. ISBN 978-0-7546-5071-3.
- der Weduwen, Arthur (2023). State Communication and Public Politics in the Dutch Golden Age. Oxford: Oxford University Press. ISBN 978-0-19-726743-1.
