= Allart Pieter van Jongestall =

Dutch jurist and diplomat

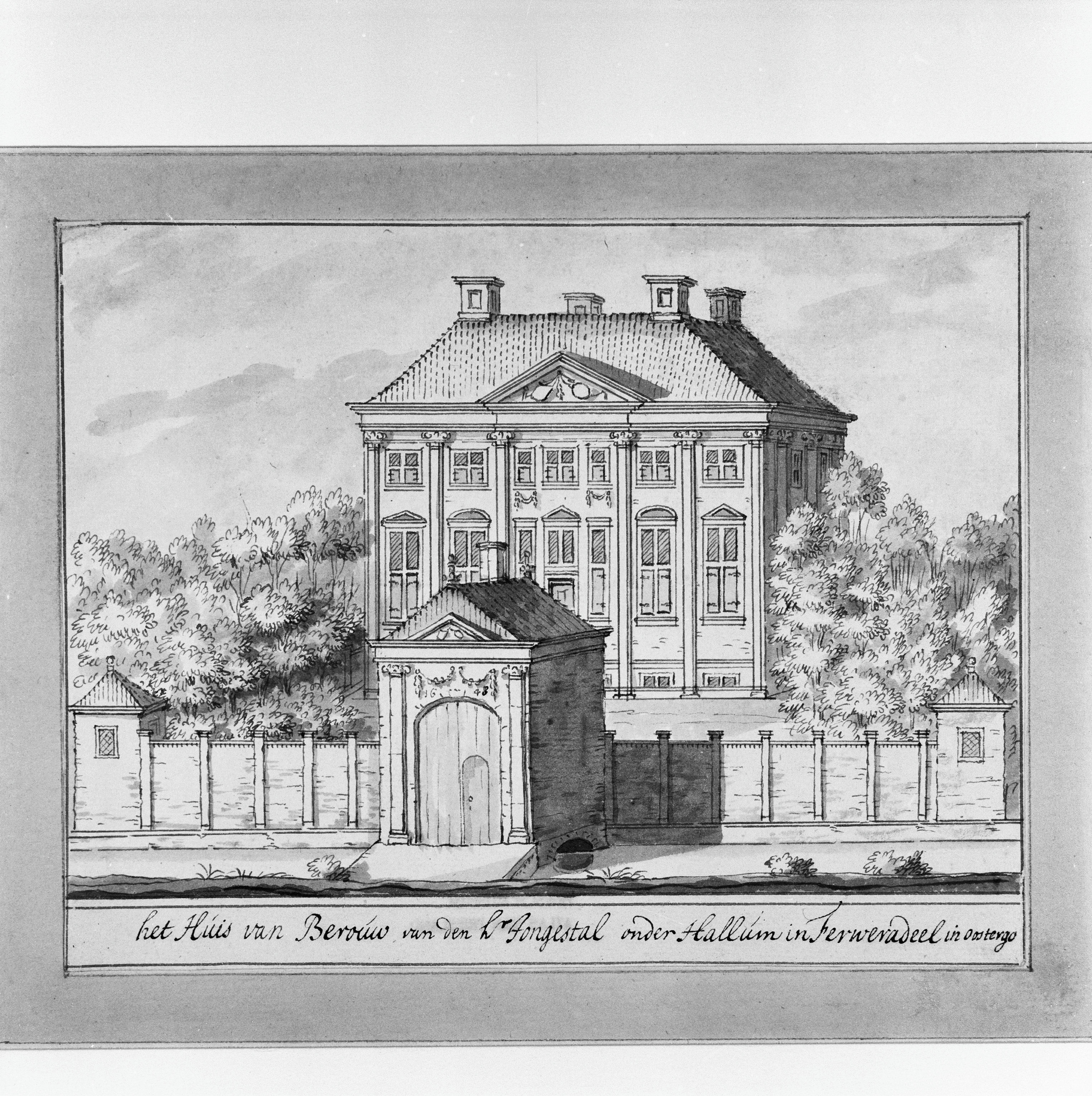
Drawing of Jongestall State or Hûs fan Berou in Hallum where Jongestall lived

Allart Pieter van Jongestall, also spelled Allard Pieter van Jongestal (12 August 1612 in Stavoren – 9 November 1676 in Hallum) was a Dutch jurist and diplomat. He was president of the Hof van Friesland (High Court of the province of Friesland) and represented the States-General of the Dutch Republic in the negotiations of the Treaty of Westminster (1654) and the Treaty of Breda (1667) which ended the first two Anglo-Dutch Wars.

== Life ==
Jongestall was born Pieter van Jongestall, the son of Wijbrand van Jongestall (a schepen, or burgemeester of his native Stavoren, and a member of the Admiralty board of Friesland). His mother's maiden name was Viersen. He studied Roman-Dutch law and Literature at the University of Franeker between 1631 and 1634. In 1634 he first studied at the University of Leiden and later obtained a Doctor Juris-degree in France.

He married Margaretha van Haren, a sister of the nobleman and ambassador Willem van Haren, in 1639. They had seven children, of whom only four survived him. Notable were his daughter, the poet Sybille. and his son Gellius Wybrandus, Grietman of Hemelumer Oldephaert. The family lived on the Ondersma State (also called Jongestall State) near Hallum.

== Career ==
Jongestall started practicing law before the Hof van Friesland (a sister-court of the Hof van Holland) in 1635. He was legally adopted by his uncle Gellius van Jongestall, who was a councilor in the Hof van Friesland, in 1637. At this occasion he received the Christian names "Allart Pieter." When his adoptive father resigned his seat in the Court, Jongestall succeeded him in November 1637. He was appointed president-councilor of the Court on 20 March 1655 and remained in this office until his death in 1676.

In 1644 he represented the States of Friesland in the States-General and in 1651 at the Grote Vergadering (constitutional convention) in The Hague, which introduced the First Stadtholderless Period in the history of the Republic.

In 1653 he was selected to be one of the peace commissioners to negotiate with Lord Protector Oliver Cromwell about the ending of the First Anglo-Dutch War with the Commonwealth of England, together with Paulus van de Perre, Hieronymus van Beverningh and Willem Nieupoort. He was apparently chosen to keep an eye out for the interests of Friesland and its stadtholder William Frederick, Prince of Nassau-Dietz, and especially the stadtholder's nephew, the Prince of Orange, three years old at the time. Jongestall was an Orangist partisan, and as such not trusted by his States-Party colleagues Beverningh and Nieupoort. He apparently also had a cool relationship with Cromwell.

Jongestall was kept out of the secret negotiations between Cromwell and Grand Pensionary Johan de Witt about the Act of Seclusion. He was therefore not aware of the secret annexe to the Treaty of Westminster (1654) which resulted therefrom. This may have convinced him to resign his embassy later in 1654, when the secret became public knowledge and a scandal ensued.

In 1654 king Louis XIV of France knighted him, for diplomatic services rendered in the course of Anglo-French attempts to arrive at closer ties, that would eventually result in the Anglo-French alliance of 1655 and the Anglo-Spanish War (1654–60). Bordeaux, the French ambassador to the Commonwealth at the time, writes in a letter of 23 October 1654 to his colleague in the Hague, Chanut: "I must give this testimony, that during the course of his negotiation he did appear very zealous for the interest of France, and with a great correspondence. I hope you will renew the thanks, which I have already given him."

After the Second Anglo-Dutch War, which the Republic fought with the successor state of the Commonwealth, Jongestall was again selected to be one of the peace commissioners to negotiate with king Charles II of England. These negotiations resulted in the Treaty of Breda (1667). After this diplomatic mission he was apparently not used for later missions.

Jongestall was appointed a regent of the University of Franeker in 1649. In 1673 he was appointed a member of a commission that was charged with the drafting of constitutional amendments for the States of Friesland (the Poincten Reformatoir) by the new stadtholder Hendrik Casimir II.

He died on 9 November 1676. The Franeker professor Michiel Busschius gave his eulogy, and the poet Ernestus Baders wrote an allocutio funebris:

Liligerum pridem cui Regia sceptra dedere
Nomina pro meritis splendidiora suis
Facundasque fuit mirata Britannia voces
Attonitis Tamesis dum stetit amnis aquis
Bredaque quem stupuit pro Libertate loquentem
Belgaque quo forti Vindice liber ovat

Which may be translated as:

Both the Lys-bearing (king) whose regal sceptres used to apply

More splendid names for his merits;
And admiring Britain (that) made eloquent speeches
While he stood (by) the frenzied waters of the river Thames;
And Breda that he has amazed speaking for freedom;

And the Dutchman (all) freely applaud the strong winner.

== Coat of arms ==
Argent, tree Vert with fleurs de lis Or, in dexter base a hound Gules its dexter forepaw resting on the tree, and in sinister base a hart Gules its sinister forepaw also resting on the tree.
