= Peter Julius Coyet =

Swedish envoy to England

Peter Julius Coyet (1618–1667), was a prominent Swedish envoy to England during the time of Oliver Cromwell.

== Biography ==
He was born in Stockholm as the son of Gillis Coyet and the brother of Otto and Frederick Coyett; the family was of Flemish origin. He grew up in Falun, but in 1629 his father moved to Moscow and settled there as a goldsmith and master of the Mint. In 1634 his father died. Peter was sent to Amsterdam, attended lessons at the Athenaeum Illustre and moved to Leiden in 1637 to study at the university. He returned to Sweden in 1642 and was appointed as secretary in the chancellery. In 1647 he was sent to Moscow in an embassy. He probably assisted Queen Christina where to bind or buy books from Dutch booksellers. Like his brother - the first Swede to travel to Japan and China - Coyet was knighted in 1649, and in December 1654–May 1656 he was sent as an envoy in England. In July 1655 Crister Bonde arrived as ambassador to England and both dealt with Bulstrode Whitelocke on using Swedish ports, but their negotiations during the Second Northern War about the English trade in the Baltic and with Russia seems to have been unsuccessful, although he was knighted by Oliver Cromwell the Lord Protector in 1656.

In 1657 he was appointed State Secretary of Sweden and reassigned to Holland to deal with Coenraad van Beuningen and Johan de Witt. He was involved in the Treaty of Roskilde. He also negotiated the breach of the peace with Denmark in the summer of 1658.. Shortly afterwards he was sent again to the Dutch Republic to persuade the Dutch not to supply weapons to the Swedish enemy, Denmark. In 1660 he met in the Hague with Charles II of England. In 1667 he was involved in the Treaty of Breda between the English and the Dutch, where he died within a few weeks. His remains were sent to Stockholm.

== Family ==
Coyet was married twice, in 1645 and in 1649; he was wealthy and left behind many estates, farms, books, letters and nine children. One of them was Wilhelm Julius Coyet (1647–1709).
