= Paulus van de Perre =

Dutch politician and diplomat

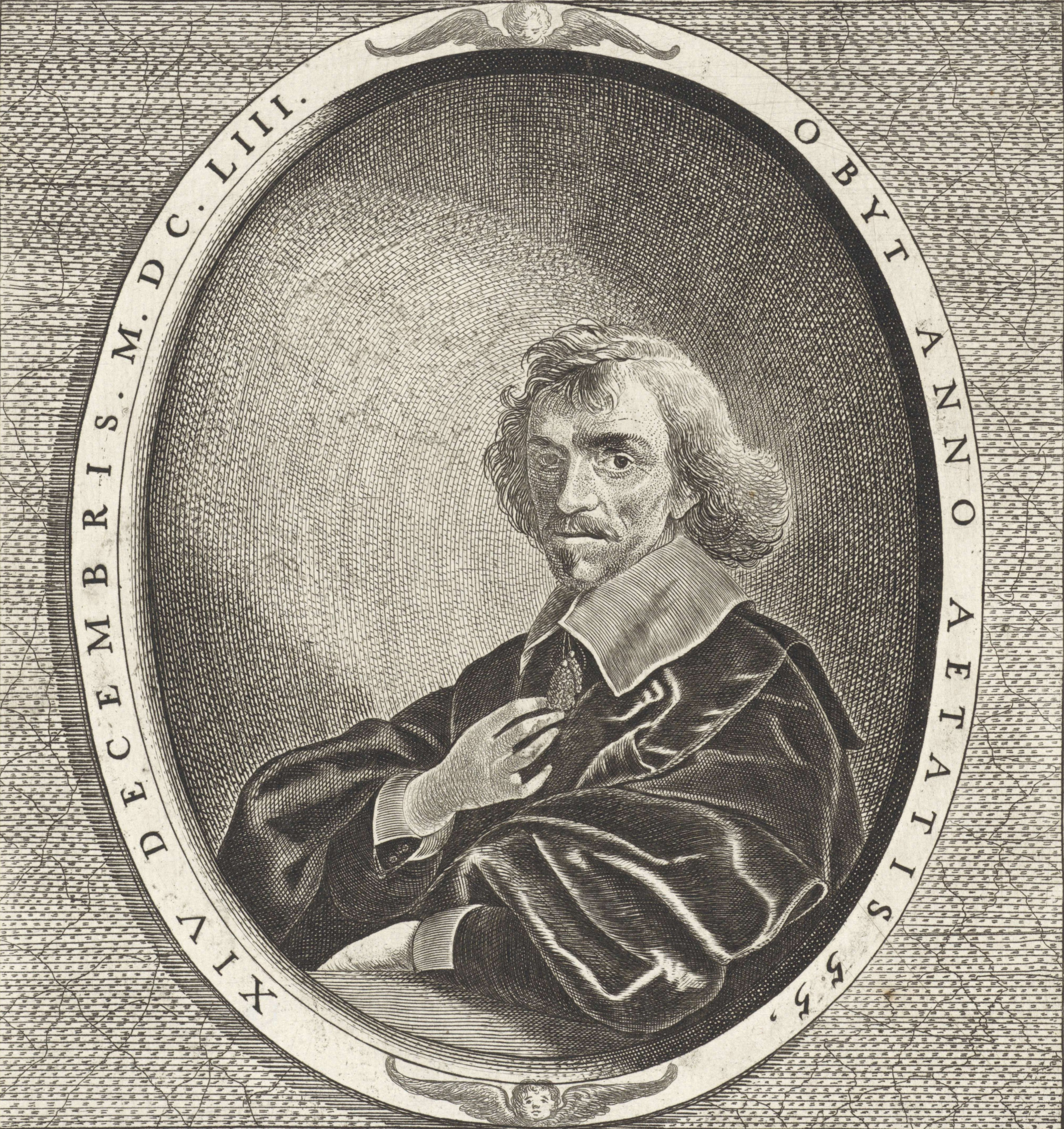
- Portrait of Paulus van der Perre by Karel Slabbaert
- Born: 1598; Middelburg
- Died: 14 December 1653 (aged 54–55); London

Paulus van de Perre (Middelburg?, 1598? – London, 14 December 1653) was a Dutch politician and diplomat. He was one of the Dutch envoys who negotiated the Treaty of Westminster (1654) for the Dutch Republic with Lord Protector Oliver Cromwell.

== Biography ==
Van de Perre was a son of Adriaan van de Perre and Adriana Dircx Hayman. His birthplace and year of birth are uncertain. He spent most of his life in Middelburg, the capital of the province of Zeeland in the Dutch Republic. He was married to Clara Teelinck, with whom he had a son and two daughters.

He occupied a number of municipal offices: schepen, burgemeester, and pensionary. He represented the city in the States of Zeeland and the States-General of the Netherlands. In 1652 he was a regent of the Latin school in Middelburg.

Van de Perre (who had received a law degree) is best remembered for his role as a diplomat in the relations of the Dutch Republic with the Commonwealth of England around the First Anglo-Dutch War. In 1651 he, together with Jacob Cats and Gerard Pietersz. Schaep, was sent to England to negotiate with the government of the Commonwealth about the renewal of a commercial treaty of 1496, the repeal of the first Navigation Act, and a number of other points of friction. These negotiations came to nothing and were broken off on 10 July 1652, after the First Anglo-Dutch War had already broken out with the naval incident between admirals Maarten Tromp and Blake on 29 May (all dates New Style).

When the two governments decided to open peace negotiations in 1653, Van de Perre was again made part of the Dutch delegation, representing the States of his native Zeeland, together with Hieronymus van Beverningh and Willem Nieupoort for the States of Holland and Allart Pieter van Jongestall for the States of Friesland. They left on the ship "Den Swarten Arendt" (captain Anthony Post) and arrived in London on 30 June 1653 . In the negotiations Van de Perre was a champion for the cause of the Prince of Orange and the Dutch West India Company (W.I.C.), unlike his fellow commissioners from the province of Holland.

Van de Perre suddenly died on 14 December 1653. His corpse was embalmed and sent back to Zeeland on the "St. Peter" (captain Peter Davernett) in the last days of December 1653, with a special passport to be allowed through the English blockade of the Dutch coast. He was buried in the Old Saint Peter's Church in Middelburg. His tomb displays his family coat-of-arms.
