= Act of Seclusion =

1654 act of the States of Holland

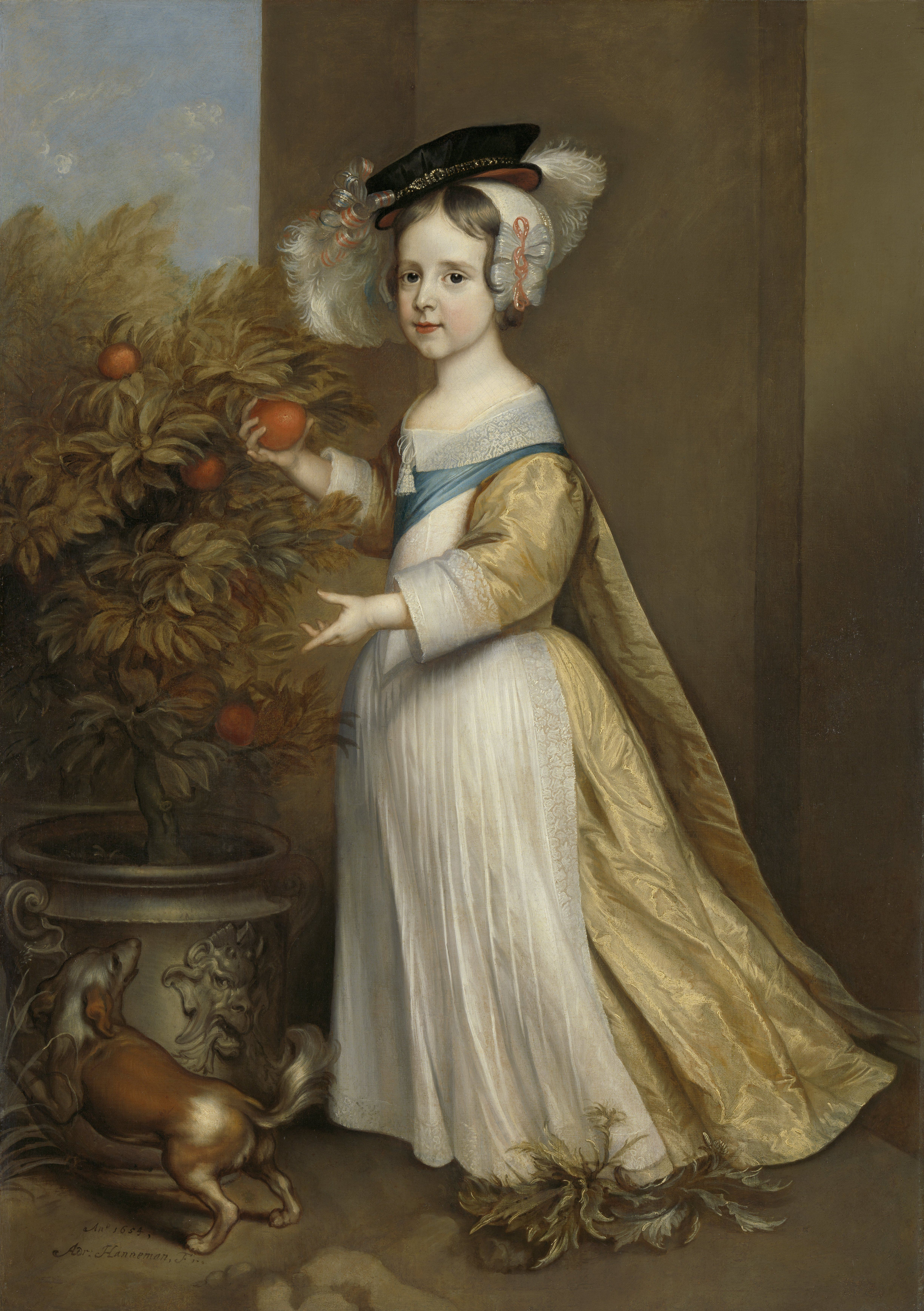
William III, Prince of Orange at age four in 1654 by Adriaen Hanneman

The Act of Seclusion was an Act of the States of Holland, required by a secret annex in the Treaty of Westminster (1654) between the United Provinces and the Commonwealth of England in which William III, Prince of Orange, was excluded from the office of Stadtholder.

== Background ==
The First Stadtholderless Period had been heralded in January 1651 by States Party Regenten, among whom the republican-minded brothers Cornelis and Andries de Graeff and their cousins Andries and Cornelis Bicker, during the Grote Vergadering (Great Assembly) in The Hague, a meeting of representatives of the States of each of the United Provinces. This meeting was convened after the death of stadtholder William II on November 6, 1650, when the States of Holland decided to leave the office of Stadtholder vacant in their province.

The First Anglo-Dutch War had been a disaster for the Dutch. The subsequent Treaty of Westminster which ended the war meant that the Dutch were forced to give a number of concessions to England. In addition, Johan de Witt, Grand Pensionary of Holland, and Oliver Cromwell ensured that the Orangist regent faction would be much weakened. This strengthened De Witt's party, while English Republicans no longer needed to fear that William III (four years of age at the time) could become a strong Dutch leader who could bring the Stuarts, to whom he was closely related through his mother Mary, Princess Royal and Princess of Orange, back on the English throne.

== Act enforcement ==
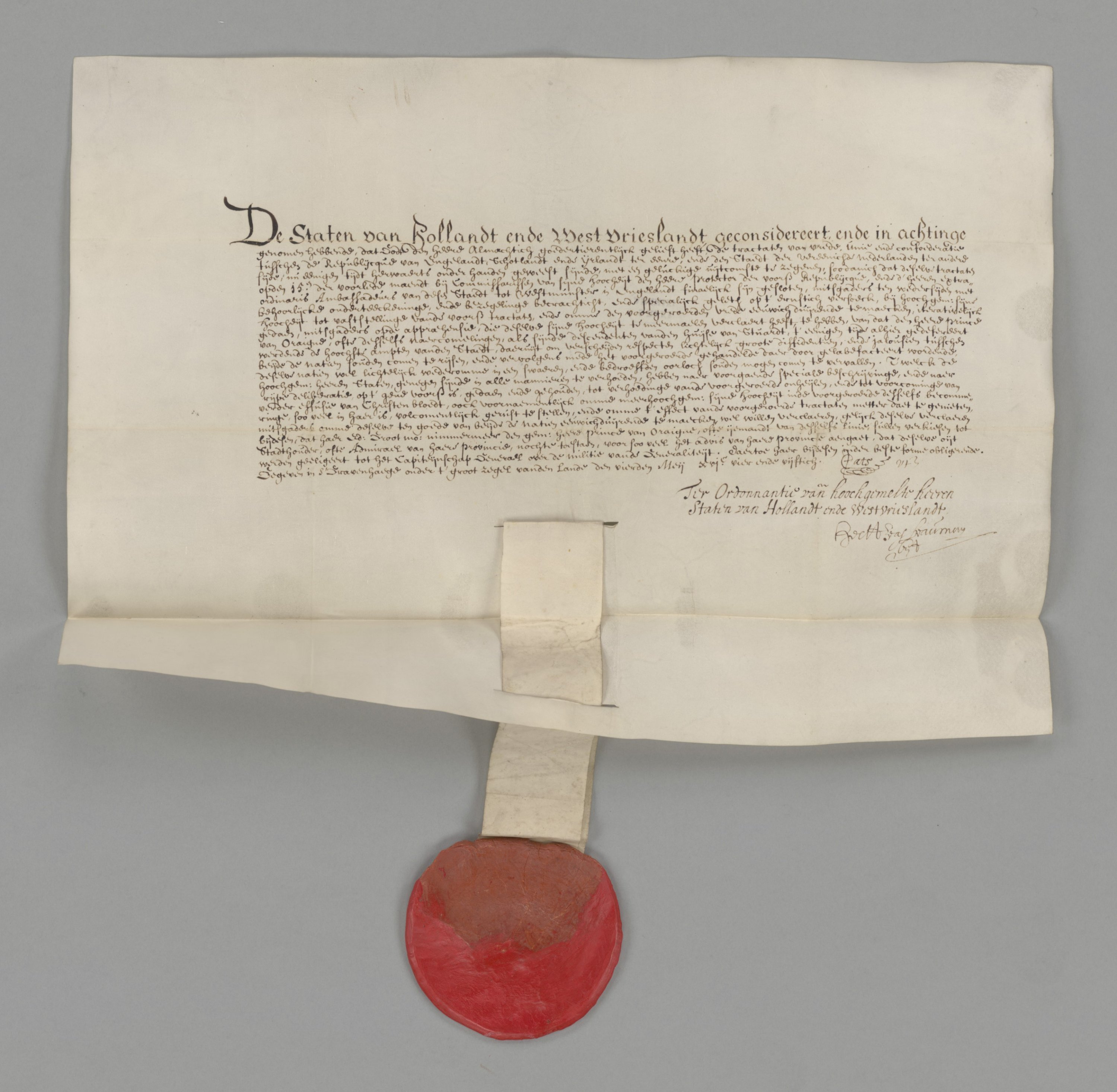
Act of Seclusion

As the other provinces would have refused to sign the treaty if they had known of the secret clause, De Witt arranged that this clause would bind only the States of Holland. The States-General of the Netherlands were completely left in the dark, as was the Frisian plenipotentiary at the negotiations, Allart Pieter van Jongestall. Only the two Holland representatives (Hieronymus van Beverningh and Willem Nieupoort) were in on the secret. Consequently, the States-General ratified the treaty on April 22, 1654, without the secret annex.

The prime movers behind the Act of Seclusion, in which William III, Prince of Orange was excluded from the office of Stadtholder, were De Witt and his uncle Cornelis de Graeff. Then, the States of Holland debated the Act and passed it on May 4, 1654, over the opposition of the Holland ridderschap (delegates of the nobility, who together had one vote in the States) and six of the cities (among which Haarlem, Leyden, Edam and Enkhuizen with one vote each). Only then did Oliver Cromwell, the English signatory to the treaty, ratify the treaty (including the secret clause), as had been agreed beforehand.

De Witt, managed to have the act ratified only with the greatest effort. The Gedeputeerde Staten (Delegated States) of Friesland (executive of the States of Friesland) even demanded that the conduct of the Dutch plenipotentiaries be investigated.

== Aftermath ==
When the Act of Seclusion shortly afterward was leaked by De Witt's clerk Van Messem, it was commonly assumed that De Witt masterminded it himself. In the 19th century, investigation of his secret correspondence appeared to show otherwise. Nowadays, different positions are taken in this matter stemming from the suspicion that De Witt may have manipulated the writings out of fear that they might fall into the wrong hands.

When the English Restoration brought Charles II to the throne of England, the States of Holland declared that the Act of Seclusion had thereby lost its validity since the Act had been concluded with the Commonwealth, which had ceased to exist.

In 1667, De Witt and his partisans permanently barred the House of Orange from influence by the Perpetual Edict. However, in 1672, the States of Holland revoked the Edict and made William of Orange Stadtholder.

Ironically, William III would later drive out the Stuart King James II during the Glorious Revolution and thereby end moves in England towards absolutism.
