= Treaty of Westminster (1654) =

1654 treaty between England and Dutch Republic

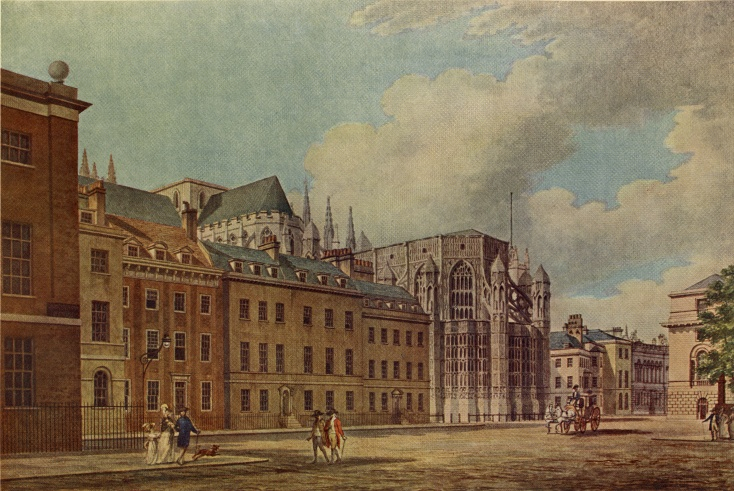
- Old Palace Yard, Westminster Palace, by Thomas Malton
- Type: Peace treaty
- Signed: 5/15 April 1654
- Location: Westminster
- Sealed: 19/29 April 1654
- Effective: 19/29 April 1654
- Expiration: 1660 (Note: The treaty was deemed expired with the English Restoration in 1660.)
- Signatories: Lord Protector Oliver Cromwell; States General of the Netherlands
- Language: Latin

The Treaty of Westminster, concluded between the Lord Protector of the English Commonwealth, Oliver Cromwell, and the States General of the United Netherlands, was signed on 5/15 April 1654. The treaty ended the First Anglo-Dutch War (1652–1654). The treaty is otherwise notable because it is one of the first treaties implementing international arbitration as a method of conflict resolution in the early modern era. A secret clause, obliging the States of Holland to enact the Act of Seclusion, played an important part in Dutch internal politics during the First Stadtholderless Period.

== Negotiations ==
The negotiation of the treaty started long before the war. The Commonwealth of England had been established only in 1649, and the new state was seeking international recognition. Older established states, like the Dutch Republic, looked somewhat askance at the "upstart" England, which was ruled by "king killers." The Dutch Republic had actively supported the royalist cause in the English Civil War because of the family ties between the stadtholder William II, Prince of Orange and the English royal family. The death of William II in 1650 and the establishment of a new States Party regime in the Dutch Republic cleared the way for a thaw in Anglo-Dutch diplomatic relations.

=== Proposed union and counter-proposals ===
The negotiations about better relations started in earnest in the Spring of 1651. Walter Strickland and Oliver St John went to The Hague to talk about the removal of the royalist exiles who had sought asylum in the Netherlands (among whom was the pretender Charles Stuart) from the Republic, but more importantly about a political union between the two states, on the ground that they were similar in respect of politics, religion, and commerce. The Dutch government replied with a number of counter-proposals in matters they held dear, like principles of (then-emerging) international law, such as freedom of the seas, limitation of the concept of contraband to "instruments of war", freedom from capture of neutral goods on neutral ships in time of war. These were all matters that the English at the time disputed. Furthermore, the Dutch asked that letters of reprisal (a common practical cause of friction between states) should not be granted in peacetime. Finally, they asked that Dutch merchants should have the same privileges as the English in English dominions in Europe and the Americas. (Note: That demand was motivated by the enactment by Parliament in October 1650 of an Act for Prohibiting trade with the Barbadoes, Virginia, Bermuda, and Antigua, which (though not directed expressly at the Dutch) hindered Dutch trade. See Davenport, p. 8) The demands, collected in 36 draft-articles, were presented to the English ambassadors on 14/24 June 1651. They returned to England without an agreement having been reached.

On 9/19 October 1651 the Commonwealth Parliament enacted the first of the Navigation Acts, which was perceived as aimed at the ruination of Dutch commerce, (Note: This danger has often been overestimated. Though it represented a serious blow, the Act did not fundamentally endanger the Dutch trading system. See Economic history of the Netherlands (1500–1815). England was a relatively minor market for the Dutch economy in comparison with the Baltic, France and Spain. One might add that the restrictions on competition embodied in the Act also harmed the English economy, especially English consumers, and producers in the Caribbean and American colonies.) possibly on the instigation of St. John, who was aggrieved by his cool treatment in The Hague. This motivated the Dutch government to send a delegation of three commissioners: Cats, Van de Perre, and Schaep to London to reopen the negotiations about the 36 articles, and to gain suspension of the Navigation Act till the negotiations would have been completed. The latter demand was immediately rejected by the English Council of State, and the English negotiators upped the ante by formulating additional demands: reparations for alleged injuries to English commerce in Greenland, Brazil and the East Indies, and free access for the English E.I.C. to the East Indies (which had effectively been blocked by its Dutch competitor, the V.O.C.). Remarkably, the English offered at this time to acquiesce in this exclusion from the East Indies, but insisted on retaining the restrictions in the Navigation Act. At the same time, they declined to talk about the delineation of the Dutch and English possessions in North America (New Netherland and the New Haven Colony, respectively) about which a preliminary local agreement had been concluded, but not finalized by the metropolitan powers, in the Hartford Agreement of 19 September 1650.

=== Diplomacy by other means ===
Source: Meanwhile, relations between the two countries became tense, when, in answer to depredations of English privateers against neutral Dutch shipping in an undeclared maritime conflict between the Commonwealth and France, (Note: The Dutch also objected to the abuse of the Navigation Act as a pretext by English privateers, and worse English prize courts, to condemn innocent Dutch ships that were captured on the High Seas. This, more than the economic effect of the Act, was a casus belli for the Dutch.) the Dutch started a program of naval expansion, by which the English (who had recently expanded their own fleet) felt threatened. After a naval incident about saluting the English flag in the "English Seas" the First Anglo-Dutch War started and the negotiations were suspended.

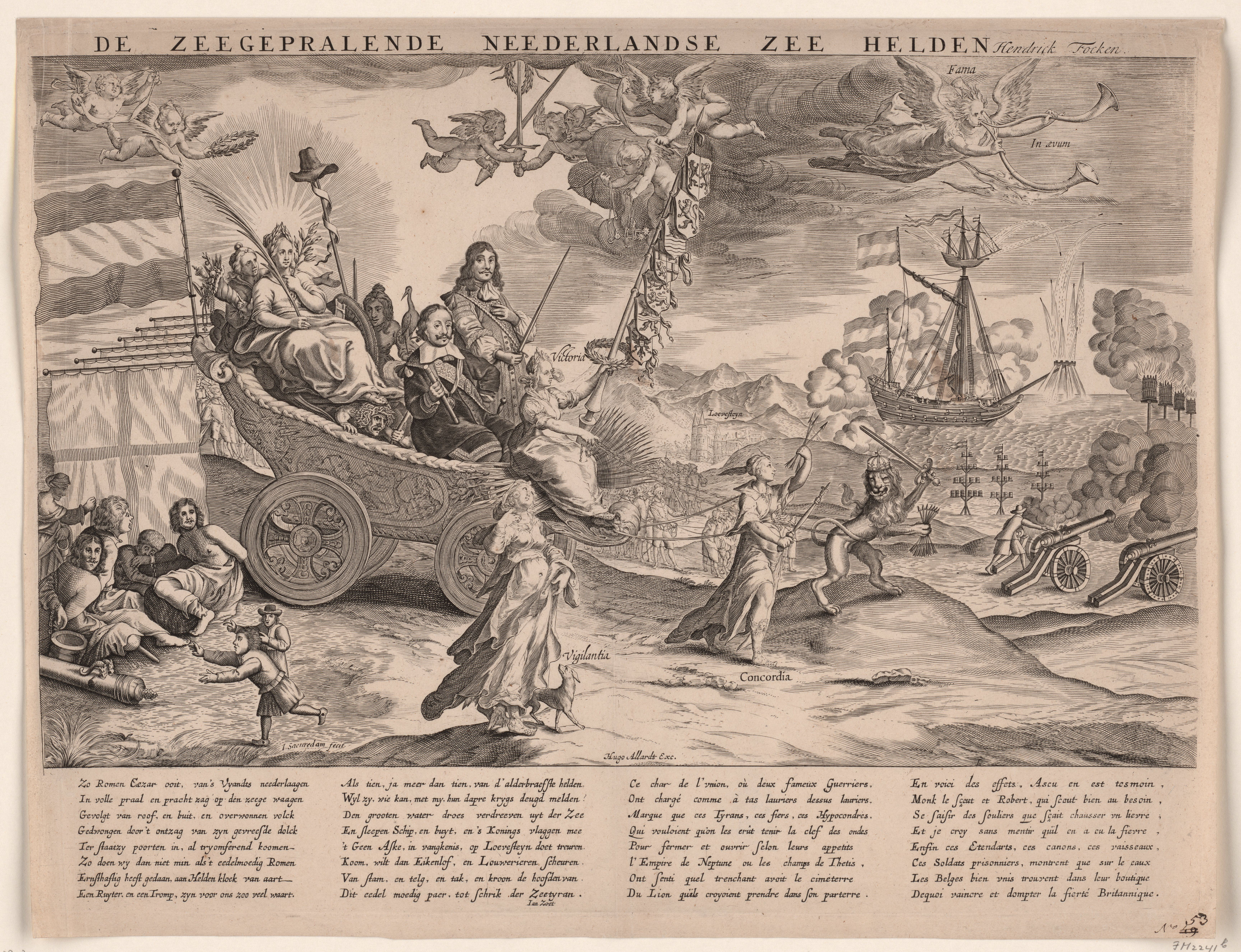
Allegory of the Dutch victories at sea during the Second English War, 1654 The Sea, praising Dutch Sea Heroes

The war was lost militarily by the Dutch, who after a number of lost naval battles were blockaded in their own country by the Commonwealth Navy. This caused great economic hardship. On the other hand, the English in their turn were victimized by a wider Dutch "encirclement" that blocked English shipping from the Baltic by Denmark, a Dutch ally, aided by a strong Dutch naval detachment cruising near the Sound, and from South-East Asia by the V.O.C. English trade with the Mediterranean was also greatly hampered by Dutch privateering and naval activity, especially after the Battle of Leghorn. Both countries after a while were so economically exhausted that they hankered after peace.

=== Peace negotiations ===
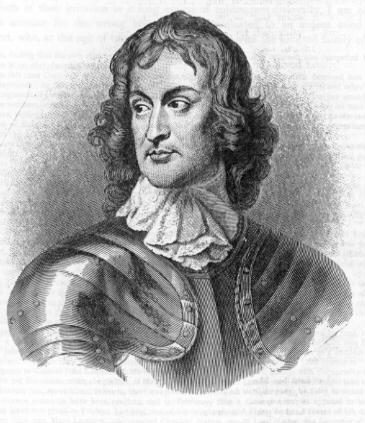
English commissioner John Lambert

Lord Protector Oliver Cromwell and Grand Pensionary Johan de Witt agreed to open peace negotiations in London in June 1653. The Dutch government sent a delegation, consisting of the commissioners Beverningh, Nieupoort (for the States of Holland), Van de Perre (for the States of Zeeland), and Jongestal (for the States of Friesland). Their English counterparts were Lawrence, Lambert, Montagu, and Lisle. The negotiations started where they had left off in 1652: the Dutch reiterated their 36 articles and demanded access to the American colonies; the English replied with a restatement of their demand for reparations and their previously rejected proposal for a political union between the two countries. Cromwell proposed that "while the two countries should retain their municipal laws" the two countries should "be under one supreme power, consisting of representatives of both countries" and "natives of both countries should mutually enjoy their privileges, without any difference or distinction."

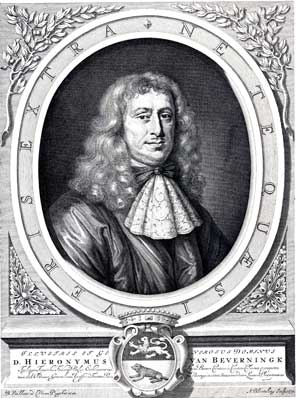
Dutch commissioner Hieronymus van Beverningh

After Jongestal and Nieupoort had returned to The Hague to receive instructions regarding this startling proposal in mid-August 1653, the English side toned down the proposal in favor of a less far-reaching proposal for an alliance between the Protestant Powers of Europe and France, against the Catholic Powers, in which the Commonwealth and the Republic would take the lead; a commission, consisting of an equal number of members from each country, to determine differences peacefully; a joint fleet to "secure the sea;" liberty of the inhabitants of both countries to trade in Europe and overseas; the assignment of trade in East Asia solely to the Dutch in exchange for indemnification of the E.I.C.; the assignment of trade in the Americas (except Brazil, that was to be divided in influence spheres between the two countries) exclusively to the Commonwealth; and Dutch naval assistance to English attempts at conquest in Spanish America. (The two remaining Dutch ambassadors rejected the last proposal out of hand, as it would jeopardize the good relations which the Dutch Republic had recently established with Spain).

Jongestal and Nieuport returned in November 1653 with instructions to reject the proposed union, but to seek a close alliance commensurate with maintenance of Dutch independence. Later that month the English side presented a draft treaty of 27 articles. In two of those articles the phrase that subjects of both countries might trade in each other's dominions saving the laws and ordinances of either commonwealth appeared. This phrase, though innocuous at first sight, represented the English intention to maintain the provisions of the Navigation Act. The Dutch representatives countered with amendments to the proposed articles that would free their commerce from the restrictions of the Act. In addition they proposed to regulate commerce outside Europe. This was followed by further exchanges of proposals that were unacceptable to one side or the other. Finally it was agreed to keep silent about regulation of trade outside Europe, and to recognize the right of both parties to reciprocal indemnification for injuries suffered (except those suffered in the course of the hostilities, for which reciprocal immunities were granted).

The treaty appeared ready for signing when suddenly two new obstacles were raised. In the first place the Dutch asked for the King of Denmark (their ally in the war) to be included in the treaty. Secondly, Cromwell demanded that the then-four-year-old Prince of Orange (Note: Ironically, the little boy would grow into the man who in 35 years' time would, in a sense, realize Cromwell's project for a political union between the two countries in the Glorious Revolution.) should be excluded from future government appointments, like the stadtholderate, or the captaincy-general of the States Army. (Note: This was to be art. 12 in the draft-treaty.) The first demand was accepted, but the second at first appeared unacceptable to the Dutch ambassadors, who returned home. Secret direct negotiations between Cromwell and De Witt (represented by Beverningh), led to agreement on the matter of the exclusion of the Prince, however without the knowledge of the States General of the Netherlands. A secret clause, requiring the enactment of what became known as the Act of Seclusion by the States of Holland as a precondition for ratification of the treaty by the Commonwealth, would be added to the treaty that would only bind the States of Holland. The Dutch ambassadors returned to England after a few weeks' absence (only the representatives of Holland being aware of the secret clause) and completed the negotiations, tying up a number of loose ends, especially the important provisions in art. 30 of the treaty, laying down the principles of arbitration of mutual claims by a commission of equal representation convening in London, backed up by a provision charging the Protestant Swiss Cantons with binding arbitration, in case the arbiters in London could not reach agreement. The treaty was signed on 5/15 April 1654, and ratified by both states within a fortnight (ratification resolution of the States General 12/22 April 1654, Cromwell 19/29 April 1654). (Note: Davenport gives 11 April as the Old-Style date for the ratification by the States General, but this must be an error, because the correctly given New-Style date of 22 April 1654 calculates as the Old-Style date of 12 April.)

== Aftermath ==
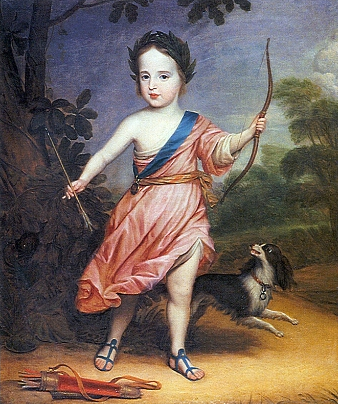
Prince William in martial attire in 1654 by Gerard van Honthorst

With hindsight, the most momentous provision in the treaty was the secret clause concerning the Act of Seclusion. When the secret eventually leaked, it caused a political crisis in the Dutch Republic. Eventually, De Witt was able to remain in power, and the furore subsided. The Act of Seclusion remained in effect, playing a part in Dutch internal politics, until the very end of the De Witt regime, even after the Restoration seemingly obviated its existence.

The British historian Jonathan Israel writes that otherwise, taking into account that the Republic lost the war militarily, the treaty was remarkably lenient for the Dutch. He ascribes this to the diplomatic acumen of De Witt, who managed to avoid doing any major concession to England's maritime and colonial interests. Cromwell did not achieve his main objectives: the coveted political union came to naught (Note: Though some face-saving generalities were included in the preamble and the first article, referring to "... a more intimate and nearer alliance, confederacy, and union, than heretofore ...";) and the E.I.C. remained in fact blocked from freedom of trade in the East Indies (this freedom for British commerce would be achieved only in the Treaty of Paris of 1784, ending the Fourth Anglo-Dutch War).

On the other hand, the Dutch realized few of the objectives in their 36 articles. Matters like the freedom of the seas (as regards Dutch shipping), the principle of "free ship, free goods" (the inviolability of neutral shipping in time of war), and the restriction of the concept of contraband, had to wait till the Treaty of Breda (1667) and the Treaty of Westminster (1674).

The matter of the fraught phrase respecting the laws and ordinances of both states by each other's merchants in each other's dominions went by default when the Dutch commissioner Van de Perre died during the negotiations (He had been the champion of the Dutch West India Company which was especially hurt by the Navigation Act, and had therefore been the driving force behind the Dutch attempts to get the Act repealed, or at least amended). This clause therefore remained in the treaty, but the Dutch did not agree to interpret this as a recognition of the Navigation Act. Instead, the Dutch peace delegation remained behind to try and negotiate a repeal of the Act, but this effort was unsuccessful. This matter would have to wait also to the Breda treaty, in which the Dutch won concessions mitigating the Act (or rather its 1660 successor). Meanwhile, Dutch merchants honored the Act in the breach. However, in art. 12 of the treaty the parties accorded each other what would later become known as "most favored nation" status.

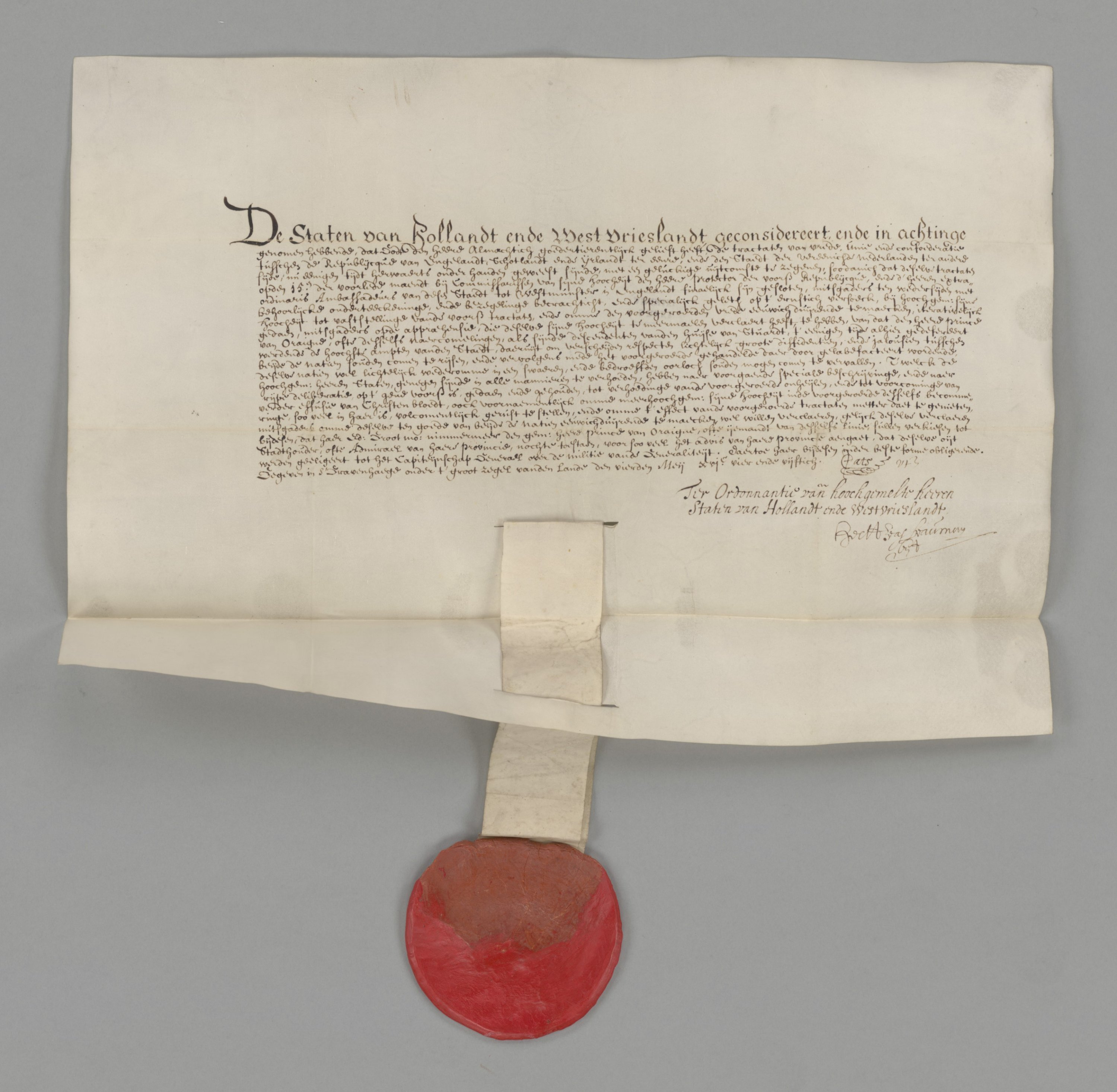
The Act of Seclusion

Of lasting importance was art. 30, which set up a commission to arbitrate all claims of both sides to which the treaty did not extend immunity (under e.g. articles 3 and 16). New here was that the principle of binding arbitration by a third party (the Protestant Swiss Cantons (Note: The reason why the Swiss Cantons were selected may simply have been that they were available. The Cantons, worried about the weakening of the "Protestant Cause" in Europe by the war between the main supporters of that cause, had sent a special envoy, the Town Clerk of Schaffhausen Johann Jacob Stockar, to mediate between the two parties. This eventually met with much appreciation from both sides.)) was first agreed on as a means of conflict resolution in an international treaty.

The Dutch were also unsuccessful in obtaining ratification of the 1650 Hartford agreement concerning the border between New Netherland and Connecticut. This matter would be finally resolved by the transfer of New Netherland to England by the Treaty of Westminster of 1674.

The Dutch were forced to make three minor humiliating concessions. They promised to punish those culpable in the Amboyna Massacre exemplarily (art. 27). However, no such people were still alive to be punished, as the Dutch probably well knew. The matter of reparation for the affair was handled under the arbitration agreement of art. 30 of the treaty. The commissioner's awarded a relatively trifling sum to the descendants of the victims of the affair.

Furthermore, the Dutch promised in art. 13 of the treaty to go on saluting the flag of English warships in the "English Seas" (i.e. mainly the English Channel) "as in the times of Queen Elizabeth." This did not, however, imply an admission of sovereignty of England over those "English Seas."

Thirdly, the treaty contained the provision that rebels designated by either of the two countries were to be banished. This first of all targeted the pretender Charles Stuart, who had since 1648 found asylum in the Republic at the court of his sister Mary and her husband stadtholder William II. He subsequently had to move to the Spanish Netherlands. Ironically, a similar clause was to be included in the treaties Charles II himself concluded with the Republic in 1662, 1667 and 1674, after his Restoration, but then aimed at the regicides.

The island Run in the East Indies, which had been claimed by the E.I.C. since at least 1623, but had always been denied to them by its rival, the militarily-stronger V.O.C., was formally ceded to the E.I.C. This cession, however, did not take practical effect till March 1665. The island was taken back by the V.O.C.in November 1666 during the Second Anglo-Dutch War and formally ceded to the V.O.C. by the Treaty of Breda in 1667 in part-exchange for New Netherland.

== See also ==
- List of treaties
