= Orangism (Dutch Republic) =

Supporters of the Princes of Orange

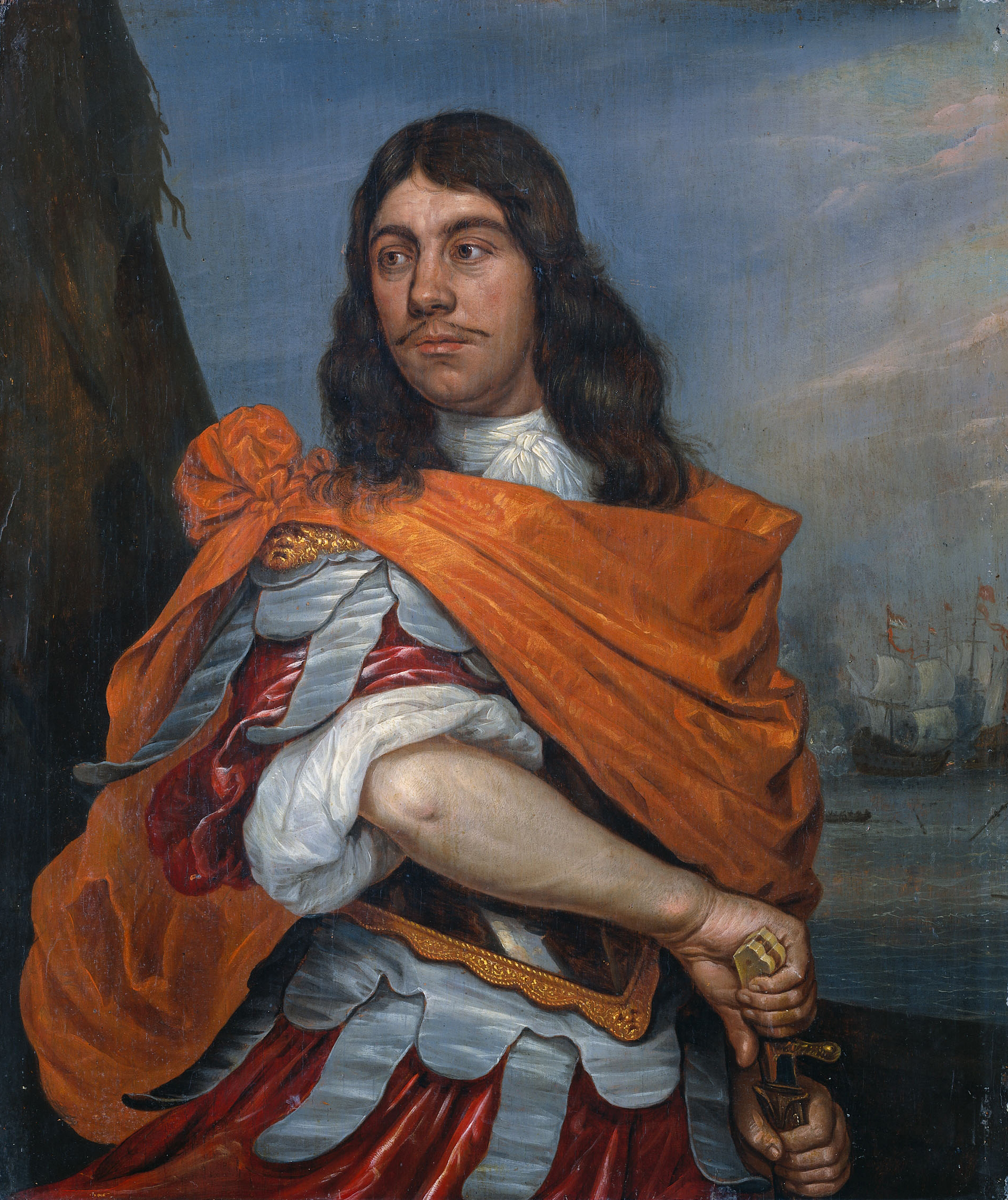
Cornelis Tromp by Abraham Evertsz. van Westerveld (ca. 1666). Tromp is pictured in Roman costume. His orangist sympathies are reflected by the color of his mantle.

In the history of the Dutch Republic, Orangism or prinsgezindheid ("pro-prince stance") was a political force opposing the Staatsgezinde (pro-Republic) party. Orangists supported the Princes of Orange as Stadtholders (a position held by members of the House of Orange) and military commanders of the Republic, as a check on the power of the regenten. The Orangist party drew its adherents largely from traditionalists – mostly farmers, soldiers, noblemen and orthodox Protestant preachers, though its support fluctuated heavily over the course of the Republic's history and there were never clear-cut socioeconomic divisions.

== History ==
=== The coup of stadtholder Maurice against Oldenbarnevelt ===
Orangism can be seen as a continuation of the political opposition between the remonstrants and counter-remonstrants during the Twelve Years' Truce (1609-1621). The Remonstrants were tolerant and republican, with a liberal view on biblical interpretation, no belief in predestination and were led by men like Johan van Oldenbarnevelt and Hugo Grotius. Stadtholder Maurice of Nassau, Prince of Orange relied on the counter-remonstrants to oppose van Oldenbarnevelt and support his own policies, and things got so bad that civil war threatened. Oldenbarnevelt was executed after a sham trial in 1619 and Grotius sentenced to life in prison, and for a number of years the Orangists were in charge under Maurice and later his brother Frederick Henry, Prince of Orange.

=== First Stadtholderless Period and Orange Restoration of 1672 ===
Orangists such as the Vice-Admiral Johan Evertsen backed the appointment of William, Prince of Orange, the posthumously-born son of William II, Prince of Orange, to the office of stadtholder of the Holland and Zeeland. The office had been vacant since the death of William II in 1650. The pro-Republic Dutch States Party was marked by caution (especially in all matters that could harm trade), led by Grand pensionary Johan de Witt and had supporters among the ruling class, the regenten which included his relative from Amsterdam, Cornelis de Graeff. It was de Witt who, in the 1654 peace with England and its leader Oliver Cromwell, agreed to include the secret Act of Seclusion barring the infant William III from the stadtholderate. De Witt then put pressure on all seven of the Republic's provinces to uphold this ban. The Orangist party was eventually led by the young Prince of Orange himself and by men such as Cornelis Tromp. It played an important part in the expulsion of the de Witt brothers (Cornelis de Witt and Johan de Witt), which culminated during the Rampjaar with William III's appointment as stadtholder on 28 June 1672 followed by an organised lynching of the brothers at the Gevangenpoort in the Hague on 20 August.

=== Second Stadtholderless Period and Orange Restoration of 1747 ===
After the death of William III in 1702 his Dutch ministers decided again to keep the office of stadtholder vacant, mainly because there was no clear successor available (the claim of John William Friso, Prince of Orange, a minor at this time, to the title of Prince of Orange was disputed by his cousin Frederick I of Prussia), though Friso was recognised by the States of Friesland as their stadtholder. Friso died in 1711, and his son William IV, Prince of Orange also was born posthumously. William IV was appointed stadtholder of Friesland, Groningen, and Gelderland at his majority in 1731, but the other provinces kept the office vacant, until in 1747 a popular revolt by Orangists forced the States of the other four provinces to follow suit and appoint him their stadtholder also. This was the first time that all stadtholder's offices in the Dutch Republic were in the same hand. William IV received almost dictatorial powers under the so-called Government Regulations of 1748. Hopes of democratic political reform were, however, dashed. After his early death, at age 40, in 1751, the stadtholderate (that had been declared hereditary) passed to his infant son William V, Prince of Orange, but actual power was exercised by Regents, like his mother Anne, Princess Royal and Princess of Orange until his majority in 1766.

=== Patriottentijd ===
In the second half of the 18th century the anti-Orangist party became known as the Patriots. These Patriots strongly opposed both the Prince of Orange and the Dutch alliance with Great Britain. Many of their numbers were drawn from those with commercial and maritime interests who saw Britain as a natural rival of the Dutch, and generally supported the French. At various times the Princes of Orange tried to counter this by moving closer or further away from the alliance with Britain. Events came to a head in the period 1785–1787, when most of the dictatorial powers of the stadtholder were taken away by the Patriots. However, the Prussian invasion of Holland in 1787 gave the upper hand to the Orangists, who drove their Patriot opponents into exile. The powers of the stadtholder were now enshrined in the so-called Act of Guarantee of 1788, and guaranteed by Britain and Prussia "in perpetuity."

=== Batavian Republic and Exile ===
Following France's invasion of the Dutch Republic and the Batavian Revolution in 1795, resulting in the founding of the Batavian Republic, William V, Prince of Orange fled to England, where he issued the Kew Letters, ordering all Dutch colonies to accept temporary British occupations to prevent them from falling into French hands. During the Anglo-Russian invasion of Holland of 1799, a large portion of the Batavian Navy surrendered to the British, with help from the young Erfprins Willem Frederik, in the Vlieter incident. But the invasion itself was unsuccessful, because the hoped-for Orangist insurrection failed to materialize. At the Treaty of Amiens of 1802, William V gave up his claims to the stadtholderate in exchange for the Principality of Nassau-Orange-Fulda. This so discouraged his followers in the Batavian Republic that many made their peace with the new regime, and some, like Carel Hendrik Ver Huell, went over to the French emperor Napoleon completely, becoming staunch supporters of his autocratic regime, during the period 1810-1813 during which the Netherlands was annexed to the First French Empire.

=== Founding of the Kingdom of the Netherlands ===
In 1813, when the French retreated from the Netherlands, old Orangist partisans, led by Gijsbert Karel van Hogendorp, managed to put the son of William V on a newly-invented throne, first of a principality, and soon of the newly-founded Kingdom of the Netherlands.

== Political theory ==
The stadtholderate was never a well-defined concept in the constitution of the Dutch Republic, instead being a patchwork of responsibilities. Likewise, Orangism never became a consistent political theory. In particular, the Orangists never formulated a desire for absolute sovereignty in the hands of the princes, even though they "lean[ed] heavily on the concept of monarchy", since this would have been problematic in the Republic that wrested its independence from the kings of Spain under William of Orange. Instead, they stated their views in terms of republican liberty, sharing the idiom of their States Party opponents.

Attempts to introduce elements of John Locke's natural law and Montesquieu's separation of powers (by Elie Luzac) failed when these same theories were taken over by the opposing Patriot faction in the 1780s.

== See also ==
- Politics and government of the Netherlands (1581–1795)

== Sources ==
- Davies, Norman; "Europe: a history." Pimlico, 1997.
- Israel, J.I. (1995), The Dutch Republic: Its Rise, Greatness and Fall, 1477–1806, Oxford University Press,ISBN 0-19-873072-1 hardback, ISBN 0-19-820734-4 paperback
