= Battle of Leghorn =

1653 battle of the First Anglo-Dutch War

- Part of the First Anglo-Dutch War
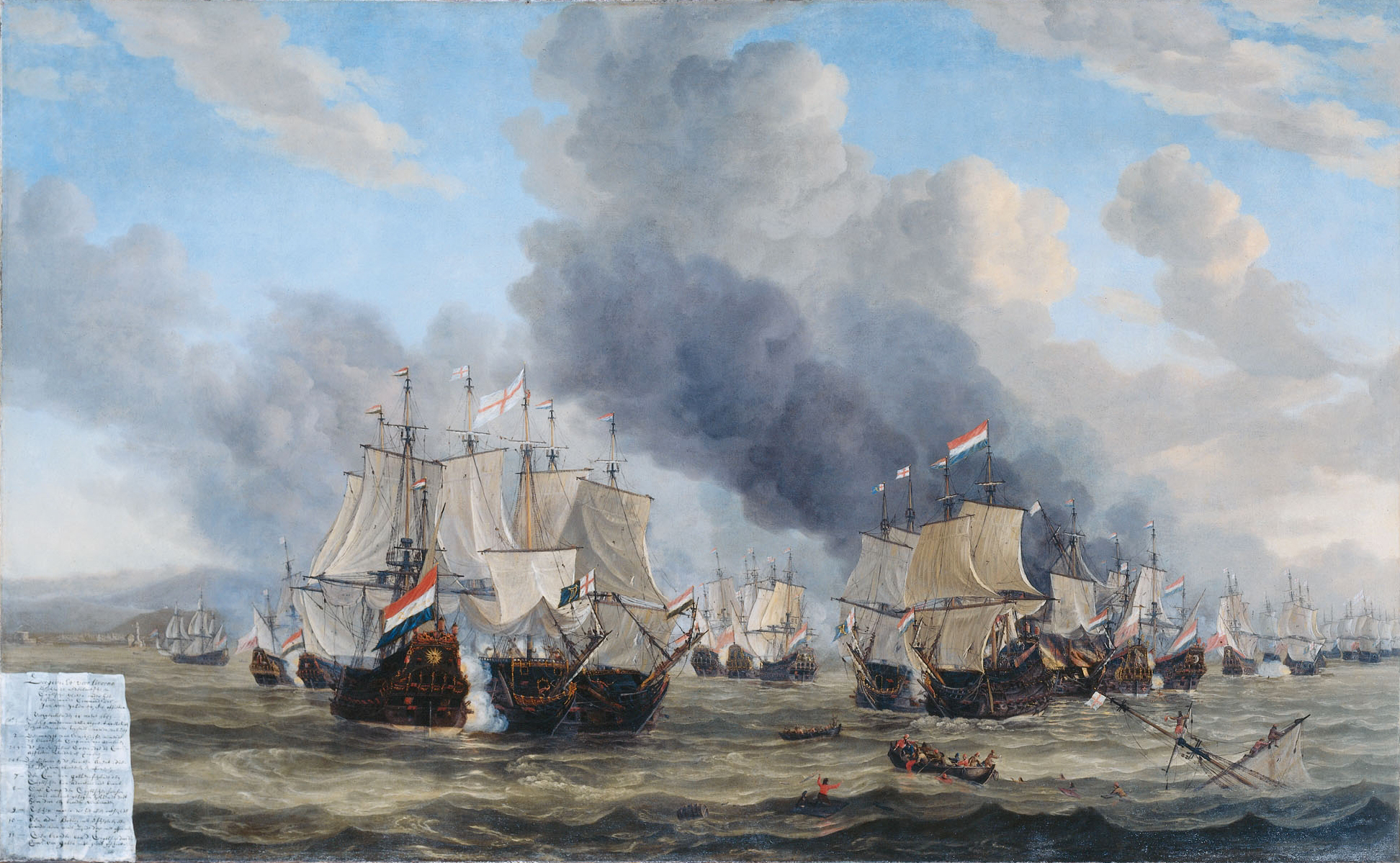
- The Battle of Leghorn, 4 March 1653; Reinier Nooms, c. 1660
Date	4 March 1653
Location	near Leghorn, Italy
Result	Dutch victory

Belligerents
Commonwealth of England	United Provinces

Commanders and leaders
Henry Appleton; Richard Badiley	Johan van Galen (DOW)

Strength
15 warships	16 warships

Casualties and losses
2 ships sunk 3 ships captured 150 dead or injured 50 captured	Unknown

The naval Battle of Leghorn (Note: the Dutch call the encounter by the Italian name Livorno) took place on 4 March 1653 (14 March Gregorian calendar), (Note: During this period in English history dates of events are usually recorded in the Julian calendar, while those the Netherlands are recorded in the Gregorian calendar. In this article dates are in the Julian calendar with the start of the year adjusted to 1 January (see Old Style and New Style dates).) during the First Anglo-Dutch War, near Leghorn (Livorno), Italy. It was a victory of a Dutch squadron under Commodore Johan van Galen over an English squadron under Captain Henry Appleton. Afterwards, another English squadron under Captain Richard Badiley, which Appleton had been trying to join up with, reached the scene in time to observe the capture of the last ships of Appleton's squadron, but was outnumbered and forced to return to Porto Longone.

== Background ==
In 1652 the government of the Commonwealth of England, mistakenly believing that the United Provinces after their defeat at the Battle of the Kentish Knock would desist from bringing out fleets so late in the season, split their fleet between the Mediterranean and home waters. This division of forces led to a defeat at the Battle of Dungeness in December 1652, and by early 1653 the situation in the Mediterranean was critical too. Appleton's squadron of six ships (including four hired merchantmen) was trapped in Leghorn by a blockading Dutch fleet of 16 ships, while Richard Badiley's of eight (also including four hired merchantmen) was at Elba.

The only hope for the English was to combine their forces, but Appleton sailed too soon and engaged with the Dutch before Badiley could come up to help. Three of his ships were captured and two destroyed and only one (Mary), sailing faster than the Dutch ships, escaped to join Badiley. Badiley engaged the Dutch, but was heavily outnumbered and retreated.

The battle gave the Dutch command of the Mediterranean, placing the English trade with the Levant at their mercy, but Van Galen was mortally wounded, dying on 13 March.

One of the Dutch captains at the battle was son of Lieutenant-Admiral Maarten Tromp, Cornelis Tromp, who was to become a famous admiral himself and one of the most celebrated and controversial figures in Dutch naval history due to his actions in the Anglo-Dutch Wars and the Scanian War.

== Ships involved ==
=== United Provinces of the Netherlands ===
Johan van Galen

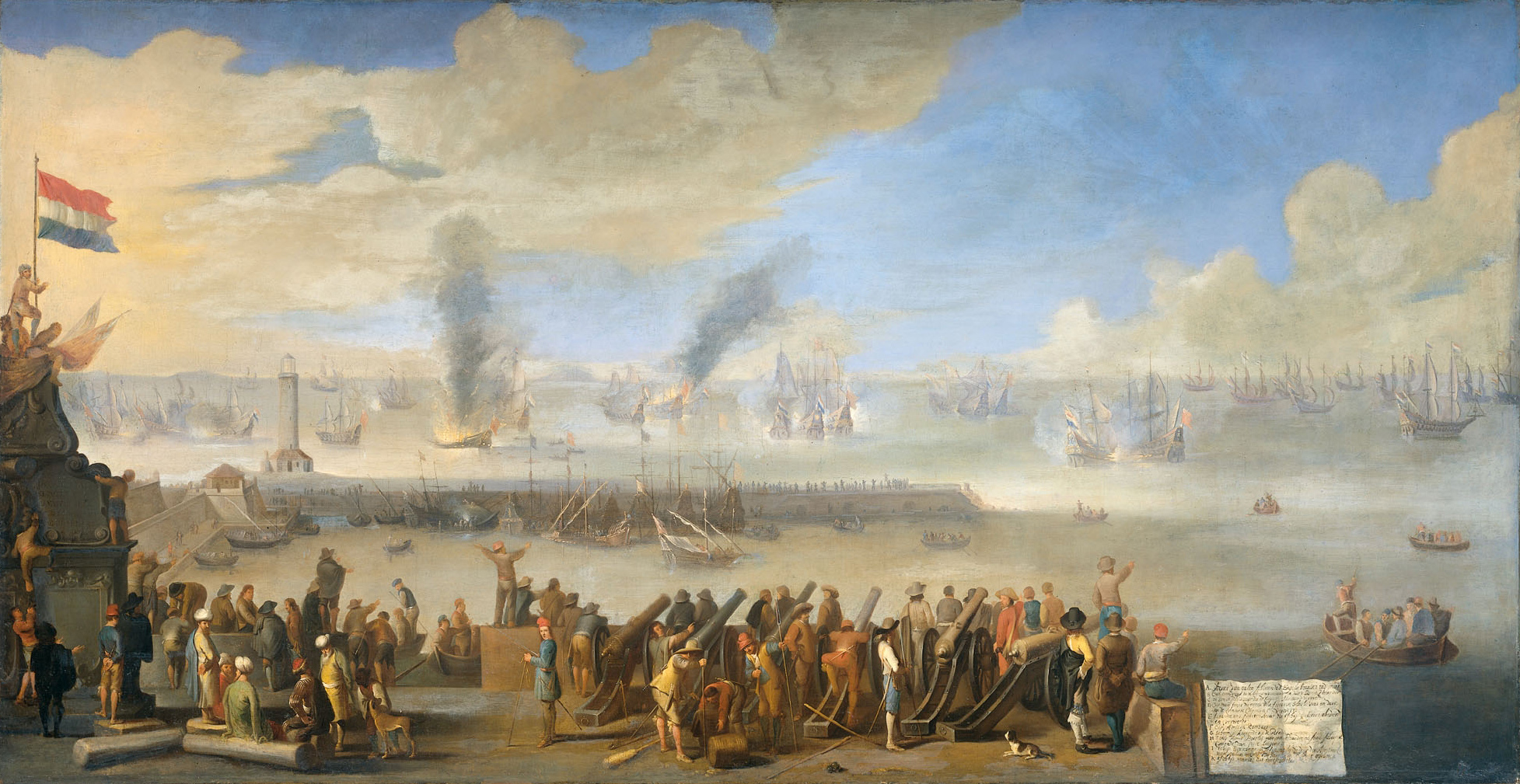
The battle of Leghorn. Johannes Lingelbach

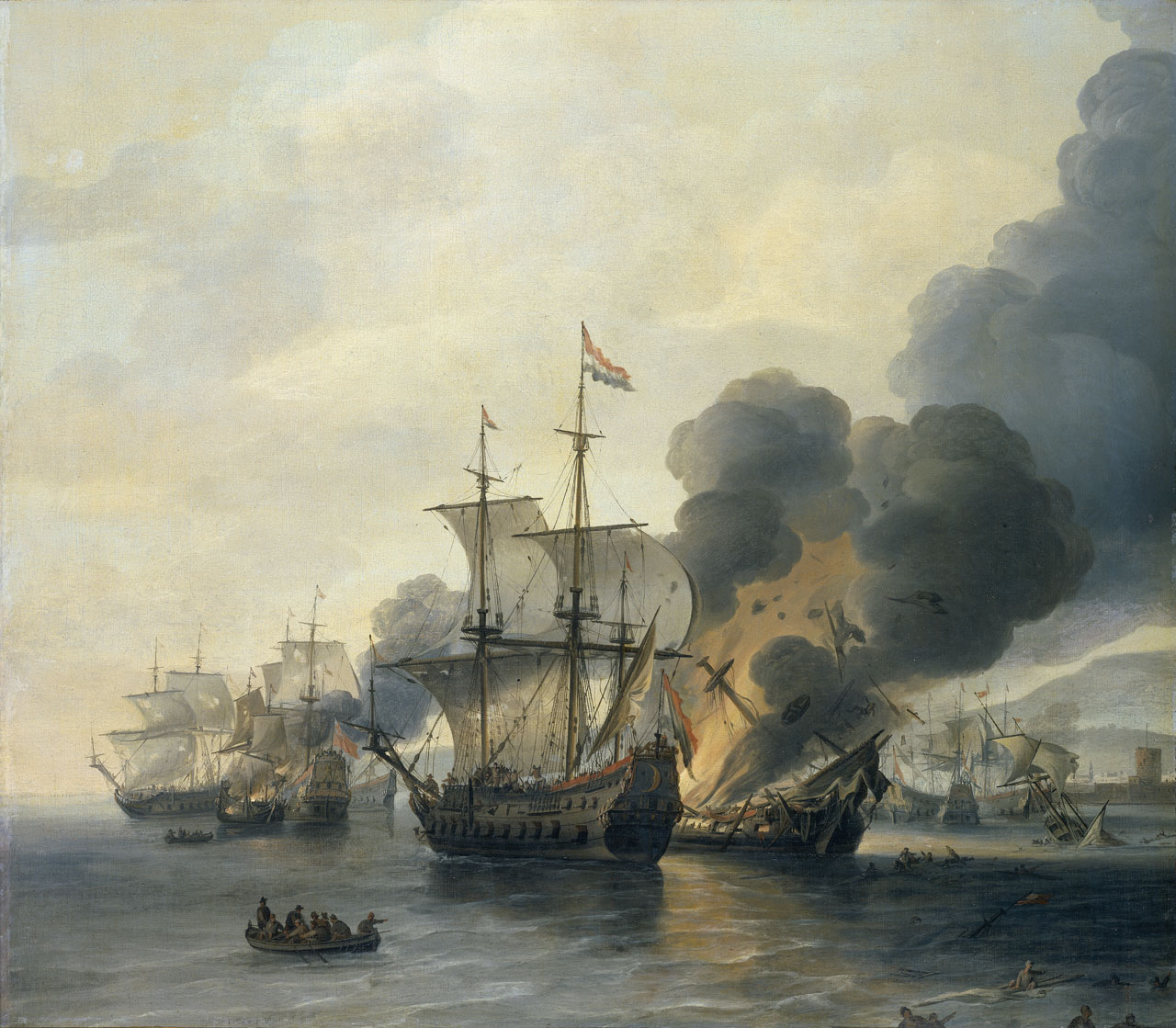
The Battle of Leghorn, 1653 by Willem van Diest.

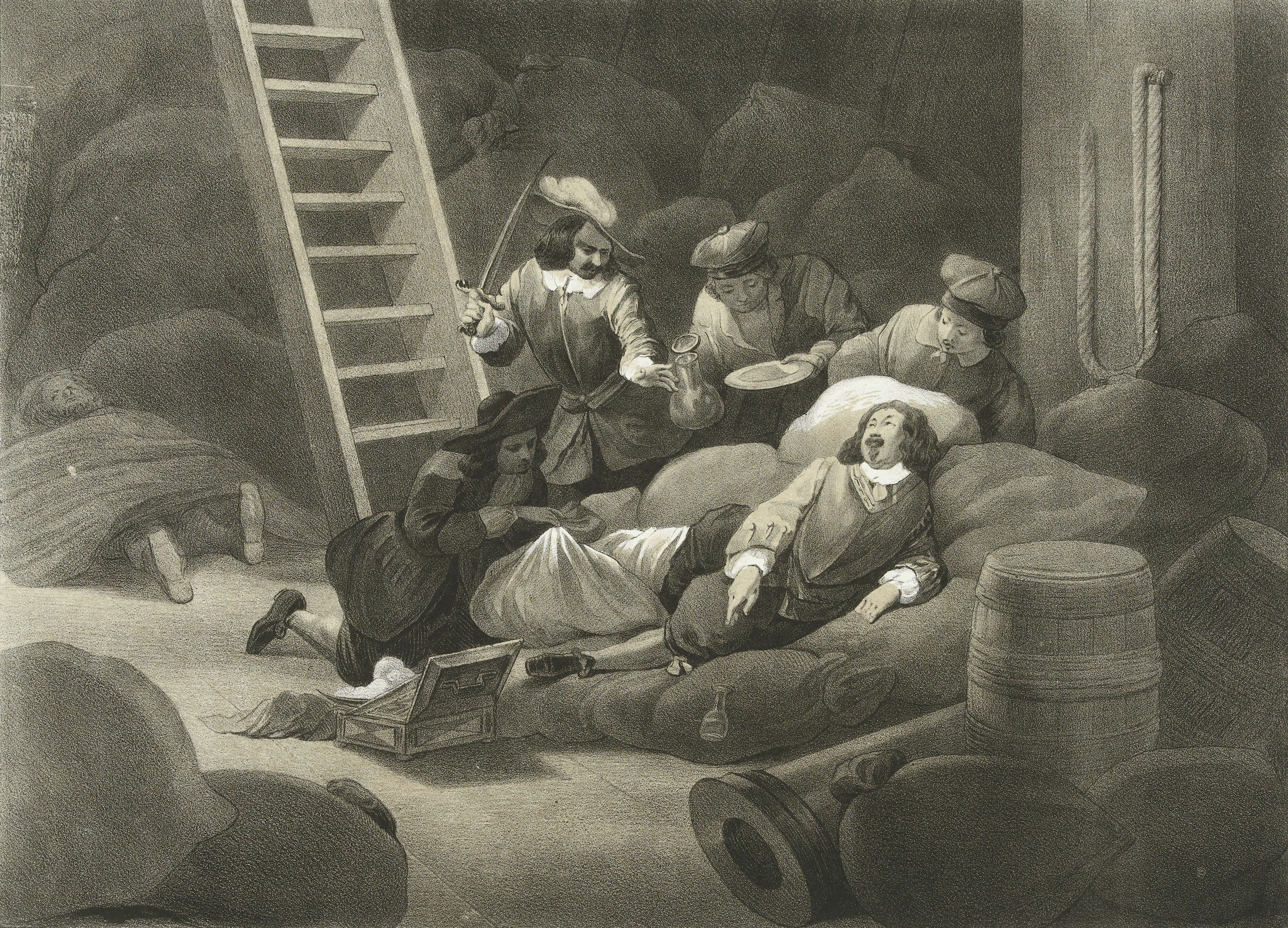
Johan van Galen becomes mortally wounded during battle

- Vereenigde Provincien/Zeven Provincien (United Provinces/Seven Provinces) 40 (flag)
- Eendracht (Concord) 40 (Jacob de Boer)
- Maan (Moon) 40 (Cornelis Tromp)
- Ter Goes 40 (Jan Richewijn)
- Zon (Sun) 40 (Pieter van Zalingen)
- Zutphen 36 (Jan Uijttenhout)
- Maagd van Enkhuysen (Maiden of Enkhuysen) 34 (Jan Roetering)
- Jonge Prins (Young Prince) 28 (Cornelis Barentszoon)
- Julius Caesar 28 (hired merchantman) (Jacon Janszoon Roocher)
- Witte Olifant (White Elephant) (hired Italian merchantman Elefante Bianco) 28 (Sijbrant Janszoon Mol)
- Madonna della Vigna 28 (hired merchantman) (Harman Sonne) - Ran aground north of Livorno harbor, but salved
- Susanna 28 (hired merchantman) (Daniel Janszoon de Vries)
- Zwarte Arend (Black Eagle) 28 (Pieter Janszoon van Bontebotter)
- Salomons Oordeel (Judgment of Salomon) 28 (hired merchantman) (Meijndert Theunissen van Oosterwout)
- Roode Haes (Red Hare) 28 (hired merchantman) (Adriaan Rodenhaes)
- Ster (Star) 28 (hired merchantman) (Hendrik Govertszoon)

The Eendracht and Jonge Prins were ships of the Noorderkwartier Admiralty, all the others (including the hired merchantmen) pertained to the Amsterdam Admiralty.

=== Commonwealth of England ===
Capt. Henry Appleton's squadron

- Bonaventure 44 (Stephen Lyne) - Blown up by Vereenigde Provincien
- Leopard 48 ('flagship' of Appleton) - Captured (by Eendracht?)
- Samson 40 (hired merchantman, Edmund Seaman) - Burnt by fireship
- Mary 30 (hired merchantman, Benjamin Fisher)
- Peregrine 30 (hired merchantman, John Wood) - Captured by Zwarte Arend
- Levant Merchant 28/30? (hired merchantman, Stephen Marsh) - Captured by Maagd van Enkhuysen

Capt. Richard Badiley's squadron

- Paragon 52 ('flagship' of Badiley)
- Phoenix 36 (Owen Cox)
- Elizabeth 36 (Jonas Reeves)
- Constant Warwick 32 (Upshott)
- Mary Rose 32 (hired merchantman, John Turtley)
- Lewis 30 (hired merchantman, William Elle)
- William and Thomas 30 (hired merchantman, John Godolphin)
- Thomas Bonaventure 28 (hired merchantman, George Hughes)
- ? (fireship, Peter Whyting)

The fireship is listed as Charity in Mariner's Mirror vol. 49, but according to Mariner's Mirror vol. 24 that ship was expended during an action off Plymouth on 27 August 1652.
