= 1475 Tenochtitlan earthquake =

Earthquake in 1475 during reign of Axayacatl

Coordinates: 19.420°N 99.181°W

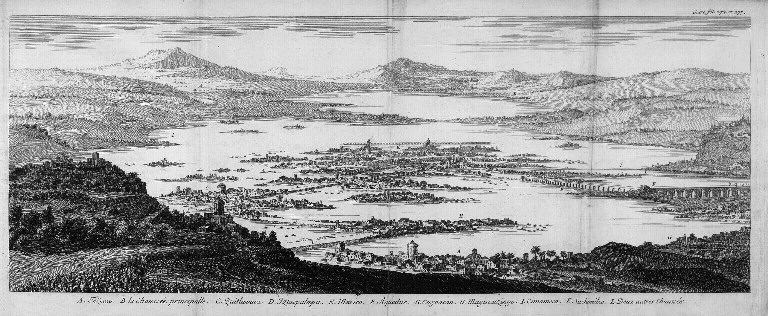
View of Tenochtitlán with Lake Texcoco in the background, by Van Beecq (1638–1722)

The 1475 Tenochtitlan earthquake (9 Cane of the Aztec calendar) was an earthquake that occurred in Ancient Mexico-Tenochtitlan (current Mexico City), during the reign of Tlatoani Axayacatl on 19 February 1475. Because it happened during Pre-Hispanic times, little is known about this earthquake, but it is considered to be perhaps the most significant of those dates.

The only record appears in the Aubin Codex, and thanks to Spanish franciscan friar Juan de Torquemada who reported in his book, Monarquia Indiana according to the codex, that the earthquake "Was so strong that not only did many houses fall, but the mountains and mountains in many places they crumbled and fell apart". The Mexicas considered the earthquake as the prophecy of the end of their Empire.

== Damage ==
This earthquake left all the houses in the Valley of Mexico destroyed and caused considerable damage to the palaces and teocallis in the area. Several chinampas sank, the hills were washed away, crumbled and disintegrated, cracks were created in the earth and caused a tsunami in Lake Texcoco.

== Earthquake ==
SIMMSA geologists have carried out various studies which have determined that the possible epicenter of this earthquake would be in the current Cuajimalpa, due to local faults and with an approximate magnitude of 7.5 on the Richter scale.
