= English ship Bonaventure (1621) =

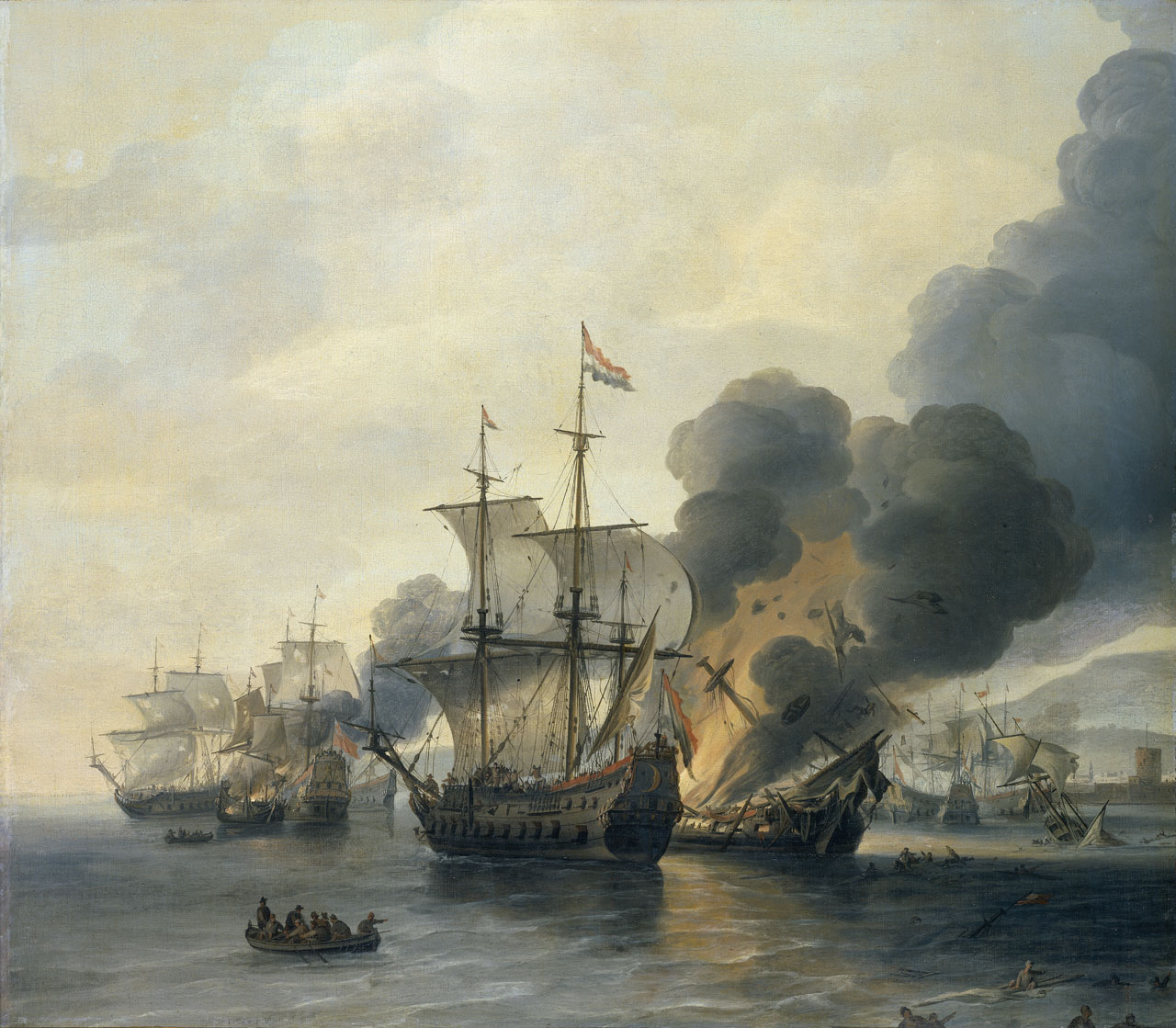
- HMS Bonaventure explodes at the Battle of Leghorn, a painting by Willem van Diest

History

England
- Name: Bonaventure
- Builder: Burrell, Deptford
- Launched: 1621
- Fate: Blown up, 1653

General characteristics
- Class & type: Middling ship
- Length: 96 ft (29 m) (keel)
- Beam: 32 ft 5 in (9.88 m)
- Depth of hold: 13 ft 5 in (4.09 m)
- Sail plan: Full-rigged ship

Bonaventure was a middling ship of the English navy, built by Andrew Burrell at Deptford and launched in 1621.

Bonaventure was blown up in action in 1653.
