= First Anglo-Dutch War =

Conflict between the Commonwealth and the Dutch Republic

- Part of the Anglo-Dutch Wars
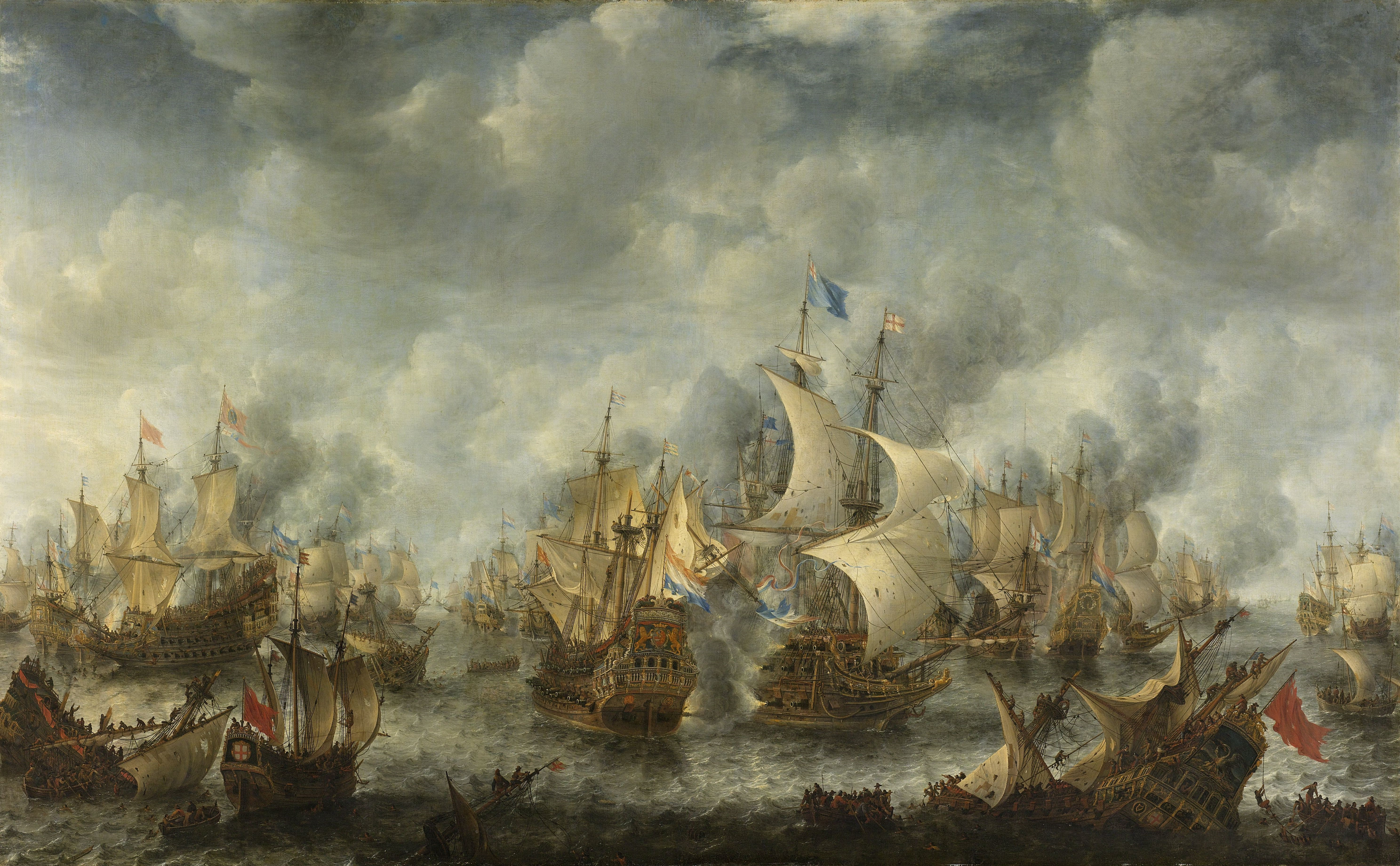
- The Battle of Scheveningen, the war's final major battle
Date	1652–1654 (Note: Dates in this article are given in the Gregorian calendar, then 10 days ahead of the Julian calendar in use in England.)
Location	English Channel, North Sea, Persian Gulf, Mediterranean Sea, Irish Sea, Caribbean, Indian Ocean
Result	Treaty of Westminster (1654)

Belligerents
Dutch Republic	Commonwealth of England

Commanders and leaders
Adriaan Pauw; Johan de Witt; Maarten Tromp †; Witte de With; Michiel de Ruyter; Johan van Galen †	Oliver Cromwell; Robert Blake; George Ayscue; Henry Appleton; George Monck

Strength
1653: 154 warships (Note: 14–18 artillery pieces: 5; 22–28 artillery pieces: 92; 30–38 artillery pieces: 42; 40–46 artillery pieces: 14; 54 artillery pieces: 1.)	

Casualties and losses
60 warships lost 1,700 merchant ships captured	~30 warships lost 400 merchant ships captured

The First Anglo-Dutch War, or First Dutch War, (Note: Dutch: Eerste Engelse (zee-)oorlog, "First English (Sea) War"; 1652–1654) was a naval conflict between the Commonwealth of England and the Dutch Republic. Largely caused by disputes over trade, it began with English attacks on Dutch merchant shipping, but expanded to vast fleet actions. Despite a series of victories in 1652 and 1653, the Commonwealth was unable to blockade Dutch trade, although English privateers inflicted serious losses on Dutch merchant shipping.

The economic damage eventually led to the Treaty of Westminster in 1654 where the Dutch were forced to make minor concessions to the Commonwealth. Both sides agreed to the exclusion of the House of Orange from the office of Stadtholder, but failed to resolve underlying commercial issues. In 1665, Dutch objections to the Navigation Acts and English concerns over their rival's trading practices led to the Second Anglo-Dutch War.

== Background ==
In the 16th century, England had supported the Dutch Republic in the Eighty Years' War against Spain. They cooperated in fighting the Spanish Armada and England supported the Dutch in the early part of the Eighty Years' War by sending money and troops and maintaining garrisons in key ports and a permanent English representative to the Dutch government to ensure coordination of the joint war effort, under the Treaty of Nonsuch. The separate peace in 1604 between England and Spain strained this relationship, although an Anglo-Dutch treaty of 1625, due to remain in force until 1640 was the basis of officially cordial relations between the two countries, and also formed the basis of Charles I of England's Dutch policy.

The weakening of Spanish power at the end of the Thirty Years' War in 1648 also meant that many colonial possessions of the Portuguese and some of the Spanish Empire and their mineral resources were effectively open to conquest by a stronger power. The ensuing rush for empire brought the former allies into conflict, and the Dutch, having made peace with Spain, quickly replaced the English as dominant traders with the Iberian Peninsula, adding to an English resentment about Dutch trade that had steadily grown since 1590. Although the Dutch wished to renew the 1625 treaty, their attempt to do so in 1639 was not responded to, so the treaty lapsed.

By the middle of the 17th century, the Dutch had built by far the largest mercantile fleet in Europe, with more ships than all the other states combined, and their economy, based substantially on maritime commerce, gave them a dominant position in European trade, especially in the North Sea and Baltic. Furthermore, they had conquered most of Portugal's territories and trading posts in the East Indies and Brazil, giving them control over the enormously profitable trade in spices. They were even gaining significant influence over England's trade with her as yet small North American colonies.

The economic disparity between England and the United Provinces increased in part because unlike the English, the Dutch system was based on free trade, making their products more competitive. For example, an English wool trader, who dealt largely with ports in English-speaking America, complained in 1651 that although his English ships would take wool cloth to America to be sold, they could expect to leave American ports with 4,000 to 5,000 bags of wool cloth unsold. Dutch ships, on the other hand, would leave American ports with barely 1,000 bags of wool cloth unsold. Because of this disparity, English trade with her traditional markets in the Baltic, Germany, Russia and Scandinavia withered. During the Wars of the Three Kingdoms, the States General was officially neutral, a policy that antagonised both Parliamentarians and Royalists but which the powerful province of Holland considered most advantageous.

The Dutch also benefitted from the 1648 Peace of Münster which confirmed their independence from Spain and ended the Eighty Years' War, although the Imperial Diet did not formally accept that the Dutch Republic was no longer part of the Holy Roman Empire until 1728. The peace agreement's provisions included a monopoly over trade conducted through the Scheldt estuary, confirming the commercial ascendancy of Amsterdam; Antwerp, part of the Spanish Netherlands and before 1585 the most important port in Northern Europe, would not recover until the late 19th century. This translated into cheaper prices for Dutch products due to a steep and sustained drop in freight charges and insurance rates.

Following the outbreak of the First English Civil War in August 1642, Parliamentarians and Royalists placed an embargo on Dutch ships trading with the opposing side. Since the vast majority of English ports were held by Parliament and the Royalist navy was weak, few Dutch ships were seized although the number steadily rose from 1644 to 1646, causing considerable tension. Despite these embargoes and their extension to Ireland and English colonies in Royalist hands, as late as 1649 the States General, and particularly the maritime provinces of Holland and Zeeland, wished to maintain their lucrative trade with England. Until 1648, Dutch naval vessels also inspected convoys of English ships which, as neutrals, were able to trade with the Spanish Netherlands. They sometimes brought ships into Dutch ports for more thorough examination and, very rarely, confiscated ships and cargoes as contraband.

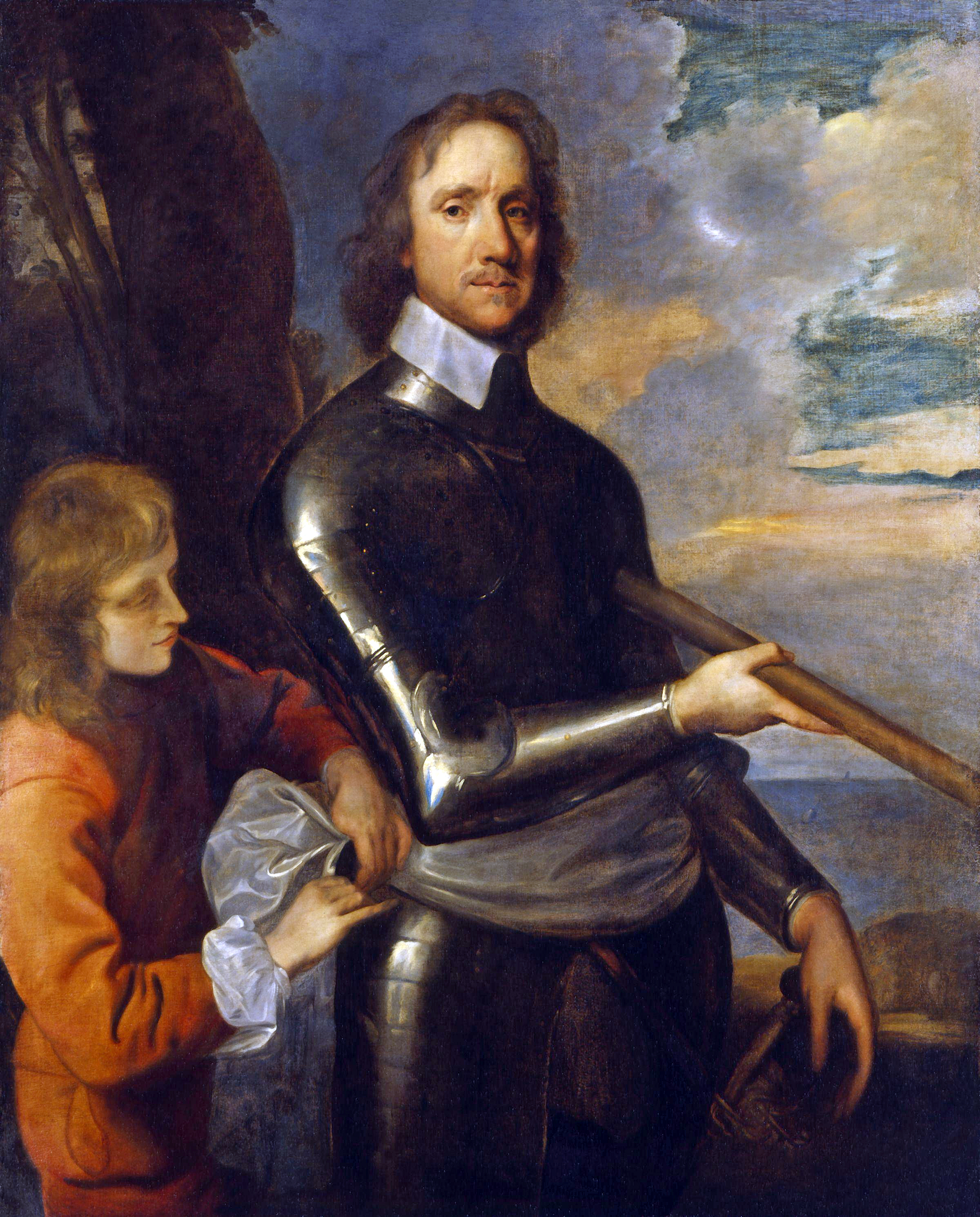
Portrait of Oliver Cromwell, by Robert Walker

The Execution of Charles I in January 1649 resulted in the formation of the Commonwealth of England, which continued to fight Royalists at home and in some of their colonies, leading to an expansion in the English Navy. At the same time, the war played havoc with English trading and shipping. To broadly study their commercial condition, the first Commission of Trade to be established by an Act of Parliament was erected on 1 August 1650. In October 1650, as part of the act to subdue their Royalist colonies and prevent Royalists from fleeing England, Parliament prohibited foreign ships from visiting or trading with any English plantations in America, without license; the act also allowed the seizure of ships violating the prohibition by both the English navy and merchant ships. The act was a temporary war measure hastily enacted and, while it was enacted in general terms to include all countries, it was aimed primarily at the Dutch, and was superseded the following year by a carefully prepared Navigation Act. Writing a century later, Adam Anderson relates of the period that "It had been observed with concern, that the merchants of England for several years past had usually freighted the Hollanders shipping for bringing home their own merchandize, because their freight was at a lower rate than that of English ships. The Dutch shipping were thereby made use of even for importing our own American products; whilst our shipping lay rotting in our harbours; our mariners also for want of employment at home, went into the service of the Hollanders." The English accused the Dutch of profiting from the turmoil of the English Civil War.

=== Opposing fleets ===
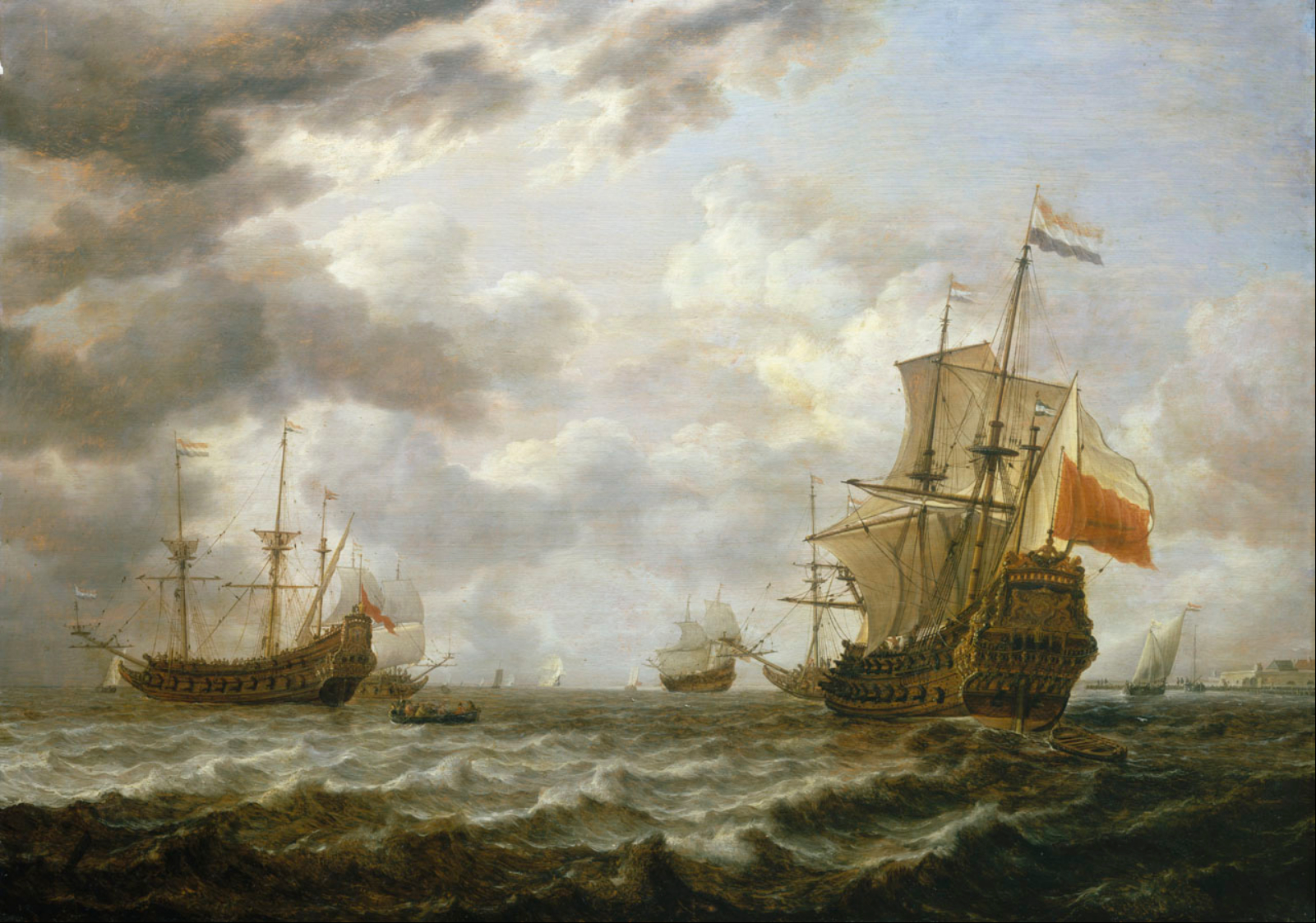
The Brederode, flagship of Dutch admiral Maarten Tromp

The Dutch fleet in the Eighty Years' War had three tasks: as a Battle Force against major Spanish fleets, to convoy Dutch merchant ships and protect its fishing fleet and to actively oppose privateers, particularly those of Dunkirk. In that war, the two latter tasks were more important than major fleet actions, and they required more numerous but smaller warships than the Battle Force, although these smaller ships could also be used in mêlée battles, where boarding rather than gunfire might decide the result. Following their victory over the Spanish fleet at the Battle of the Downs on October 21, 1639, and after peace was made with Spain in 1648, the need for major warships lessened, although smaller ones were still required for convoy service, particularly to the Mediterranean, the East Indies and later to the Caribbean. The financially exhausted Dutch Admiralties allowed their squadrons, and particularly their major warships, to deteriorate.

In the period up to the First Anglo-Dutch War, the Dutch Republic had four sources of warships. The first was the ships of five autonomous Admiralties ("colleges"), three in the province of Holland, which were supported by local taxes on commerce and contributions from the inland provinces. Each Admiralty was responsible for the design, construction, armament and manning of its own ships and the appointment of flag officers for its squadron. The second was the so-called "director's ships" (directieschepen), convoy escorts provided by the burgomasters and merchants of six cities including Amsterdam and Hoorn to protect their Baltic trades. The cities were responsible for providing what were in effect modified and armed merchant ships, appointing their captains and providing crews. The next group were hybrid ships of the Dutch East India Company, which could act as warships or cargo carriers and the last were hired merchant vessels, whose owners had little interest in risking their property. Although captains of the East India Company were generally competent, they were unused to naval discipline, as were the more variable in quality commanders of director's ships and hired merchant ships.

After 1648 the Admiralties sold off many of their larger ships, including Dutch Admiral Maarten Tromp's own flagship, the Aemilia, of 600 tons and fitted with 57 guns. Admiral Tromp was forced to shift his flag to the 600-ton Brederode, of 54 guns. By 1652, the Dutch Admiralties had only 79 ships at their disposal. Many of these ships were in bad repair, with fewer than 50 being seaworthy. All these ships were inferior in firepower to the largest English first and second rate ships. The numerical deficiency in the Dutch navy was to be made up by arming merchantmen.

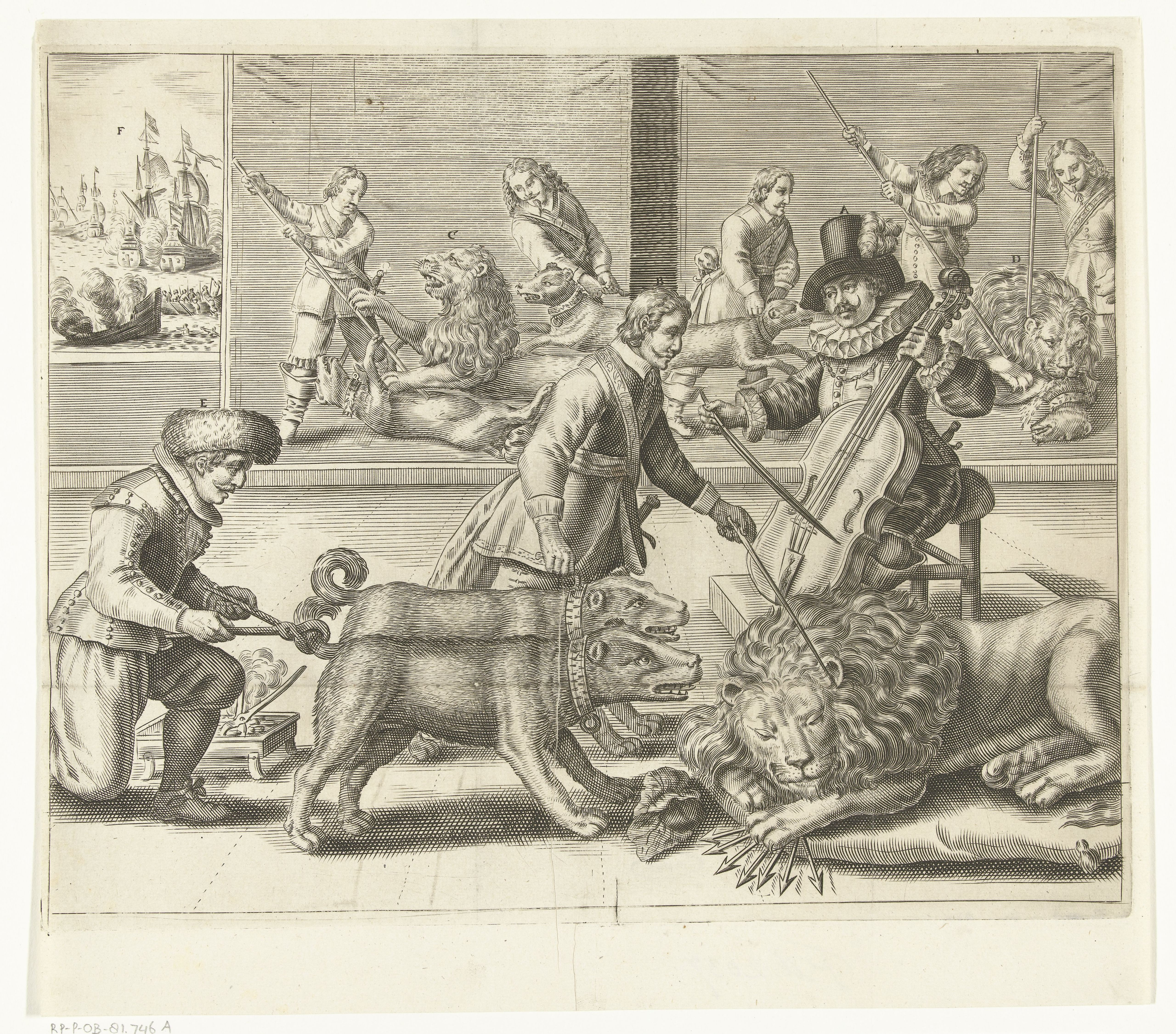
Dutch political cartoon, published in 1652. The Dutch lion is lulled to sleep by the music of the Spanish cello, but is awakened by Cromwell tickling its ear. Two English dogs (mastiffs) bark at the lion, but their tails are being squeezed by the Dutch sailor with a glowing pair of tongs.

The strongest restraint on the number of sailing warships was the large crews required, so fleets were limited by the number of seaman that could be induced or compelled to serve. England had a greater population and employed impressment to make up crew numbers, so could generally maintain more fully crewed ships than the Dutch could. The Dutch partly compensated by hiring foreign sailors from Scandinavia and the Baltic. The English navy of the Commonwealth period was in better condition and was still improving. The Commonwealth had won the English Civil War in 1652 with a strong and effective navy that had supported and supplied Cromwell's army in the wars in Scotland and Ireland; blockaded the Royalist fleet of Prince Rupert in Lisbon; and organised a system of convoys to protect the commerce of the Commonwealth against the numerous privateers based in European ports.

Compared to the Dutch fleet, the English fleet had larger ships of the first and second rates, but proportionately fewer frigates, as the English fleet was principally designed to fight in major actions, whilst providing convoy escorts or fighting privateers was a secondary task. The first and second rate ships included the ageing Resolution and Victory which dated from James I's reign, along with the Sovereign and others from Charles I's navy. However, the Naseby, Richard, Dunbar, and several others were built during the Commonwealth. These were part of a naval expansion financed by an Act of Parliament on 10 November 1650 which imposed a 15% tax on merchant shipping. Between 1649 and 1651 the English fleet included 18 ships that were each superior in firepower to Dutch Admiral Tromp's new flagship Brederode, the largest Dutch ship. All the English ships intended to fight in the battle line were more heavily armed than their equivalents in other European navies, sacrificing freeboard and the ability to use their lower guns in adverse weather in exchange for more powerful ordnance. English ships could fire and hit the enemy at a greater range, and favoured the use of round shot over the chain shot which was popular in other navies.

=== Political tensions ===
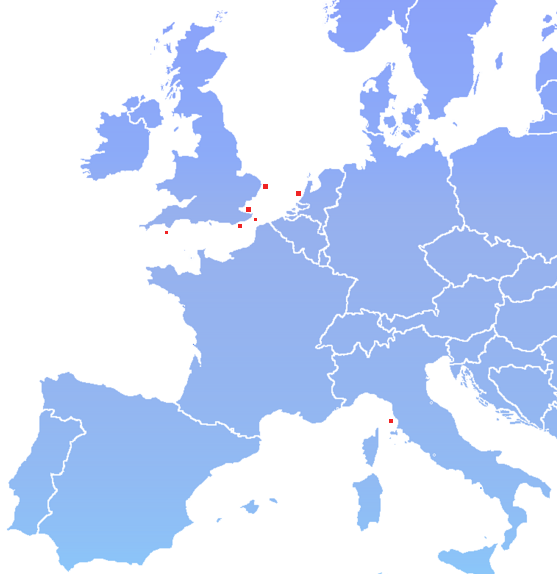
Sites of the major battles of the First Anglo-Dutch War

The commercial tensions between England and the Netherlands were intensified when the English Parliament passed the Navigation Act 1651. This limited Dutch trade with any of the English colonies in America unless the shipping was done in "English bottoms" i.e. English ships. Indeed, any cargo to English ports or the ports of English colonies from anywhere in the world was required to be carried in English ships. Furthermore, the Navigation Act forbade all trade with those English colonies that retained connections and sympathy for the royalist cause of Charles I. To have accepted the terms of the Navigation Act was seen by the Dutch as agreeing to subordinate Dutch trade to the English trading system. This insulted Dutch pride and damaged their economy, but the more immediate cause of the war was the actions of the English navy and privateers against Dutch shipping. In 1651, 140 Dutch merchantmen were seized on the open seas. During January 1652 alone, another 30 Dutch ships were captured at sea and taken to English ports. Protests to England by the States General of the United Provinces were of no avail: the English Parliament showed no inclination toward curbing these seizures of Dutch shipping.

During the English Civil War, the Dutch Stadtholder Frederick Henry had given significant financial support to Charles I of England, to whom he had close family ties. The States General had been generally neutral and refused to become involved with representatives of either king or parliament; it also attempted to mediate between the two sides, an attitude that offended both English Royalists and its parliament. Frederick Henry's influence was lessening with the growth of strongly republican sentiment among the ruling class, and he could not involve the Netherlands in direct support for Charles I, particularly as his country was still at war with Spain.

After the death of Frederick Henry in March 1647, his son, stadtholder William II of Orange, attempted to extend the power of the stadtholderate particularly through maintaining the size of the army, which he commanded and using his supporters in six provinces to outvote Holland, the most prosperous province, in the States General. Following the end of the Eighty Years' War and the execution of his father-in-law, Charles I, William attempted to support the English Royalist cause to an extent that gave concern to even his own followers, and which involved him in disputes with the more committed republicans, particularly those in Holland. The execution of Charles outraged the Orangists, and the Dutch republicans that had attempted to save Charles' life, but the execution did not prevent the States General from continuing a policy of broad neutrality, dealing unofficially with the English parliament while allowing Royalist envoys into the country. The Commonwealth and the Dutch Republic had many things in common: they were both republican and Protestant and many members of States General sympathised with the aims of the English parliamentarians and, while strongly against its regicide, supported a pragmatic policy of neutrality, in opposition to the Royalist-supporting stadtholder. The impasse between the two sides ended with the sudden death of William II in November 1650. His attempts to involve the Netherlands in action against the English Commonwealth in support of the exiled Charles II could have led at least to limited hostilities and possibly outright war and lead to a republican reaction. Shortly before his death, William attempted to gain control of Amsterdam by a coup, and then imprisoned six leading members of the States of Holland, but they were released when he died. These six led the province of Holland to assume the leadership of the republican movement, the Loevestein faction, which saw the Netherlands as a free republic without a stadholder. The resulting First Stadtholderless period began when William II died in 1650, although it was not until January 1651 that the last of the seven provinces agreed to it.

=== English delegation to The Hague ===
As early as 1643, Oliver St John had urged fellow Protestants in the Netherlands to sign the Solemn League and Covenant that the Scots had already signed, but had been rebuffed. After the execution of Charles I in 1649, parliament sent an envoy to the Hague to discuss an alliance with the United Provinces, but he was murdered shortly after his arrival in reprisal for the king's death, after which the proposal was left in abeyance until more favourable times. The sudden death on 6 November 1650 of William II, the Stadholder of the United Provinces, whose popularity had declined since his election in 1647 in the face of growing discontent from the States Party in the United Provinces, changed matters. The States party was the political faction identified most closely with the idea of rule solely by the States General, and was especially powerful in the large commercially oriented province of Holland. To obtain support against William II, it had sought the assistance of Oliver Cromwell. After William II's death, the States Party was in a much stronger position politically, and no longer valued or needed Cromwell's support against the stadholderate.

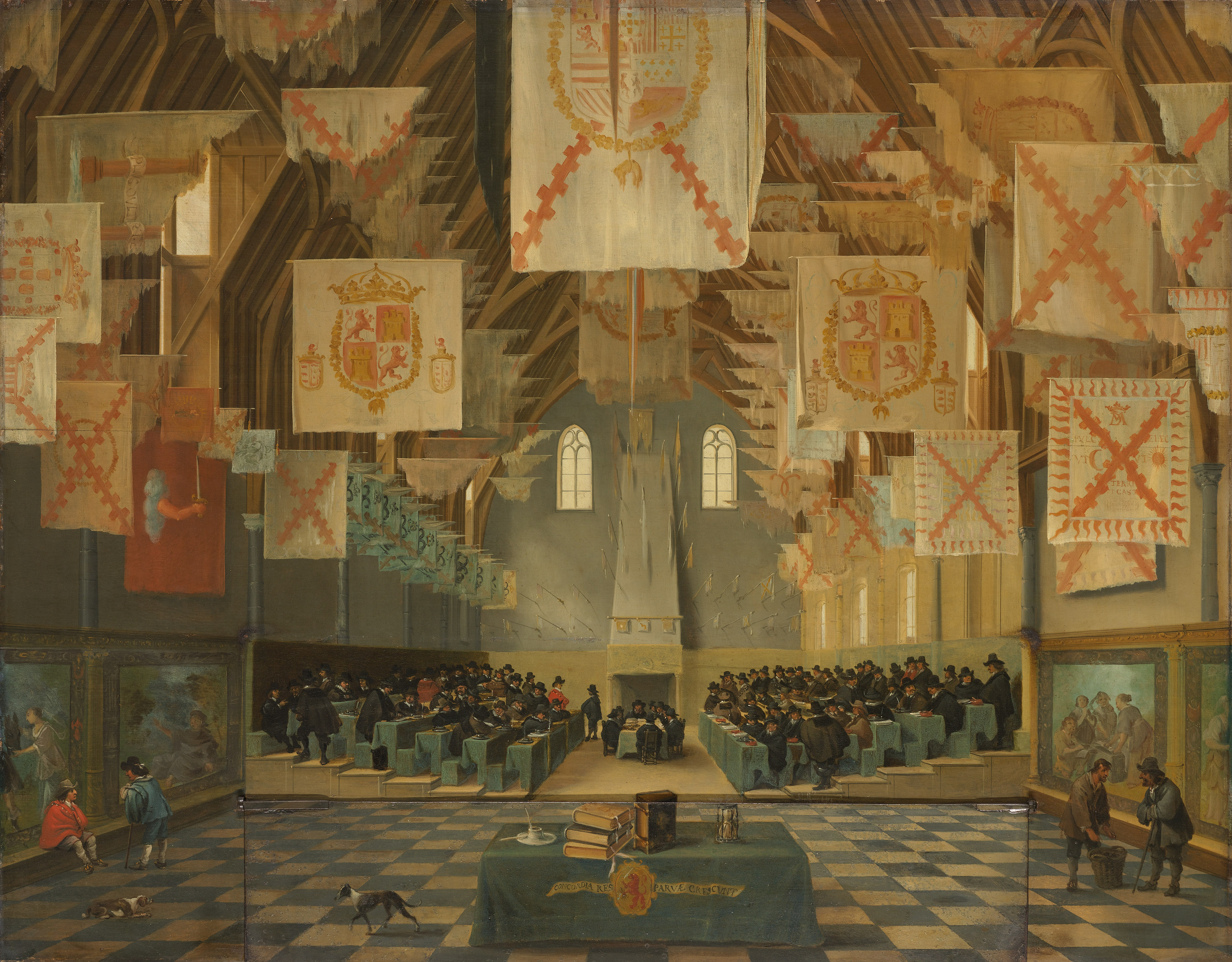
The Great Assembly of the States General, in the Great Hall of the Binnenhof (painting by Dirck van Delen, 1651, formerly attributed to Bartholomeus van Bassen)

In January 1651, the English Council of State, aware that the Netherlands States General was about to recognise the Commonwealth as the legitimate English government, which it did on 28 January, prepared an embassy to the republic headed by Oliver St John, with two envoys extraordinary. When it arrived in The Hague on 7 March 1651, the English delegation made it clear that their aim was to "enter into a more strict and intimate alliance and union' with the republic" to be effected by "a Confederation of the two Commonwealths". and based on proposal put in 1648 by a parliamentary envoy that the Dutch had declined to consider. Any Dutch expectation that recognising the Commonwealth would end dissent between the two countries was disabused and, based on the earlier proposal, the States General drew up a draft of 36 articles, the first eleven of which were the subject of intensive discussion. By June the Dutch believed that agreement had been reached on those points, and the English delegation announced their imminent departure, leaving on 2 July.

During their three-month stay, other events had convinced the English delegation of Dutch animosity. The Hague was the residence of the young widow of William II, Charles I's daughter Mary Henrietta Stuart, the Princess Royal. Her presence attracted exiled English noblemen not fighting with her brother Charles to The Hague, which had for many years been an Orangist stronghold. The delegation appointed by the Commonwealth, could only leave their lodgings under armed escort, for fear of being assaulted by Royalists or large Orangist mobs in their pay. When the English delegates left in the last week of June, they reported that the Dutch were untrustworthy and that the United Provinces were under the control of the Orangist party and thus a threat to the security of the Commonwealth. Although the States of Holland and West Friesland were unwilling, if not unable, to suppress the activities of English Royalists, Orangists that deplored the execution of Charles I, and certain strict Calvinist ministers opposing Cromwell's religious innovations, it would have been more logical for him to ally with the ruling republican regents to overcome the pro-Stuart Orangists than go to war, were economic issues not more pressing.

Following the departure of St John, the States General sent a delegation to London to continue discussions. However, after the Battle of Worcester in September 1651, the radical element in the English parliament became stronger and the group including Cromwell that genuinely favoured an alliance with the Netherlands was outnumbered by those wanting either to cripple Dutch trade without going to war or to provoke a war with the Dutch republic for political reasons. The Dutch considered that the economic provisions of the 36 articles they had drafted could form the basis of a trade agreement without compromising the independence of the United Provinces or their becoming involved in a war with Spain, but it soon became apparent that the English negotiators were most concerned to ensure Dutch action against English Royalists and restrictions on the Dutch carrying trade between third countries. The armed confrontation between Tromp and Blake off Dover took place before these issues were settled, and the English immediately halted negotiations and refused to reopen them when the Dutch offered concessions, preferring war.

=== Path to war ===
In England, after 1648 and more particularly after Charles' execution and the proclamation of the Commonwealth, the army assumed a more prominent political role compared with parliament.

The neutralisation of Rupert's fleet and its bases, the defeat of the Irish Royalists at Rathmines and Drogheda in 1649 and of the Scots at the Battle of Dunbar in 1650 made the Commonwealth more assertive in its relations with the Dutch, both on trade and on William II's support for the Stuart cause. French support for the English Royalists had led the Commonwealth to commence the issuing of letters of marque against French ships and against French goods in neutral ships in December 1649. Dozens of neutral Dutch ships were detained near French ports by English ships operating under letters of marque, and some of these were seized. Dutch concerns were further raised by an English embargo on Dutch trade with Scotland declared soon after.

In 1649 and 1650, General-at-Sea Robert Blake drove the Royalist fleet under Prince Rupert from its bases in Ireland and pursued it to the port of Lisbon, where it was protected by the harbour's forts and the Portuguese king's refusal to let Blake enter the port. The Council of State decided to reinforce Blake and authorised him to seize ships from Brazil in reprisal, and to withdraw the English envoy to Portugal, whose departure in July 1650 created a state of war. In response to the Portuguese failure to expel Rupert, Blake continued to seize merchant ships entering the River Tagus from Brazil. On 24 September 1650 Blake attacked a fleet of 23 merchant vessels from Brazil and their naval escort, sinking the Portuguese Admiral and capturing the Vice-Admiral and ten of the larger merchant ships. The Portuguese court were compelled to insist that Rupert leave Lisbon harbour in September 1650, but after finding Blake waiting for him, Rupert placed his ships under the protection of Portuguese coastal forts, where he remained until December, when he escaped to the West Indies. The threat of the Royalist fleet had been neutralised by forcing it into retreat. Its strongholds in the Isles of Scilly, the Isle of Man and the Channel Islands were captured in 1651. This was followed in 1652 by the recovery of England's colonial possessions in the West Indies and North America by General George Ayscue.

Infuriated by the treatment of the English delegation in the Hague and emboldened by their victory against Charles II and his forces at the Battle of Worcester on September 3, 1651, the English Parliament, as noted above, passed the first of the Navigation Acts in October 1651. It ordered that only English ships and ships from the originating country could import goods to England. This measure, as also noted above, was particularly aimed at hampering the shipping of the highly trade-dependent Dutch and often used as a pretext simply to take their ships; as General Monck put it: "The Dutch have too much trade, and the English are resolved to take it from them." Agitation among the Dutch merchants was further increased by George Ayscue's capture in early 1652 of 27 Dutch ships trading with the Royalist colony of Barbados in contravention of the trade prohibition imposed by the Commonwealth. Over a hundred other Dutch ships were captured by English privateers between October 1651 and July 1652. Moreover, the death of Dutch Stadtholder William II, who had favoured an expansion of the army at the expense of the navy, had led to a change in Dutch defence policy towards protecting the great trading concerns of Amsterdam and Rotterdam. Accordingly, the States General decided on 3 March 1652 to expand the fleet by hiring and equipping 150 merchant ships as ships of war to allow effective convoying against hostile English actions. Although the States of Holland stressed that this measure was intended defensive and it carefully selected its captains and issued prudent instructions about saluting English warships, when news of this decision reached London on 12 March 1652, it was seen as a provocative move.

== War ==
The Commonwealth began to prepare for war, but as both nations were unready, war might have been delayed if not for an unfortunate encounter between the fleets of Dutch Lieutenant-Admiral Maarten Tromp and General at Sea Robert Blake in the English Channel near Dover on 29 May 1652. An ordinance of Cromwell required all foreign fleets in the North Sea or the Channel to dip their flag in salute, reviving an ancient right the English had long insisted on. Tromp himself was fully aware of the need to give this mark of courtesy, but partly through a misunderstanding and partly out of resentment among the seamen, it was not given promptly, and Blake opened fire, starting the brief Battle of Dover. Tromp lost two ships but escorted his convoy to safety.

The States of Holland sent their highest official, the Grand Pensionary Adriaan Pauw, to London in a last desperate attempt to prevent war, but in vain: English demands had become so extreme that no self-respecting state could meet them. War was declared by the English Parliament on 10 July 1652. The Dutch diplomats realised what was at stake: one of the departing ambassadors said, "The English are about to attack a mountain of gold; we are about to attack a mountain of iron." The Dutch Orangists were jubilant however; they expected that either victory or defeat would bring them to power.

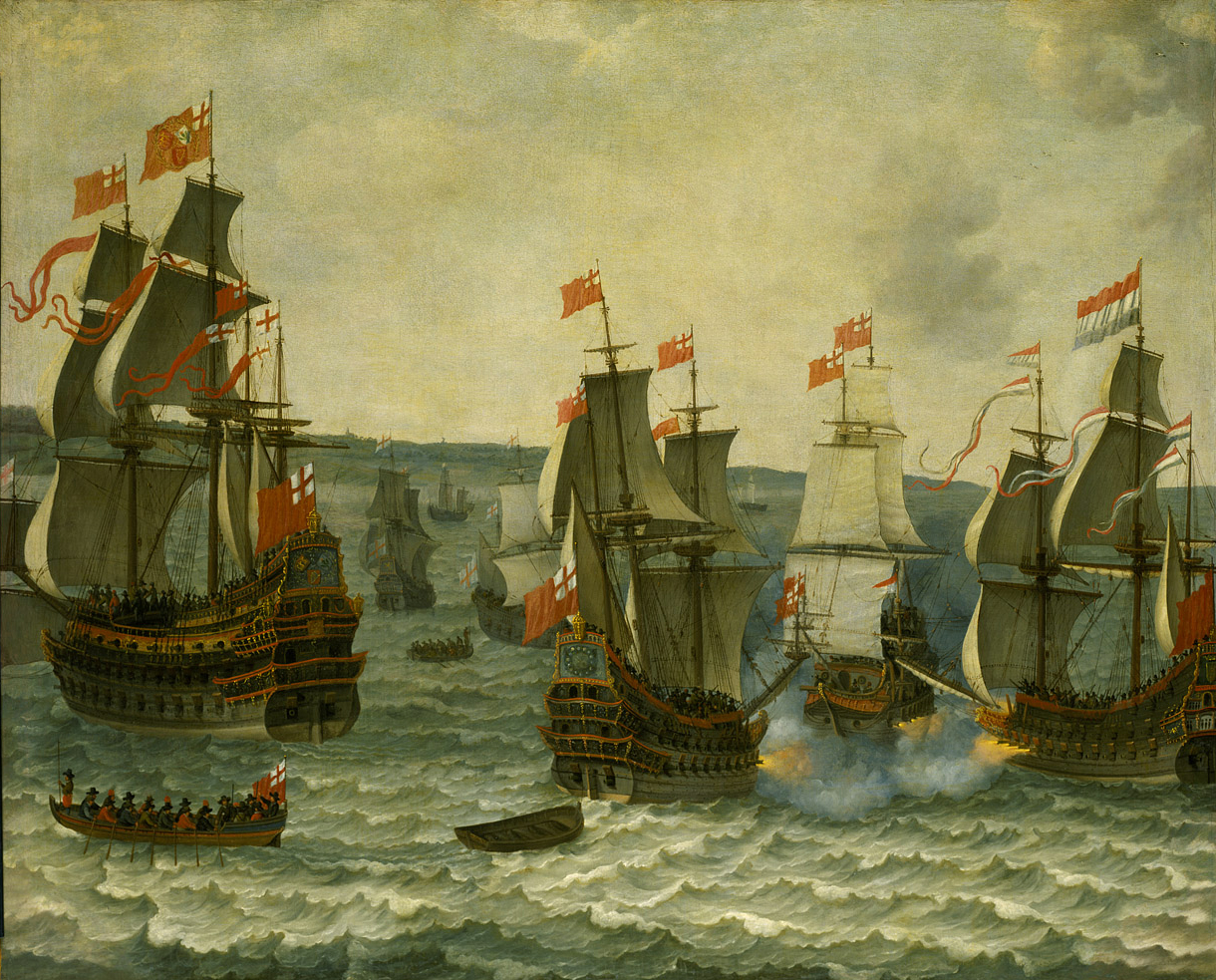
Action between ships in the First Dutch War, 1652–1654 by Abraham Willaerts, which may depict the Battle of the Kentish Knock. It is a pastiche of popular subjects of naval painting of the time showing the Brederode (right) duels Resolution and Sovereign (far left).

The first months of the war saw English attacks against the Dutch convoys. Blake was sent with 60 ships to disrupt Dutch fishing in the North Sea and Dutch trade with the Baltic, leaving Ayscue with a small force to guard the Channel. On 12 July 1652, Ayscue intercepted a Dutch convoy returning from Portugal, capturing seven merchantmen and destroying three. Tromp gathered a fleet of 96 ships to attack Ayscue, but southerly winds kept him in the North Sea. Turning north to pursue Blake, Tromp caught up with the English fleet off the Shetland Islands, but a storm scattered his ships and there was no battle. On 26 August 1652, an outward-bound Dutch convoy with an escort of director's ships from Zeeland commanded by Michiel de Ruyter, who held the rank of commandeur, broadly equivalent to commodore was sighted by Ayscue, with a more numerous squadron of warships and armed merchant ships. Ayscue attempted to attack the convoy with around nine of his strongest and fastest warships, but De Ruyter counter-attacked and, in the Battle of Plymouth, surrounded the English warships which were not supported by their armed merchant ships. The convoy escaped, Ayscue was relieved of his command and de Ruyter gained prestige in his first independent command.

Tromp had also been suspended after the failure in Shetland, and Vice-Admiral Witte de With was given command. The Dutch convoys being at the time safe from English attack, De With saw an opportunity to concentrate his forces and gain control of the seas. At the Battle of the Kentish Knock on 8 October 1652 the Dutch attacked the English fleet near the mouth of the River Thames, but were beaten back with many casualties. The English Parliament, believing the Dutch to be near defeat, sent away twenty ships to strengthen the position in the Mediterranean. This division of forces left Blake with only 42 men of war by November, while the Dutch were making every effort to reinforce their fleet. This division led to an English defeat by Tromp in the Battle of Dungeness in December, while it failed to save the English Mediterranean fleet, largely destroyed at the Battle of Leghorn in March 1653.

The Dutch had effective control of the Channel, the North Sea, and the Mediterranean, with English ships blockaded in port. As a result, Cromwell convinced Parliament to begin secret peace negotiations with the Dutch. In February 1653, Adriaan Pauw responded favourably, sending a letter from the States of Holland indicating their sincere desire to reach a peace agreement. However, these discussions, which were only supported by a bare majority of members of the Rump parliament, dragged on without much progress for almost a year.

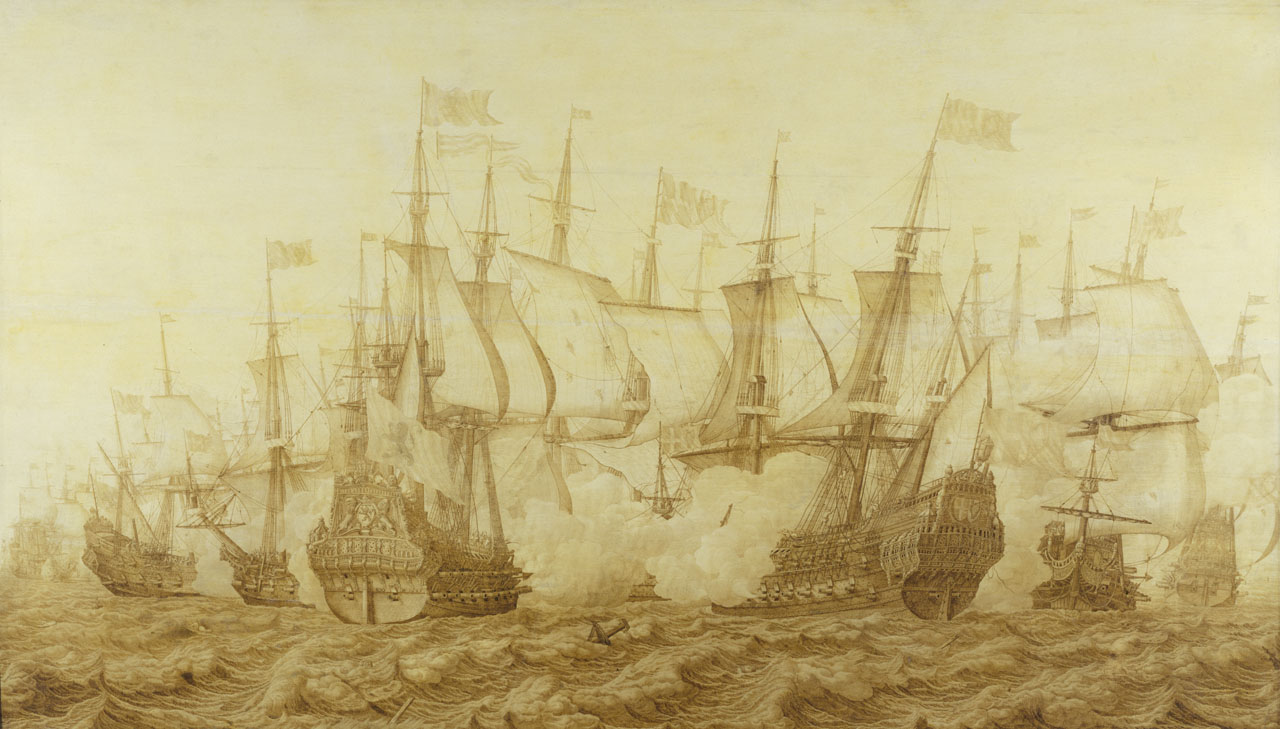
The Battle of the Gabbard, 12 June 1653 by Heerman Witmont, shows the Dutch flagship Brederode, right, in action with the Resolution.

Though the politicians were close to ending the conflict, the naval war continued and, over the winter of 1652–53, the English fleet repaired its ships and considered its tactics. All of the sea battles fought in 1652 were chaotic, with boarding and capturing enemy ships a favoured tactic, particularly of the Dutch. Squadrons or even individual ships fought without regard to the rest of the fleet, although the English fleet instructions of 1650 emphasised the importance of supporting other ships of the same squadron, particularly the flagship. In the first major battle of 1653, the English fleet challenged the Dutch in the three-day Battle of Portland, which began in 28 February. They captured at least 20 Dutch merchant ships, captured or destroyed at least eight and possibly twelve warships and drove the Dutch from the Channel. Like the battles of 1652, this was chaotic, but the most notable tactical events happened in the first day, when Tromp led the whole Dutch fleet against about two dozen English ships at the rear of the fleet, hoping to overpower them before the bulk of the English fleet could come to their aid. However, the outnumbered English ships extemporised a line ahead formation and managed to keep the Dutch at bay through coordinated heavy gunfire.

Whether as a direct result of the Battle of Portland or the accumulation of experience gained over some years, in March 1653, Robert Blake wrote the Sailing and Fighting Instructions, a major overhaul of English naval tactics, containing the first formal description of the line of battle. The success of this new formation was evident in the Battle of the Gabbard in June 1653, when the English fleet not only defeated the Dutch in a long-range artillery duel but suffered so little damage that it could maintain a blockade rather than sending many ships to port for repairs. The Dutch, in contrast, relied less on linear tactics, preferring to close with English ships to board and capture then as late as the Battle of Lowestoft in 1665, and they also retained numbers of slow and badly armed hired merchant ships in their fleet as late as that battle, when the English fleet was already questioning their use.

In mid-March 1653, the States of Holland sent a detailed peace proposal to the English Rump Parliament, where it generated a fierce debate and a slim majority for a response to be made. The response made first to the States of Holland and then to the States General in April was critical of the Dutch proposals, but at least allowed discussions to start. Little was achieved until both the Rump Parliament and its short-lived successor the Nominated Parliament had been dissolved, the latter in December 1653. The following month the States General asked for negotiations to be restarted and in May Cromwell agreed to receive Dutch envoys in London. In mid June, Johan de Witt persuaded the States General to send commissioners to London to negotiate peace terms and Cromwell was receptive, although he was insistent that the Dutch republic must ensure the House of Orange would not become dominant again, and declined to repeal the Navigation Act.

Cromwell again put forward his plan for a political union between the two nations to the four Dutch envoys who had arrived in London in late June, but they emphatically rejected this. He also wished to avoid further conflict with the Dutch Republic, as it was planning war with Spain. Cromwell then proposed a military alliance against Spain, promising to repeal the Navigation Act in return for Dutch assistance in the conquest of Spanish America: this too was rejected. Cromwell then fell back on a proposal of 27 articles, two of which were unacceptable to the Dutch: that all Royalists had to be expelled, and that Denmark, the ally of the Republic, should be abandoned in its war against Sweden. In the end Cromwell accepted that the 25 agreed articles would form the basis for peace.

Meanwhile, the English navy tried to gain control over the North Sea, and in the two-day Battle of the Gabbard in June drove the Dutch back to their home ports with the loss of 17 warships captured or destroyed, starting a blockade of the Dutch coast, which led to a crippling of the Dutch economy. The Dutch were unable to feed their dense urban population without a regular supply of Baltic wheat and rye; prices of these commodities soared and the poor were soon unable to buy food, and starvation ensued.

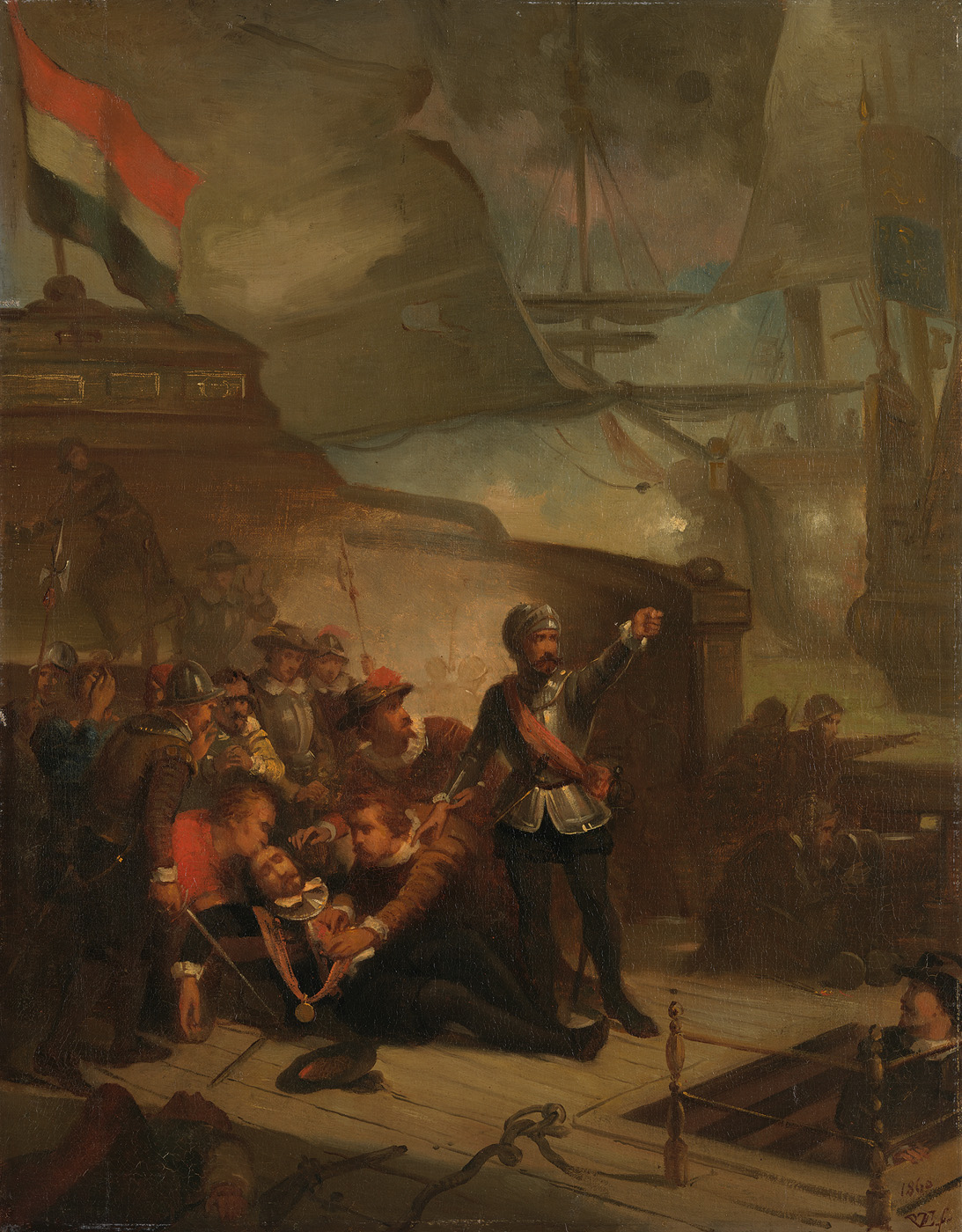
A 19th-century depiction of Maarten Tromp's death at the Battle of Scheveningen

The final battle of the war was the hard-fought and bloody Battle of Scheveningen in August, fought because the Dutch were desperate to break the English blockade. This was a tactical victory for the English fleet, which captured or destroyed at least a dozen and possibly 27 Dutch warships for the loss of two or three English ones, and captured or killed some 2,000 men including Tromp, who was killed early in the battle, for a loss of 500 English dead. However, despite their heavy losses of men and ships, the Dutch fleet was able to retreat to the Texel, and the English had to abandon their blockade, so the Dutch achieved their aim. The death of Tromp was a blow to Dutch morale, which increased the Dutch desire to end the war: similar feelings arose in England. Although many had been enriched by the war, trade as a whole had suffered. However, in September, the Dutch fleet, under Witte de With, was able to resume its operations. It successfully disembarked 400 merchant ships and returned with an equivalent number, all carrying valuable goods from the East Indies, which demonstrated the reopening of the sea routes.

Allied with Denmark and maintaining a formidable presence at the Danish Sound, the Dutch effectively put an end to English trade in the Baltic region. Throughout 1653, not a single English vessel passed through the Sound. In the Mediterranean, the Dutch had achieved similar success. Additionally, in the East Indies, the Dutch East India Company had swiftly established maritime dominance, spanning from the Persian Gulf to the South China Sea. The English agent at Livorno, Charles Longland, reported to London, that the Dutch had been heavily defeated in home waters but added yet our losses here have been so visible to all Europe, Asia and Africa that they will not believe but that our condition is as bad at home. After Scheveningen, the Dutch also turned to using smaller warships and commerce raiding with the result that, by November Cromwell, despite military success in the North Sea, was anxious to make peace as the Dutch were capturing numerous English merchant ships.

Despite this the Dutch Republic was also unable to sustain a prolonged naval war as English privateers inflicted serious damage on Dutch shipping. At the time the Dutch merchant fleet was three times larger than the English, and it is estimated that the Dutch lost between 1,000 and 1,700 vessels (the most reliable estimate is from Amsterdam Burgomasters who claimed the Dutch lost 1,200) of all sizes to privateers in this war. This accounted for 8% of the total Dutch mercantile fleet, amounted to double the value of England's entire ocean-going merchant fleet. These losses were three to four times as many as the English lost (440 ships in total), and more than the total Dutch losses for the other two Anglo-Dutch wars in the 17th century. This was the greatest single maritime disaster suffered by the Dutch world Entrepôt during its great age. In addition, as press-ganging was forbidden, enormous sums had to be paid to attract enough sailors to man the fleet. The Dutch were unable to defend all of their colonies and it had too few colonists or troops in Dutch Brazil to prevent the more numerous Portuguese, dissatisfied by Dutch rule, from reconquest. In Holland itself the war took its toll – shipping businesses had ceased trading and work was hard to find. In Amsterdam fifteen hundred houses were untenanted, many observed a large number of roaming beggars and grass was growing in the streets. The condition of the country had left the Dutch no choice but to accept Cromwells terms.

Peace negotiations continued until March 1654 when Cromwell demanded a change in that the then-four-year-old Prince of Orange should be excluded from future government appointments, like the stadtholderate, or the captaincy-general of the States Army. This was at first rejected, but the Dutch eventually accepted, and Peace was declared on 15 April 1654 with the signing of the Treaty of Westminster and ratified by all parties by 22 April.

== Aftermath ==
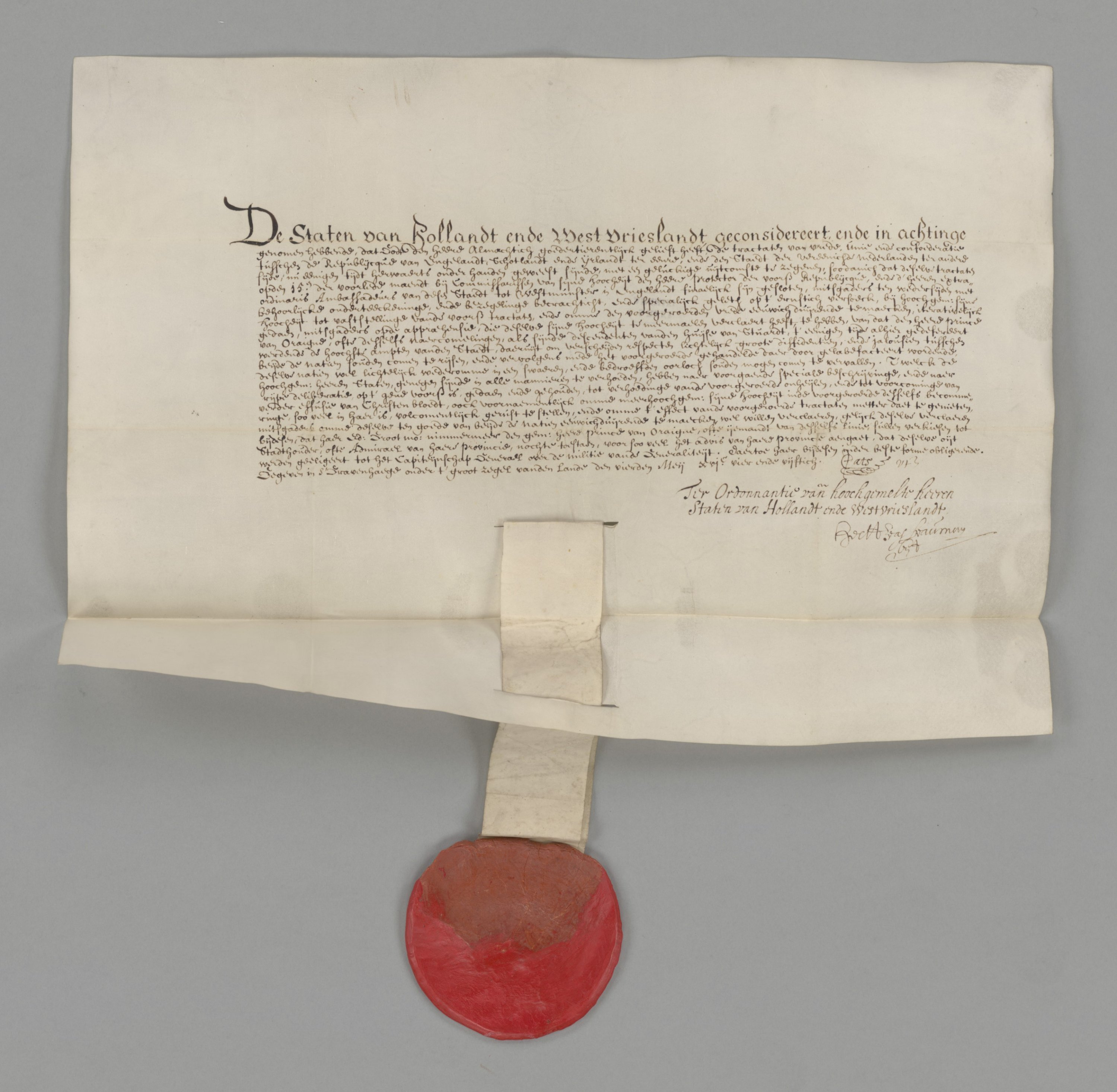
The Act of Seclusion

The Dutch were saved from harsh peace. In part to the leniency of Cromwell, (Note: With tears in his eyes and invoking God, Cromwell had declared to the Dutch envoys in London that nothing had grieved him more than this war.) but also because he feared a longer war, along with the massive economic damage to the English maritime economy. The Dutch nevertheless realized few of the objectives in their 36 articles, and had to make a few minor concessions - the acceptance of the Act of Navigation which excluded their merchants from all commerce between England and its colonies, an indemnity of £85,000 for losses of the EIC in the East Indies and £3,615 which had to be paid to the heirs of the victims of the Amboyna massacre. The island of Run in the East Indies was to be ceded to the East India Company, although the Dutch never actually returned the island. Lastly, a symbolic gesture; saluting the flag of English warships in the Channel.

Cromwell's original political aim of a union that would subordinate the Dutch was dropped; instead the main concession which he desired bore no role in the original reason for going to war. This was the sole condition that the Dutch had to agree that no Prince of Orange or other member of the House of Orange should hold the office of Stadtholder or any other public office in the Netherlands, a demand that was strongly opposed by Orangists, but in the interests of the Dutch States Party, led by Johan de Witt. Although this was not part of the formal peace treaty, the two members of the negotiating team from the province of Holland agreed to a secret annexe providing that England would only ratify the treaty after the States of Holland had passed an Act of Seclusion, excluding the House of Orange from holding public office in that province: this legislation was passed in May 1654. There was an adverse reaction from several of the other Dutch provinces, but their provincial assemblies could neither overcome their own internal divisions nor coordinate opposition with other provinces. However, although they did not enact their own Exclusion legislation then, in practice they did not oppose it. Only after the Second Anglo-Dutch War did four other provinces besides Holland adopt the Perpetual Edict (1667) sanctioning Exclusion.

England celebrated the peace but it was also a relief - Cromwell proclaimed 23 May 1654 to be a day of Thanksgiving. The English made some small gains out of the peace treaty, while not making any concessions to the Dutch, but the strong commercial position of the Dutch Republic remained largely intact and the rivalry between the two nations was not resolved. Especially in their emerging overseas colonies, hostilities continued between Dutch and English trading companies, which had warships and troops of their own.

The English soon took advantage of their new ships seized from the Dutch to implement a merchant fleet on similar lines to the Dutch, particularly the effort to build more flyboats. The Dutch too had started on a major shipbuilding programme to remedy the lack of ships of the line evident at the battles of the Kentish Knock, the Gabbard, and Scheveningen. The admiralties were now forbidden by law to sell off these sixty new ships. When in 1665 the Second Anglo-Dutch War started the Dutch were thus much better prepared.

== See also ==
- Second Anglo-Dutch War
- Third Anglo-Dutch War
- Three Hundred and Thirty Five Years' War

== Sources ==
- Algra, Hendrik; Algra, Ale (1956). Dispereert niet: Twintig eeuwen historie van de Nederlanden [Despair not: Twenty centuries of the history of the Netherlands] (in Dutch). T. Wever.
- Blok, Petrus Johannes (1925). Geschiedenis van het Nederlandsche volk. Deel 3 [History of the Dutch nation. Volume 3] (in Dutch).
- Brandon, Pepijn (2015). Capital, and the Dutch State (1588–1795). Brill.
- Boxer, Charles (1957). The Dutch In Brazil. Oxford: Clarendon Press.
- Bruijn, Jaap R (2011). The Dutch Navy of the Seventeenth and Eighteenth Centuries. Oxford: Oxford University Press. ISBN 978-1-78694-890-8.
- Bruijn, Jaap R (2016). The Raison d'Etre and Actual Employment of the Dutch Navy in Early Modern Times. Woodbridge: Boydell Press. ISBN 978-1-78327-098-9.
- Bruijn, Jaap R (2017). The Dutch Navy of the Seventeenth and Eighteenth Centuries. Liverpool University Press. ISBN 9781786948908.
- Butel, Paul (2002). The Atlantic. Taylor and Francis. ISBN 9781134843046.
- Cafruny, Alan W (2023). Ruling the Waves The Political Economy of International Shipping. University of California Press. ISBN 9780520331679.
- Coward, Barry (2002). The Cromwellian Protectorate. Manchester: Manchester University Press. ISBN 978-0-71904-317-8.
- Davis, Ralph (2012). The Rise of the English Shipping Industry in the Seventeenth and Eighteenth Centuries. St John's, Newfoundland: International Maritime Economic History Association. ISBN 978-0-98649-738-4.
- Fox, Frank L (2009). The Four Days' Battle of 1666. Barnsley: Seaforth Publishing. ISBN 978-1-52673-727-4.
- Geyl, Pieter (1948). Geschiedenis van de Nederlandse stam [History of the Dutch tribe] (in Dutch).
- Godwin, William (2009). History of the Commonwealth, Volume 3. London: Seaforth Publishing. ISBN 978-1-52673-727-4.
- Groenveld, Simon (1987). "The English Civil Wars As a Cause of the First Anglo-Dutch War, 1640–1652". The Historical Journal. 66 (2): 83–109. JSTOR 2639159.
- Harding, Richard (2002). Seapower and Naval Warfare, 1650–1830. Taylor & Francis. ISBN 9781135364861.
- 't Hart, Marjolein (2014). The Dutch Wars of Independence Warfare and Commerce in the Netherlands 1570–1680. Taylor & Francis. ISBN 9781317812548.
- Hugill, Peter J (1993). World Trade Since 1431 Geography, Technology, and Capitalism. Johns Hopkins University Press. ISBN 9780801851261.
- Israel, Jonathan I (1995). The Dutch Republic: Its Rise, Greatness and Fall, 1477–1806. Oxford: Clarendon Press. ISBN 0-19-873072-1.
- Israel, Jonathan I (1997). "England, the Dutch Republic, and Europe in the Seventeenth Century". The Historical Journal. 40 (4): 541–566. doi:10.1017/S0018246X97007450. S2CID 161904554.
- Israel, Jonathan (1989). Dutch Primacy in World Trade, 1585–1740 (E-book ed.). Clarendon Press. ISBN 9780191591822.
- Jones, James Rees (1996). The Anglo-Dutch Wars of the Seventeenth Century. Longman. ISBN 9780582056312.
- Kennedy, Paul M (1976). The Rise and Fall of British Sea Mastery. New York: Scribner. ISBN 0-684-14609-6.
- Low, Charle R (1872). The Great Battles of the British Navy. London: Routledge.
- Mckay, Derek; Scott, H M (2014). The Rise of the Great Powers 1648–1815 (E-book). Taylor & Francis. ISBN 9781317872849.
- Manganiello, Stephen C (2004). The Concise Encyclopedia of the Revolutions and Wars of England, Scotland, and Ireland, 1639–1660. Scarecrow Press. ISBN 9780810851009.
- Maland, David (1980). Europe at War, 1600–1650. Macmillan. ISBN 9780847662135.
- Moote, Alanson Lloyd (1970). The Seventeenth Century; Europe in Ferment. D C Heath.
- Munck, Thomas (2017). Seventeenth-Century Europe State, Conflict and Social Order in Europe 1598–1700. Macmillan Education UK. ISBN 9780230209725.
- Palmer, A J (1987). "The 'Military Revolution' Afloat: The Era of the Anglo-Dutch Wars and the Transition to Modern Warfare at Sea". War in History. 4 (2): 123–149. doi:10.1177/096834459700400201. JSTOR 26004420. S2CID 159657621.
- Peifer, Douglas C (2013). "Maritime Commerce Warfare: The Coercive Response of the Weak?". Naval War College Review. 30 (3): 83–109.
- Pincus, Steven C A (2002). Protestantism and Patriotism: Ideologies and the Making of English Foreign Policy, 1650–1688. Cambridge: Cambridge University Press. ISBN 978-0-52189-368-8.
- Prak, Maarten (2023). The Dutch Republic in the Seventeenth Century. Cambridge University Press. ISBN 9781009240604.
- Rommelse, Gijs (2006). The Second Anglo-Dutch War (1665–1667). Hilversum: Verloren. ISBN 978-9-06550-907-9.
- Rowen, Herbert H (1990). The Princes of Orange: The Stadholders in the Dutch Republic. Cambridge: Cambridge University Press. ISBN 978-0-52139-653-0.
- Rowen, Herbert H (2003). John de Witt Statesman of the 'True Freedom'. Cambridge University Press. ISBN 9780521527088.
- Seel, Graham E (2005). The English Wars and Republic, 1637–1660. Taylor & Francis. ISBN 9781134638581.
- Wilson, Peter H (2009). Europe's Tragedy: A History of the Thirty Years War. Allen Lane. ISBN 978-0-7139-9592-3.
- Van Lennep, Jacob (1880). De geschiedenis van Nederland, aan het Nederlandsche Volk verteld [The history of the Netherlands, told to the Dutch nation] (in Dutch). Leiden; z j.
