= Leghorn =

Leghorn may refer to:

- Livorno, an Italian port city in Tuscany, traditionally known in English as Leghorn
- Leghorn, a type of straw-plaited fabric
- Leghorn chicken, a breed of chicken from Tuscany
- The naval Battle of Leghorn, 1653, during the First Anglo-Dutch War
- Foghorn Leghorn, a Looney Tunes character
