= HMS Royal Charles (1660) =

Ship of the line of the Royal Navy

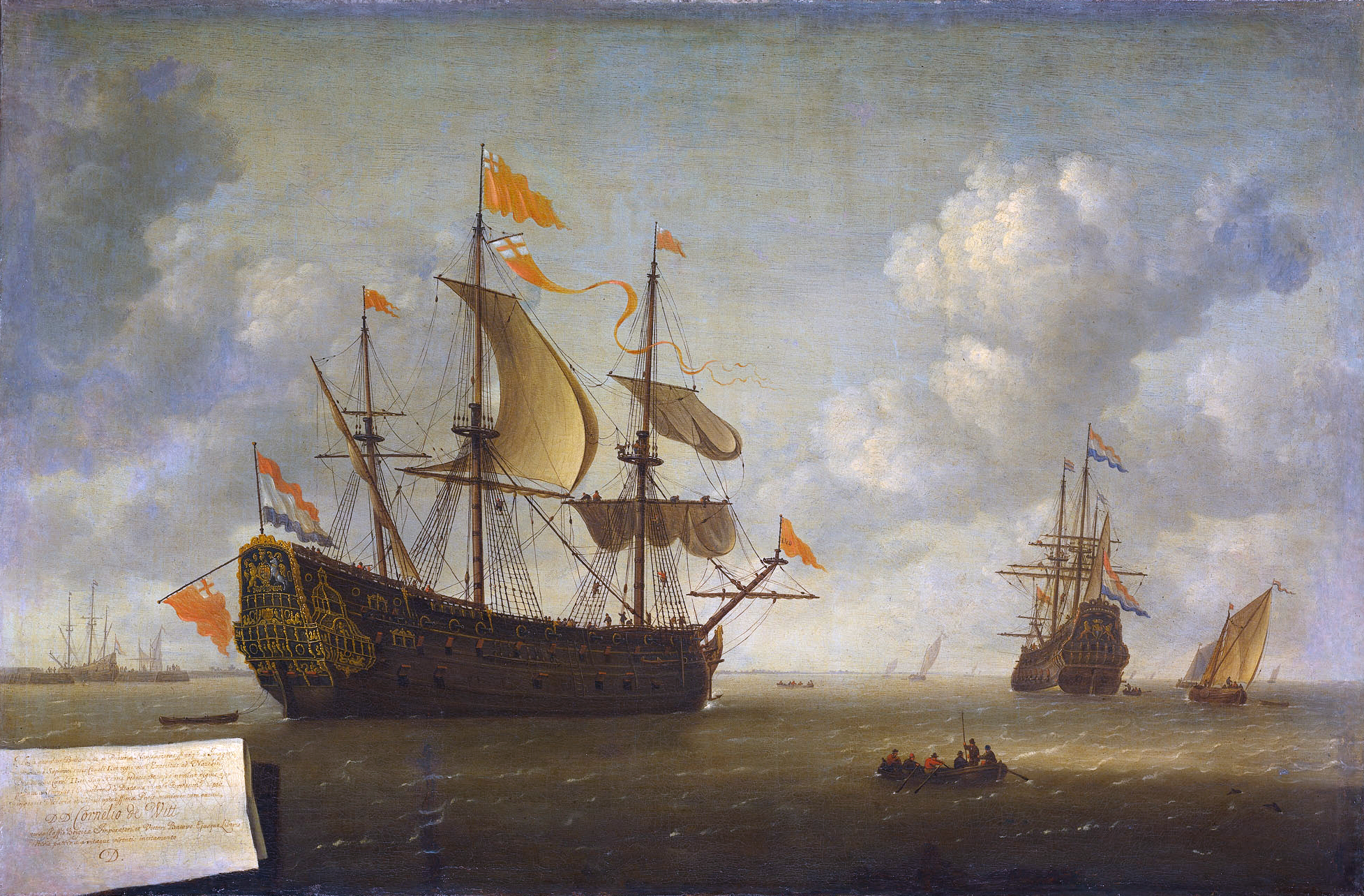
- Royal Charles off Hellevoetsluis, captured by the Dutch after the Raid on the Medway, June 1667. Jeronymus van Diest (II).

History

England
- Name: Naseby
- Ordered: 3 July 1654
- Builder: Peter Pett II, Woolwich Dockyard
- Launched: 12 April 1655
- Renamed: Royal Charles, 23 May 1660
- Captured: 12 June 1667, by the Dutch
- Fate: Sold for scrap, 1673 (by Dutch navy)
- Notes: Participated in: Battle of Lowestoft; Four Days Battle; St. James's Day Battle

General characteristics
- Class & type: 80-gun first-rate ship of the line
- Tons burthen: 112916/94 (bm) on completion, later increased to 125817/94 bm
- Length: 131 ft (39.9 m) (keel)
- Beam: 42 ft 0 in (12.8 m) on completion, later increased to 42 ft 6 in (13.0 m)
- Depth of hold: 18 ft (5.5 m)
- Sail plan: Full-rigged ship
- Complement: 500 - later raised to 550 then 650
- Armament: 80 guns of various weights of shot

Naseby was a three-decker ship of the line built for the Commonwealth of England's Navy. She was one of four Second rates authorised by the Council of State on 3 July 1654 as part of the 1654 Construction Programme, intended to carry 60 guns each. Construction was allocated to Woolwich Dockyard, where the ship was to be designed and built by Peter Pett II. She was named Naseby, in honour of Sir Thomas Fairfax's decisive 1645 victory over the Royalist forces during the English Civil Wars.

However, it was decided early on to alter the Programme to include a First rate "suitable as a fleet flagship", and Naseby was altered during construction to mount a complete battery of guns along the upper deck (compared with the partial battery on this deck of her intended sisters, on which there were no gunports in the waist along this deck), and so was reclassed as a First rate of 80 guns. Her length was extended by 7 ft (compared with her intended sisters), allowing room for a 14th pair of gunports on the lower deck, and also 14 pairs on the middle deck, as well as 13 pairs on the now fully-armed upper deck and 6 pairs on the quarterdeck.

On completion, she measured 131 ft on the keel and 42 ft in breadth (giving her a burthen tonnage of 1,12916/94), but the breadth was then increased by 6in to 42 ft 6 in by girdling (adding more timbers along the sides) which increased her burthen tonnage to 1,25817/94. She was armed with 20 cannon-of-seven (42-pounders) and 6 demi-cannon on the lower deck (compared with the all-demi-cannon main battery of her intended sisters), with 26 culverins on the middle deck and 28 demi-culverins on the higher decks; a further pair of demi-culverins was later added to bring her to 82 guns.

In the run-up to the Restoration of the monarchy in May (June, New Style) of 1660, she was anchored in The Downs off Deal, where her laurel-crowned figurehead of Oliver Cromwell (showing the Protector bestriding representatives of six nations) was removed before sailing to the Dutch Republic at the head of the fleet sent to bring King Charles II back to England, captained by Sir Edward Montagu and still under her Parliamentary name. On arrival in Scheveningen she took Charles and his entourage (including Samuel Pepys) on board. On 23 May 1660 the King and his brother James, Duke of York (Note: The Duke of York, later Lord High Admiral and later still James II of England. Pepys has King Charles dining with both James and his youngest brother Henry Stuart, Duke of Gloucester) renamed her from Naseby to HMS Royal Charles. The ship landed them at Dover on 25 May.

Under her new name, she joined the Royal Navy, which formally came into being in 1660. At 1,25817/94 tons, Naseby was larger than the Sovereign of the Seas built by Phineas Pett, Peter's father. Unlike the Sovereign of the Seas, which was in service from 1637 to 1697, Naseby/Royal Charles was to enjoy only twelve years in service.

As Royal Charles she took part in the Second Anglo-Dutch War. In 1665, she fought in the Battle of Lowestoft under the command of the Lord High Admiral, James Stuart, Duke of York, her captain being Sir William Penn. During that battle she probably destroyed the Dutch flagship Eendracht. In 1666, she participated in two further actions, the Four Days Battle and the defeat of Admiral Michiel de Ruyter in the St. James's Day Battle off the North Foreland.

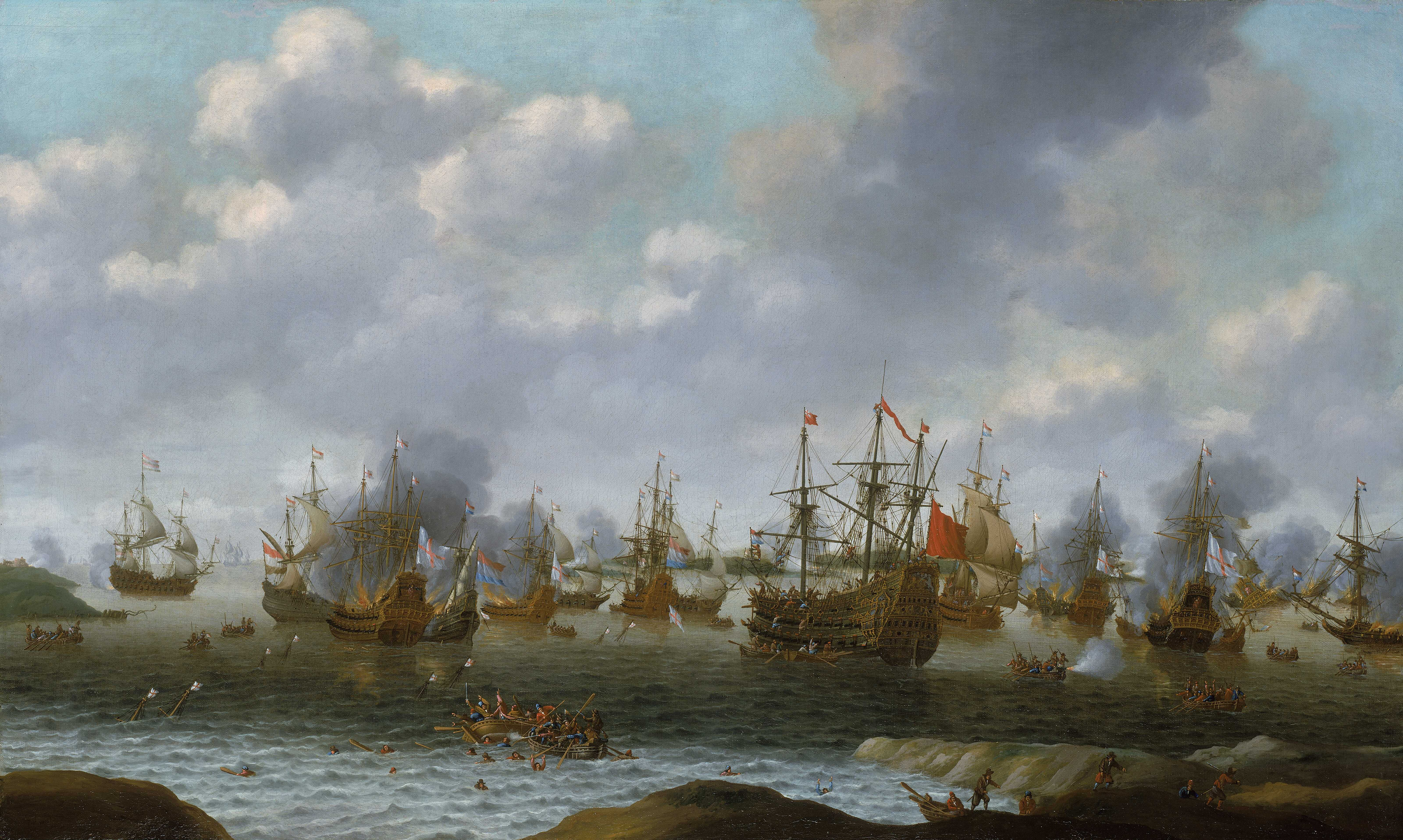
The painting Dutch attack on the Medway, June 1667 by Pieter Cornelisz van Soest, painted c. 1667 shows the captured Royal Charles, right of centre

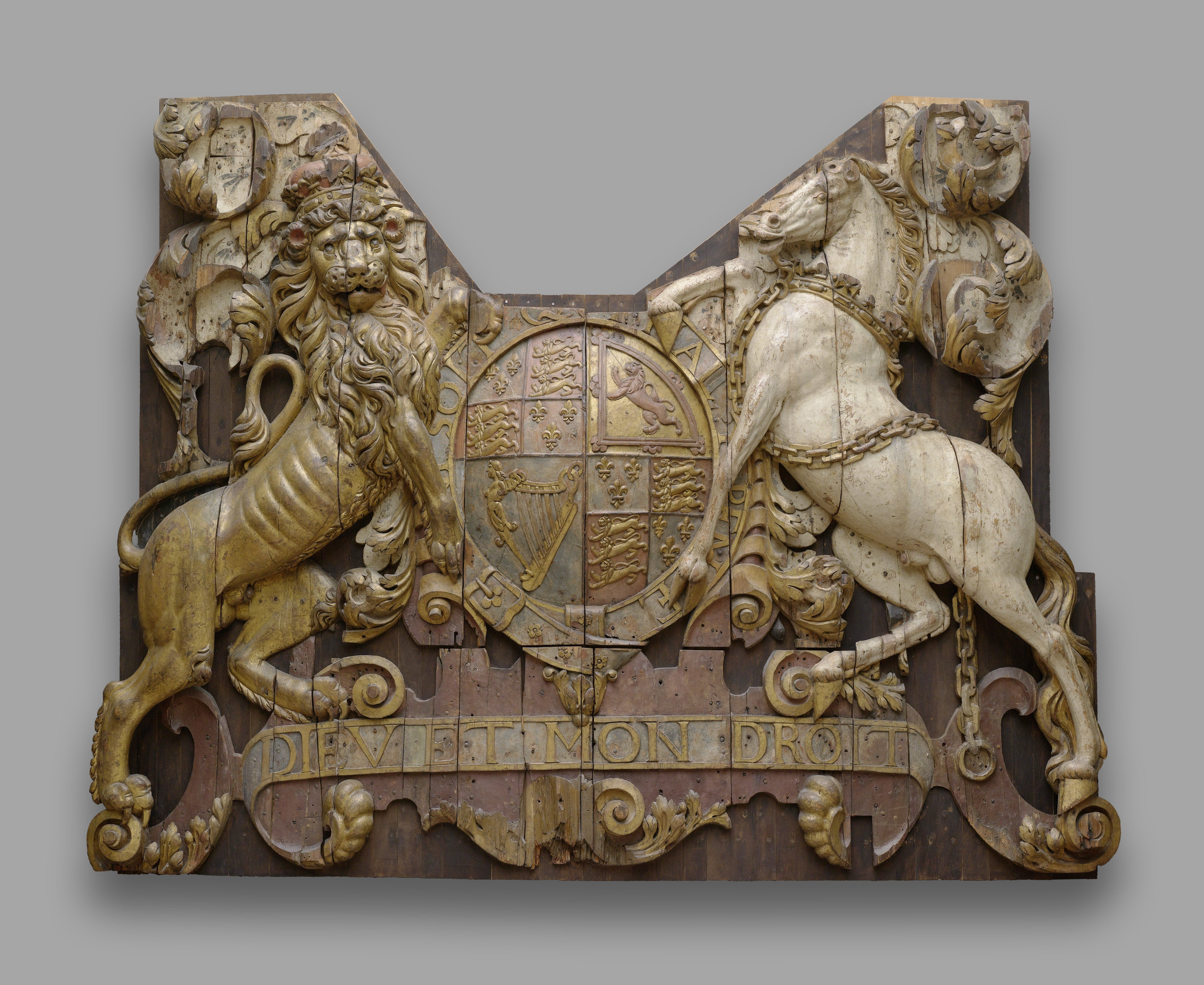
The stern piece preserved at Amsterdam

In 1667, flagging English national morale was further depressed by the Raid on the Medway in which a Dutch fleet invaded the Thames and Medway rivers and on 12 June captured the uncommissioned Royal Charles, removing her with great skill to Hellevoetsluis in the United Provinces. The Dutch did not take her into naval service because it was considered that she drew too much water for general use on the Dutch coast. Instead Royal Charles was permanently drydocked near Hellevoetsluis as a public attraction, with day trips being organised for large parties, often of foreign state guests. After vehement protests by Charles that this insulted his honour, the official visits were ended when she was auctioned for scrap in 1673.

The wooden carving showing the royal arms, originally placed on the ship's transom, was, however, preserved. After remaining at Hellevoetsluis for a while, it was brought to a naval shipbuilding yard in Rotterdam in the nineteenth century, and in 1855 was transferred to the Dutch navy's model collection. It is now on display in the Rijksmuseum in Amsterdam, which took most of the naval collection in the 1880s.
