= Jan Karel Donatus van Beecq =

Dutch painter

Jan Karel Donatus van Beecq (1638 – April 1722) was a Dutch marine painter, active in England and later in France, where he became a member of the Academy in 1681.

== Nomenclature ==
Although known to art historians by a conjectural Dutch version of his name, all contemporary documentary references use the French forms Jean-Charles-Dominique or Jean-Charles-Donat (with or without hyphens). The Académie's documents spell his surname "Vambec" or "Vambecq", but he signed his work "J. Van Beecq", "JVBeecq", or "I. Van Beec".

== Life ==
According to the record of his death in the minutes of the French Académie, van Beecq was born in Amsterdam in 1638. His earliest dated work, a capriccio view of Antwerp was painted in 1673. His paintings usually depict warships and battles out at sea, or scenes of harbours with palatial classical buildings standing directly on the waterfront.

=== England ===
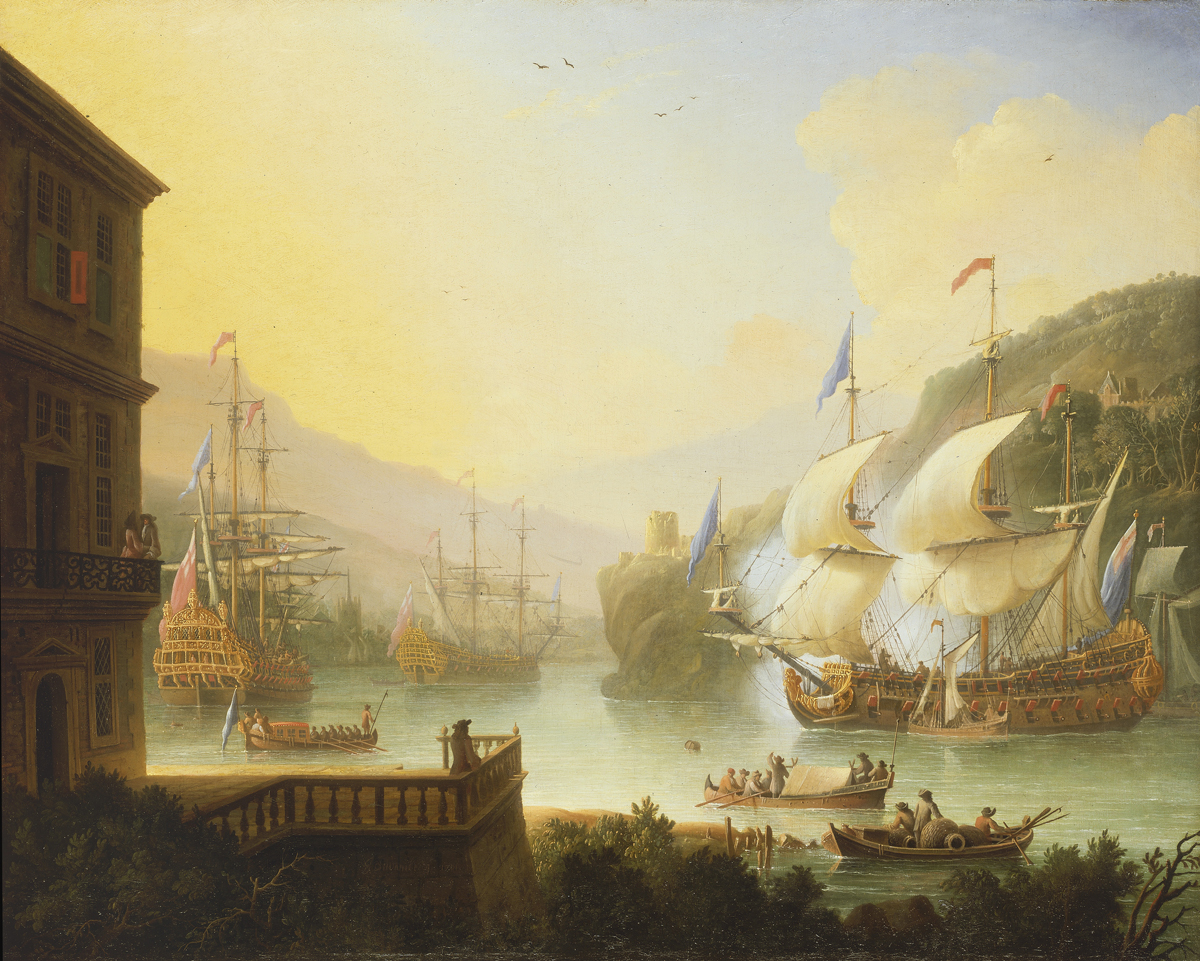
Shipping in an Estuary

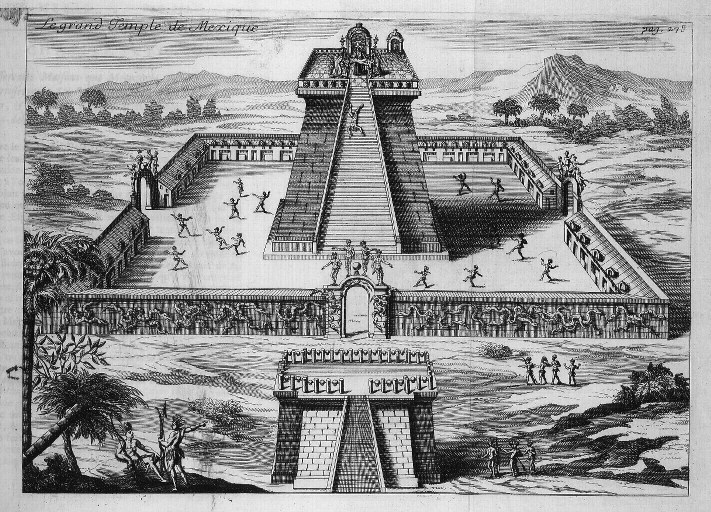
Temple of the Sun in Tenochtitlan, engraving by Moyse Jean-Baptiste Fouard after a drawing by Van Beecq.

Most of his pictures of 1677–9 are of English subjects, and the art historian Gary Schwartz has proposed that should be identified with the "Vanbeck" recorded as being admitted to the Painter-Stainers Company in the City of London in 1677. The following year, the same Vanbeck is recorded as living with a younger painter, Adriaen van Diest in Durham Yard, leading Schwartz to suggest that, in view of his style, he may have been a pupil of van Diest's grandfather, Willem, and had his origins, like van Diest, in The Hague.

The National Maritime Museum at Greenwich has two paintings by him showing English warships: The Royal Prince before the Wind, (1679) and Shipping in an Estuary (1701). The latter, an idealised sunlit scene, painted after his move to France, is his last signed and dated work.

=== France ===
Van Beecq was in Paris by July 1680, when he presented a painting at a meeting of the Académie royale de Peinture et de Sculpture, of which he became a member on 26 April 1681. He benefited from the support of Charles Lebrun, the Académie's patron and founder, who persuaded it, contrary to its usual practice, to pay the artist the full amount of his entry emolument at once, for "important reasons" which are not recorded.

By 1685, there were four paintings by van Beecq in place at Louis XIV's new palace at Marly, the decoration of which was organised by Le Brun and Jules Hardouin Mansart. They are known to have included views of Algiers Bombarded by Night and The Cannonade of Chios. The latter, the only surviving painting by van Beecq of which a contemporary documentary record exists, is now in the collection of Musée de la Marine in Paris. The king also owned van Beecq's painting of the bombardment of Genoa by Admiral Dusquesne in 1684; two versions were painted, though neither is known today. Surviving correspondence shows that drawings by eyewitnesses of the bombardment were gathered by government officials as source material to supply to van Beecq, to ensure the accuracy of his representation. A large engraving on two plates was made after the painting by Moyse Jean-Baptiste Fouard.

In 1691, Fouard engraved a series of plates after van Beecq's designs (only one of which is signed by the two men) for the French translation of a history of the Spanish invasion of Mexico, called Histoire de la conquête du Mexique ou de la Novelle Espagne.

He was expelled from the Académie in 1694, depriving him of the prestigious title of peintre du roi, but readmitted three years later. He did not attend any meetings after 1701, and the minutes of the Académie record his death in April 1722, aged 83.
