= English ship Leopard (1635) =

History

England
- Name: Leopard
- Ordered: 1 March 1634
- Builder: Peter Pett I, Woolwich
- Launched: 11 March 1635
- Commissioned: 1635
- Captured: 4 March 1653, by the Dutch

Dutch Republic
- Name: Luipaard
- Acquired: 4 March 1653

General characteristics
- Class & type: 34-gun third-rate ship of the line
- Tons burthen: 516 (550.3 by later calculation)
- Length: 95 ft (29 m) (keel)
- Beam: 33 ft (10 m)
- Depth of hold: 12 ft 4 in (3.76 m)
- Sail plan: Full-rigged ship
- Armament: 36 guns of various weights of shot

Leopard was a 34-gun third-rate ship of the line of the English Navy, built by Peter Pett I at Woolwich and launched in 1635.

During the First Anglo-Dutch War, Leopard was captured by the Eendracht of the Dutch Republic at the Battle of Leghorn on 3 March 1653, with the loss of 70 men killed and 54 wounded. In Dutch service she was renamed Luipaard.
