= Jeronymus van Diest =

Dutch painter

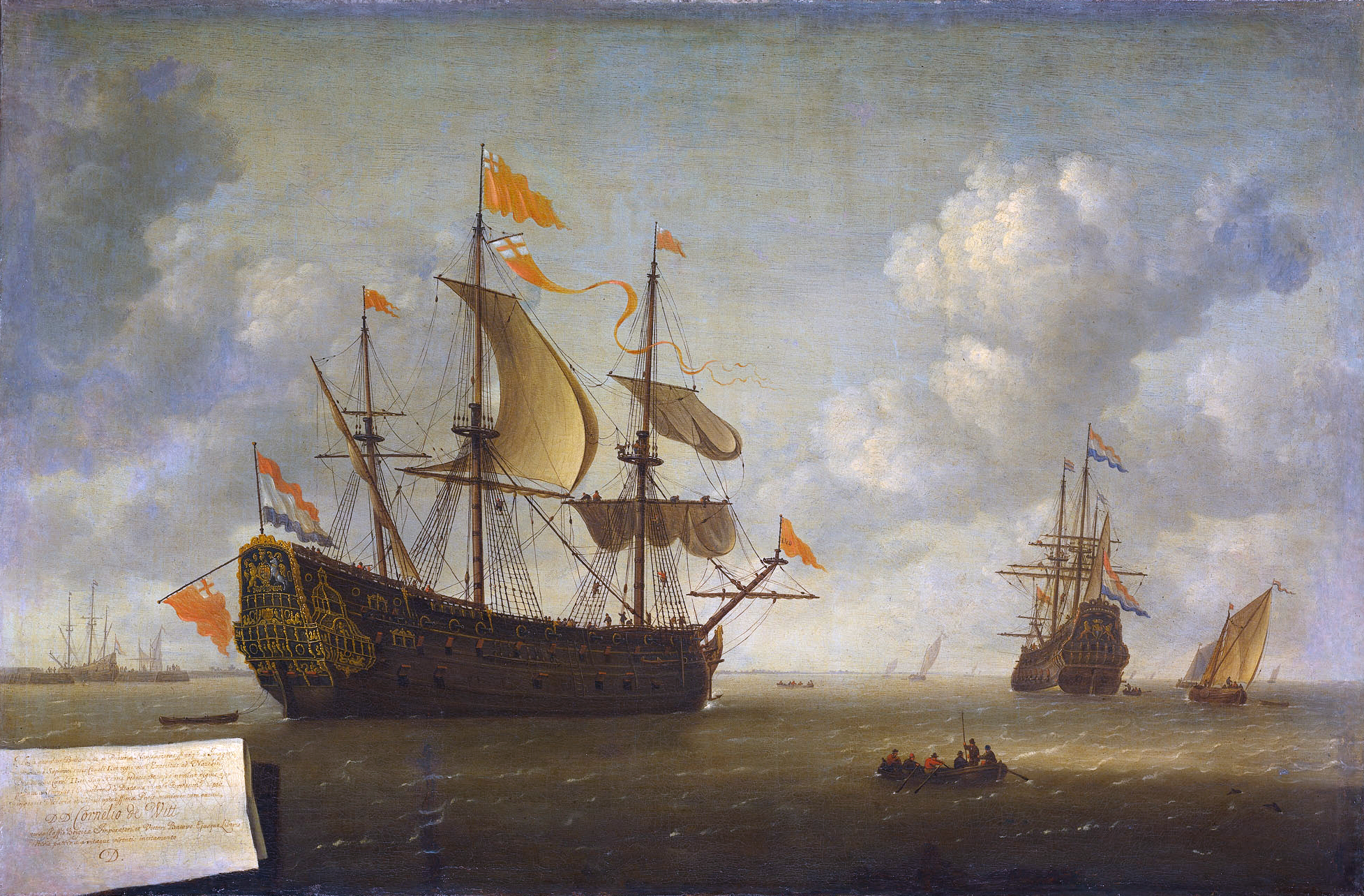
Royal Charles off Chatham, captured by the Dutch after the Raid on the Medway, June 1667.

Hieronymus, or Jeronymus van Diest (1631 in The Hague – c. 1687 in The Hague), was a Dutch Golden Age seascape painter.

According to Houbraken, a Jeronymus van Diest was good with grisailles and was the teacher of Adriaen van de Venne. This grisaille painter Jeronymus Diest (I) may possibly have been a grandfather of the younger Jeronymus Diest (II); since they are both from the Hague.

According to the RKD this younger Jeronymus Diest (II) was the son of the painter Willem van Diest and the father of the painter Adriaen van Diest who was a follower of Jan van Goyen and Hendrik Dubbels. His known works are all seascapes with various ships at sail.
