= Henry Appleton (Royal Navy officer) =

Henry Appleton (fl. 1650–1654) was an English captain in the navy and commodore.

== Biography ==
He was a townsman and presumably a native of Hull; but his name does not appear in any list of naval officers during the civil war or until 26 September 1650, when an order was sent by the parliament to the council of state to appoint him 'as commander of the ship now to be built at Woolwich, or any other ship that they think fit.' This is the earliest mention of him as yet known. That his appointment was irregular and gave offence to his subordinates, officers of some experience at sea, and that he had neither the knowledge nor the ability to enforce obedience to his orders, appears throughout his whole correspondence, which gives an account of his sailing in the Leopard of 50 guns, of his arrival at Smyrna with the convoy, of his sailing thence in April 1651, and of his successive arrivals at Zante, Messina, Naples, and Genoa. In November 1651 he went to Leghorn, and immediately off that port captured, or permitted the ships with him to capture, a French vessel; thus, at the outset, giving offence to the Grand Duke of Tuscany. After staying a month at Leghorn he left for Naples, and with the Levant trade sailed again to Smyrna, returning to Leghorn in the end of June 1652.

The war with the Dutch Republic had just broken out, and a squadron of fourteen Dutch ships of war rendered it impossible for the English to move out. The force that Appleton had with him was not more than half that of the Dutch, and during the rest of the summer he attempted nothing beyond despatching the Constant Warwick to reinforce Commodore Richard Badiley, who was expected shortly on the coast of Italy. On 27 August 1652,. the Dutch learned that Badiley was off the island of Elba; and slipping out with their squadron, now of ten ships, they brought him to action, when, after a fight which lasted through that day and into the next, they succeeded in capturing the Phoenix. Appleton made no attempt to help Badiley, pleading afterwards 'that the Lord had at that time visited him with a violent sickness;’ to which Badiley answered that no one else knew of it, and that even if he was sick he ought still to have sent his ships.

Badiley, after his defeat, retreated to Porto Longone, where he was blockaded by part of the Dutch squadron, the other part watching Appleton at Leghorn and refitting the Phoenix. On 2 November Badiley came overland to communicate with Appleton, having received instructions from home to take the entire command. It seems to have been then arranged between them that, in defiance of the neutrality of the port, an attempt should be made to retake the Phoenix, which was successfully carried into execution by Captain Cox on the evening of 20 November, or, according to New Style, 30 November, when the Dutch were holding drunken revelry in honour of St. Andrew. The grand duke was further incensed by Appleton's seizure next day of a Dutch prisoner who had escaped and put himself under the protection of a Tuscan sentry. The duke sent for Appleton, made him a close prisoner under circumstances of much indignity, and two days later sent him, still a prisoner, to Commodore Badiley at Porto Longone, who, holding a council of war, superseded him from the command of the Leopard; all which was approved of by the government at home, and orders were sent out for Appleton to return to England overland. It was, however, decided by Badiley to leave Appleton in command of the Leopard whilst the two squadrons combined to force their way past the Dutch, who had prevailed on the grand duke to give the English a peremptory order to restore the Phoenix or to quit the port.

Appleton was accordingly sent back to his ship at Leghorn, and on 1 March 1653 Badiley wrote to him to be ready to come out to meet him as soon as he should appear off the port. Badiley's idea was that the Dutch would attack whichever squadron happened to be to leeward of them, and that the windward squadron might support it. They did not do so; but the wind being offshore, as soon as Appleton was well clear of the port on 4 March they fell on him, and before Badiley, who was a considerable distance to leeward, could come at all near, had completely crushed him. Of the six ships which formed his squadron one only escaped. The Leopard defended herself stoutly, till at last the ship's company refused to fight any longer, and would not permit the poop, which the enemy had won, to be blown up; they seized and disarmed Appleton, and called for quarter. He was held prisoner for some months, but being released on a security of 5,000 pieces of eight, he returned to England, complaining bitterly of having been deserted and betrayed. Inquiry showed that these complaints were unfounded, and that his defeat by the Dutch was due, not to any shyness on the part of Badiley, but to his own ill-judged haste in leaving the port before Badiley was engaged with the Dutch. Appleton was never employed again, and vanished from the historical record.
