= Willem van Diest =

Dutch Golden Age seascape painter

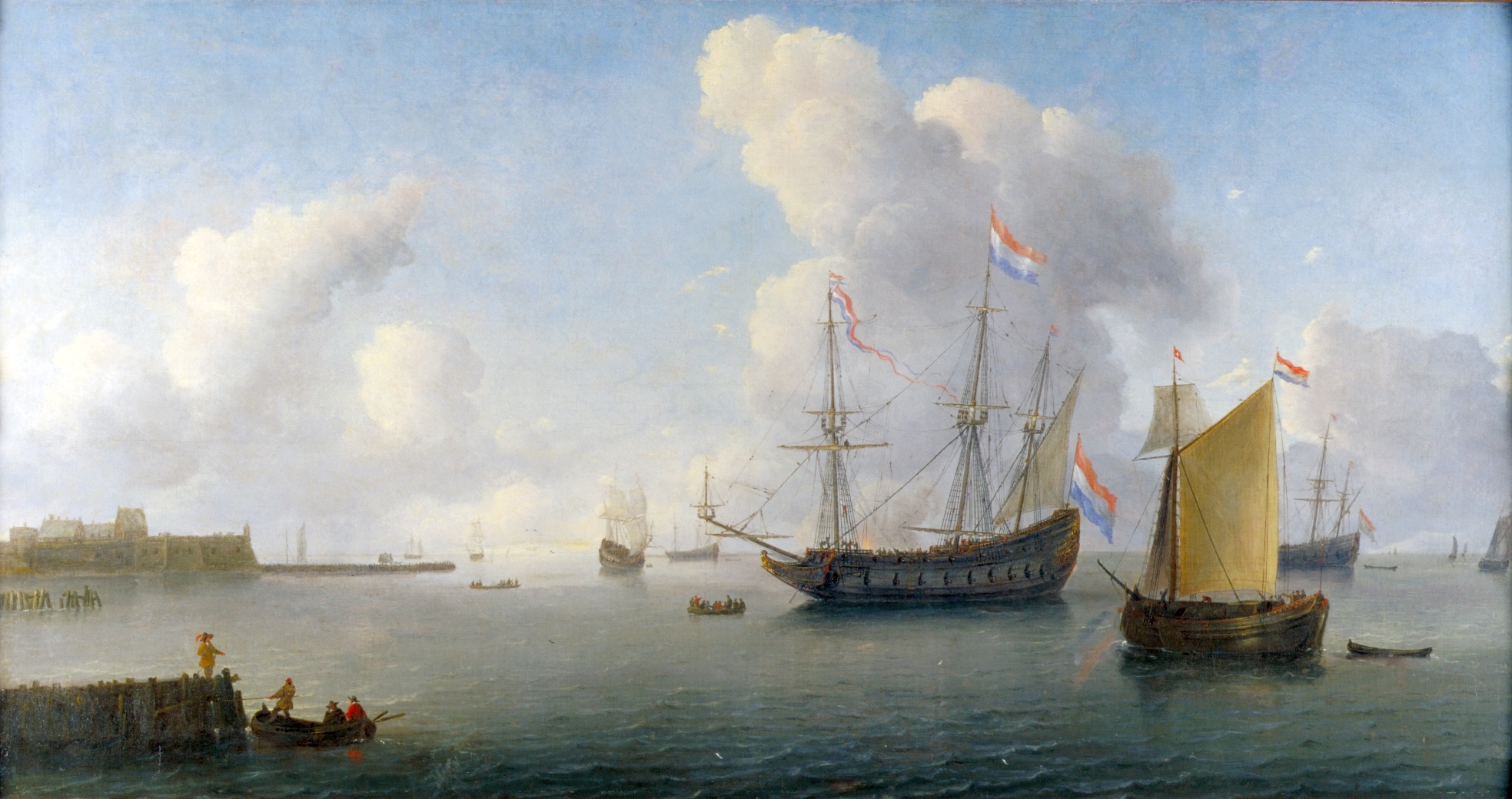
View of Fort Rammekens near Vlissingen, 1657

Willem Hermansz. van Diest (c. 1600 in The Hague – c. 1678 in The Hague), was a Dutch Golden Age seascape painter.

He was the father of the painter Jeronymus van Diest and a follower of Jan van Goyen, Jan Porcellis and Simon de Vlieger. In 1656 he helped set up the Confrerie Pictura.

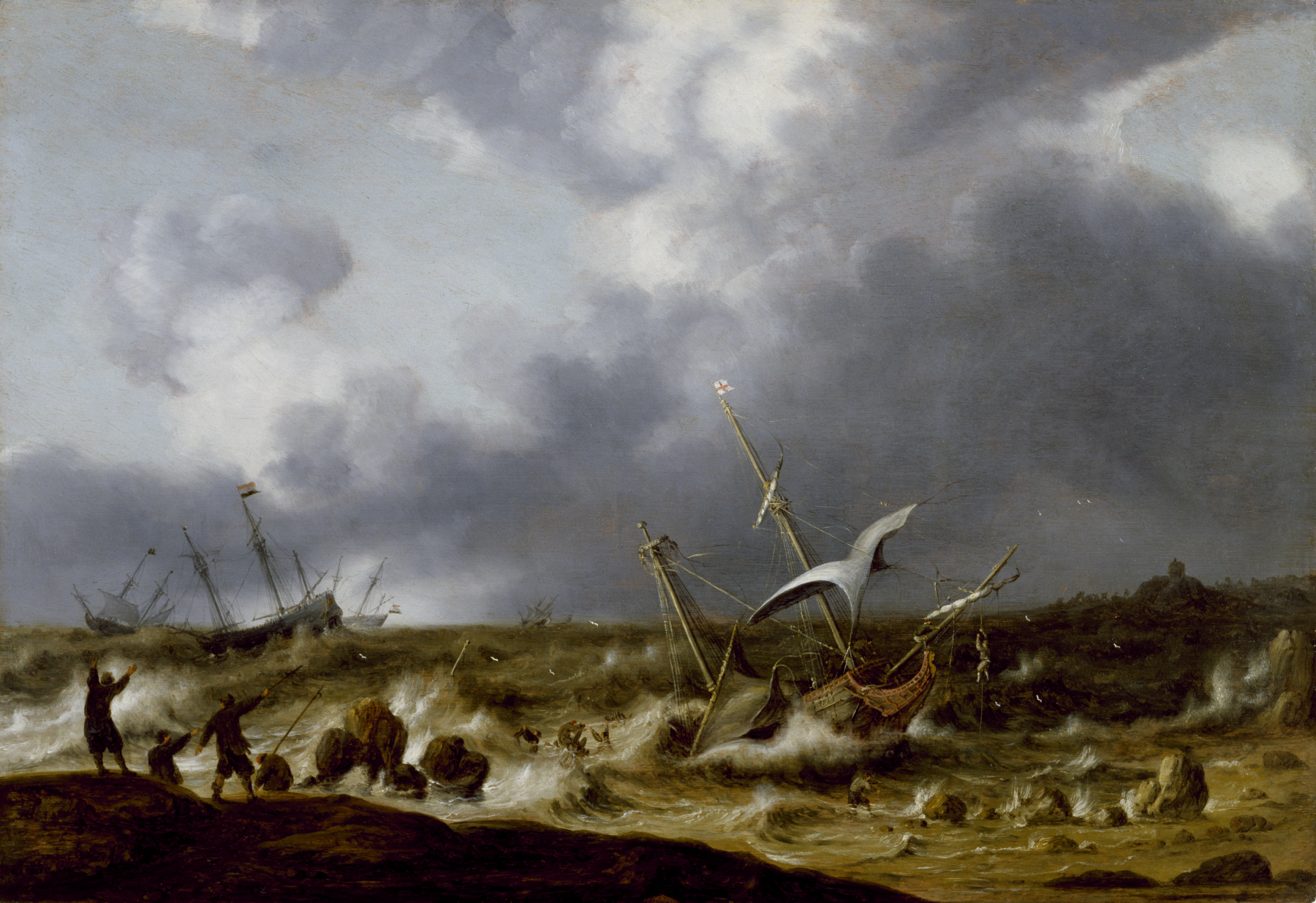
Shipwreck in a Storm (1629). The Walters Art Museum.
