= Samson Threatening His Father-In-Law =

1635 painting by Rembrandt van Rijn

Samson threatens his father-in-law
- Samson threatening his father-in-law
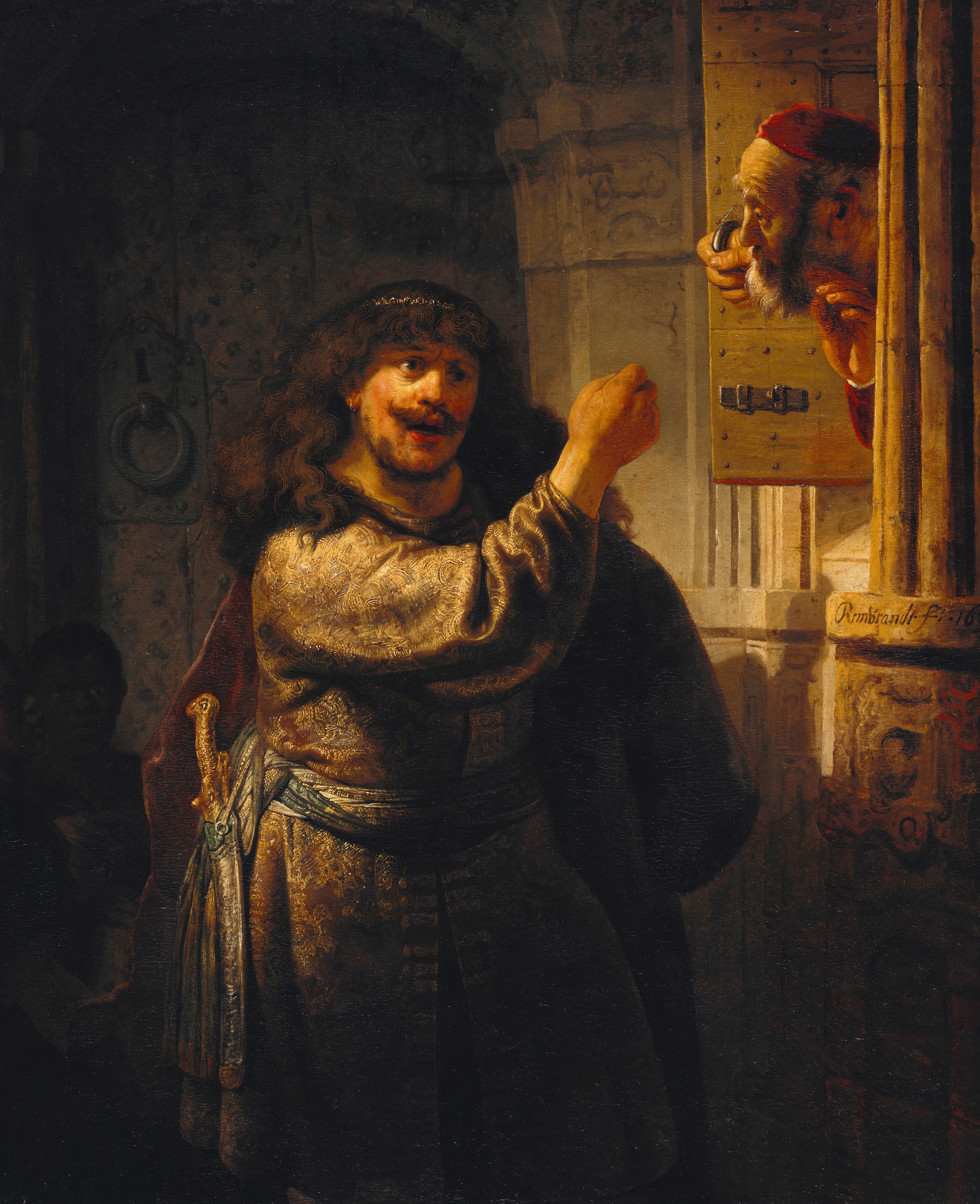
- Artist: Rembrandt
- Year: 1635
- Medium: oil paint, canvas
- Dimensions: 158.5 cm (62.4 in) × 130.5, 131 cm (51.4, 51.6 in)
- Location: Sanssouci Picture Gallery

Samson Threatening His Father-In-Law is a 1635 oil-on-canvas painting by Rembrandt, now in the Gemäldegalerie, Berlin. It depicts the Biblical story of Samson, who has returned home after an absence to find that his father-in-law has given away Samson's Philistine wife to another man. Samson's reaction was to set fire to the crops in the Philistines' fields.

The painting's narrative subject is "virtually without precedent in Dutch art" according to art historian Gary Schwartz, who says that the painting may have been commissioned by Frederick William, Elector of Brandenburg, and that the bellicose subject may allude to a contemporary event: the fighting in Kleve between Spain and the Dutch Republic during the Eighty Years' War.

== See also ==
- List of paintings by Rembrandt
