= Eighty Years' War, 1621–1648 =

Final phase of the Eighty Years' War

The Low Countries in 1621–1628 Dutch Republic Dutch conquests Spanish Netherlands Spanish conquests Prince-Bishopric of Liège

The years 1621–1648 constituted the final phase of the Eighty Years' War (c. 1568–1648) between the Spanish Empire and the emerging Dutch Republic. It began when the Twelve Years' Truce (1609–1621) expired, and concluded with the Peace of Münster in 1648.

Although the Dutch and Spanish were both involved in opposite sides of the War of the Jülich Succession (June 1609 – October 1610; May–October 1614) in Jülich-Cleves-Berg, they carefully avoided each other, and thus the hostilities never spread back into the Habsburg Netherlands, and the truce held firm. Nevertheless, attempts to negotiate a definitive peace also failed, and the war resumed as anticipated in 1621. Essentially, it became a side theatre of the wider Thirty Years' War that had already broken out with the Bohemian Revolt in 1618 in eastern parts of the Holy Roman Empire (Bohemia and Austria), pitting Central Europe's Protestant Union against the Catholic League, although the two conflicts never fully merged. With several back and forths – notably, the Spanish conquered Breda in 1625, but the Dutch took it back in 1637 – the Dutch Republic was able to conquer the eastern border forts of Oldenzaal (1626) and Groenlo (1627), the major Brabantian city of 's-Hertogenbosch (1629), the fortified cities of Venlo, Roermond and Maastricht along the Meuse (1632), and Sas van Gent (1644) and Hulst (1645) in Zeelandic Flanders.

Nevertheless, peace talks in 1629–1630 came to nothing. More ambitious plans to conquer Brussels in 1632–1633 with the help of anti-Spanish nobility in the Southern Netherlands never came to fruition. Several attempted Northern republican surprises and sieges of Antwerp were parried by the Spanish Army of Flanders.

Nor did the Franco-Dutch alliance bring significant changes to the situation on the ground. It began with a disastrous Franco-Dutch invasion of the southern Netherlands in 1635. This in fact made matters worse for the Dutch when French and Dutch troops sacked the city of Tienen, which cost them the sympathies of the southern Netherlands population.

However, French intervention and internal discontent at the costs of the war in the Low Countries led to a change in Spain's 'Netherlands First' policy. Instead Spain focused on suppressing the French-backed Reapers' War in Catalonia. The resulting stalemate and financial troubles, plus Spanish military exhaustion and Dutch desire for formal political recognition, eventually convinced both sides in the mid-1640s to hold peace talks.

The outcome was the 1648 Peace of Münster, which confirmed most agreements already reached with the Truce of 1609.

== Background ==
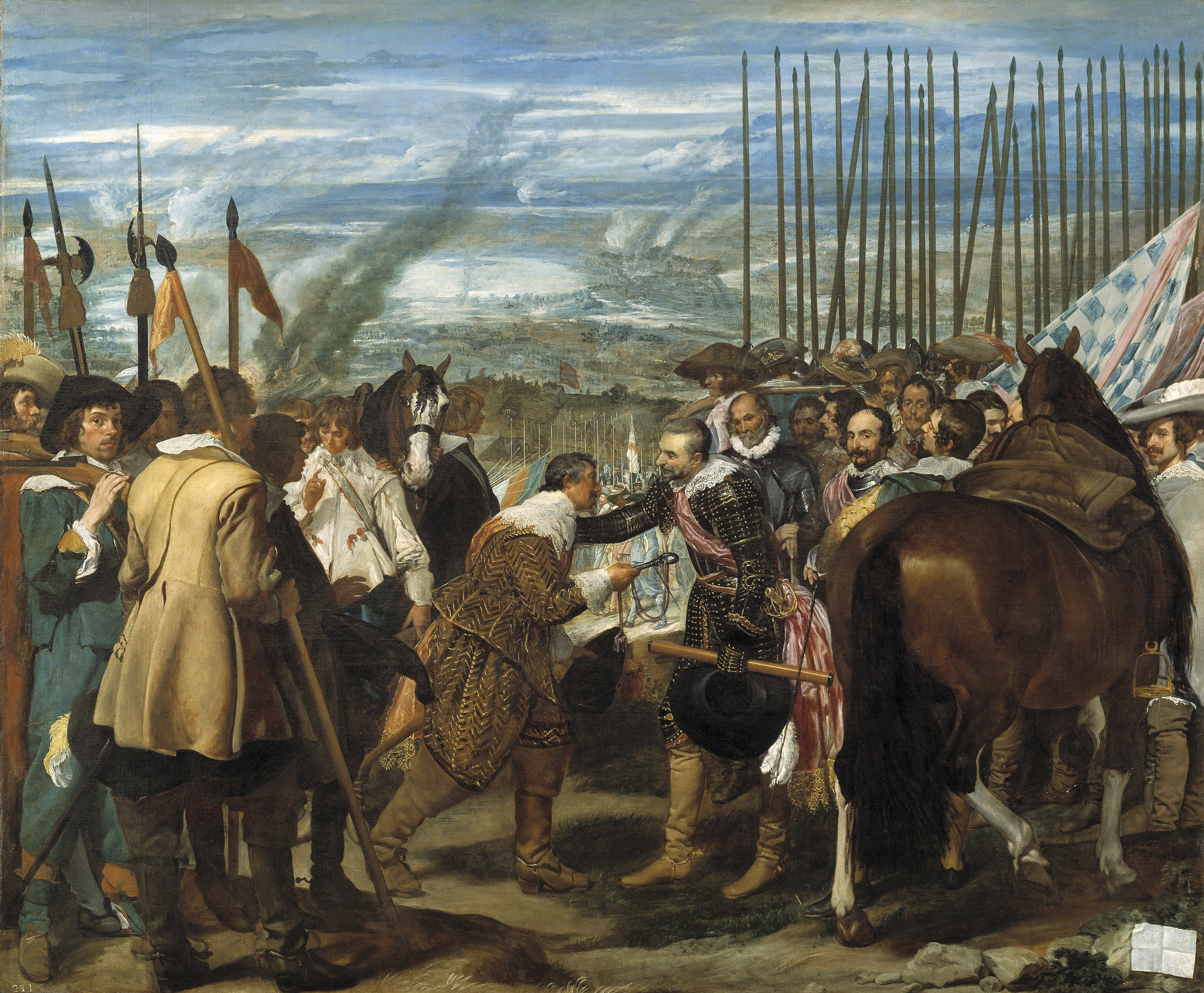
1625: The Surrender of Breda, by Diego Velázquez, depicting the Dutch commanders yielding to Spanish commander Ambrogio Spinola

Van Oldenbarnevelt had no ambition to have the Republic become the leading power of Protestant Europe, and he had shown restraint when, in 1609–1610 and 1614, the Republic had felt constrained to intervene militarily in the Jülich-Cleves crisis opposite Spain. Though there had been a danger of armed conflict between the Spanish and Dutch forces involved in the crisis, both sides took care to avoid each other, respecting each other's spheres of influence.

Negotiations for a permanent peace went on throughout the truce. Two major issues could not be resolved. First, the Spanish demand for religious freedom of Catholics in the Dutch Republic was countered by a Dutch demand for a similar religious freedom for Protestants in the Southern Netherlands. Second, there was a growing disagreement over the trade routes to the different colonies (in the Far East and the Americas). The Dutch used their navy to enlarge their colonial trade routes to the detriment of Spain (primarily concentrating on capturing Philip's Portuguese possessions, since Portugal had not signed the truce). On behalf of the Austrian archdukes, Brabantian diplomat Petrus Peckius the Younger made one last attempt at negotiating a renewal of the truce in March 1621 in The Hague. He addressed the States-General on 23 March 1621, proposing that the Dutch Republic would be left to run its own affairs in return for a nominal recognition of the sovereignty of the king of Spain. This suggestion was not well received by his hosts and he was sent back with an indignant rejection of his proposal. The war was on once more – and crucially, at risk of fully merging with the wider Thirty Years' War that had already broken out in 1618.

== Dutch intervention in the early stages of the Thirty Years' War (1619–1621) ==
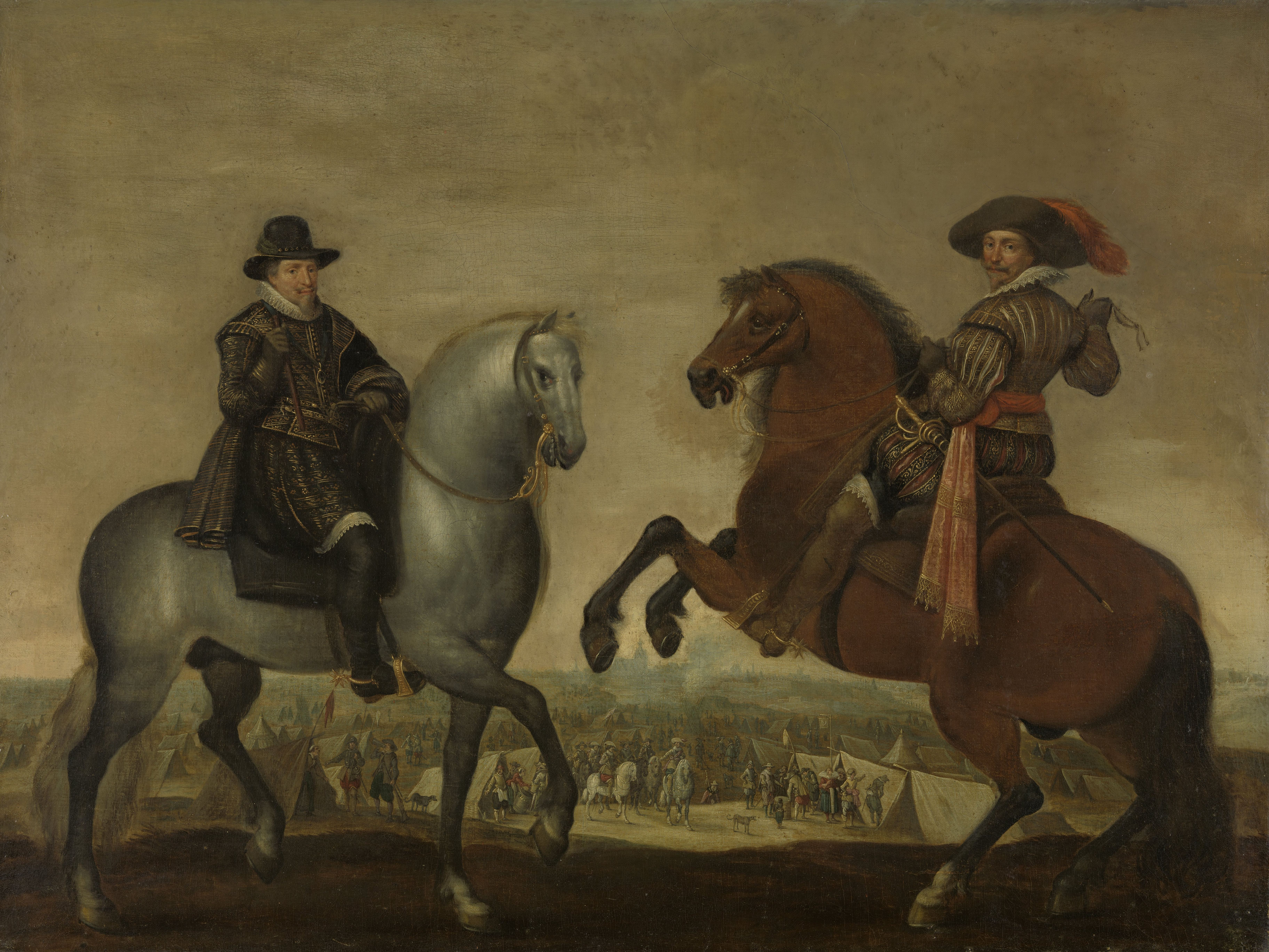
Maurice and Frederick Henry of Orange on horseback.

While the Twelve Years' Truce was still underway, civil war had begun in the Kingdom of Bohemia following the Second defenestration of Prague on 23 May 1618. The Bohemian insurgents were now pitted against their king, Ferdinand, who would soon succeed his uncle Matthias (the former States General governor-general of the Netherlands) as Holy Roman Emperor. They cast about for support in this struggle, and on the Protestant side only the Republic was able and willing to provide it. This took the form of support for Frederick V, Elector Palatine, a nephew of Prince Maurice and a son-in-law of James I, when Frederick accepted the crown of Bohemia the insurgents offered him (he was crowned on 4 November 1619). His father-in-law had sought to restrain him from doing this, warning that he could not count on English aid, but Maurice encouraged him in every way, providing a large subsidy and promising Dutch armed assistance. The Dutch therefore played a large role in precipitating the Thirty Years' War.

Maurice's motivation was the desire to manoeuvre the Republic into a better position should the war with Spain resume after the expiration of the truce in 1621. Renewal of the truce was a distinct possibility, but it had become less likely, as both in Spain and in the Republic more hard-line factions had come to power. Though civil war had been avoided in the Republic, national unity had been bought with much bitterness on the losing Remonstrant side, and Maurice for the moment had to garrison several former Remonstrant-dominated cities to guard against insurrection. This encouraged the Spanish government, perceiving internal weakness in the Republic, to choose a bolder policy in the Bohemian question than they otherwise might have done. The Bohemian war therefore soon degenerated into a proxy war between Spain and the Republic. Even after the Battle of White Mountain of November 1620, which ended disastrously for the Protestant army (one-eighth of which was in the Dutch pay), the Dutch continued to support Frederick militarily, both in Bohemia and in the Electoral Palatinate. Maurice also provided diplomatic support, pressing both the Protestant German princes and James I to come to Frederick's aid. When James sent 4,000 English troops in September 1620, these were armed and transported by the Dutch, and their advance covered by a Dutch cavalry column.

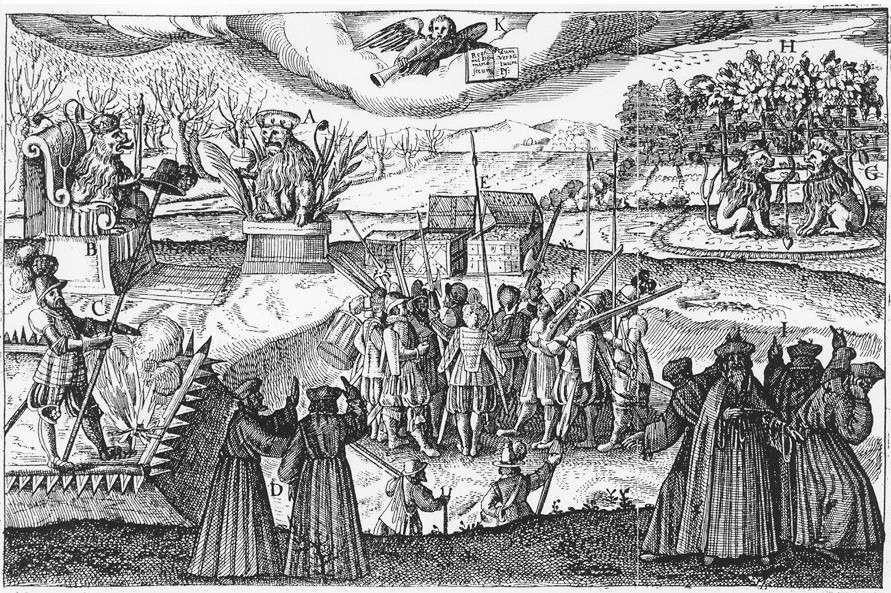
Detail from a pamphlet about the Winter King

In the end the Dutch intervention was in vain. After just a few months, Frederick and his wife Elizabeth fled into exile at The Hague, where they became known as the Winter King and Queen for their brief reign. Maurice pressed Frederick, in vain, to at least defend the Palatinate against the Spanish troops under Spinola and Tilly. This stage of the war witnessed the triumph of Spain and the Imperial forces in Germany. James held this against Maurice for his incitement of the losing side with promises that he could not keep.

There was continual contact between Maurice and the government in Brussels during 1620 and 1621 regarding a possible renewal of the truce. Archduke Albert of Austria, who had first become Governor General of the Habsburg Netherlands, then its sovereign (following his marriage to Isabella Clara Eugenia, the daughter of Philip II), was in favour of a renewal, especially after Maurice falsely gave him the impression that a peace would be possible on the basis of a token recognition by the Republic of the sovereignty of the king of Spain. When Albert sent the chancellor of Brabant, Petrus Peckius, to The Hague to negotiate with the States General on this basis, he fell into this trap and mentioned this recognition, instantly alienating his hosts. Nothing was as certain to unite the northern provinces as the suggestion that they should abandon their hard-fought sovereignty. If this incident had not come up, the negotiations might well have been successful as a number of the provinces were amenable to simply renewing the truce on its existing terms. Now formal negotiations were broken off, however, and Maurice was authorised to conduct further negotiations in secret. His attempts to get a better deal met with counter-demands from the new Spanish government for more substantive Dutch concessions. The Spaniards demanded Dutch evacuation of the West and East Indies; lifting of the restrictions on Antwerp's trade by way of the Scheldt; and toleration of the public practice of the Catholic religion in the Republic. These demands were unacceptable to Maurice and the truce expired in April 1621.

The war did not immediately resume, however. Maurice continued sending secret offers to Isabella after Albert had died in July 1621, through the intermediary of the Flemish painter and diplomat Peter Paul Rubens. Though the contents of these offers (which amounted to a version of the concessions demanded by Spain) were not known in the Republic, the fact of the secret negotiations became known. Proponents of restarting the war were disquieted, like the investors in the Dutch West India Company, which after a long delay was finally about to be founded, with a main objective of bringing the war to Spanish America. Opposition against the peace feelers therefore mounted, and nothing came of them.

== The Republic under siege (1621–1628) ==
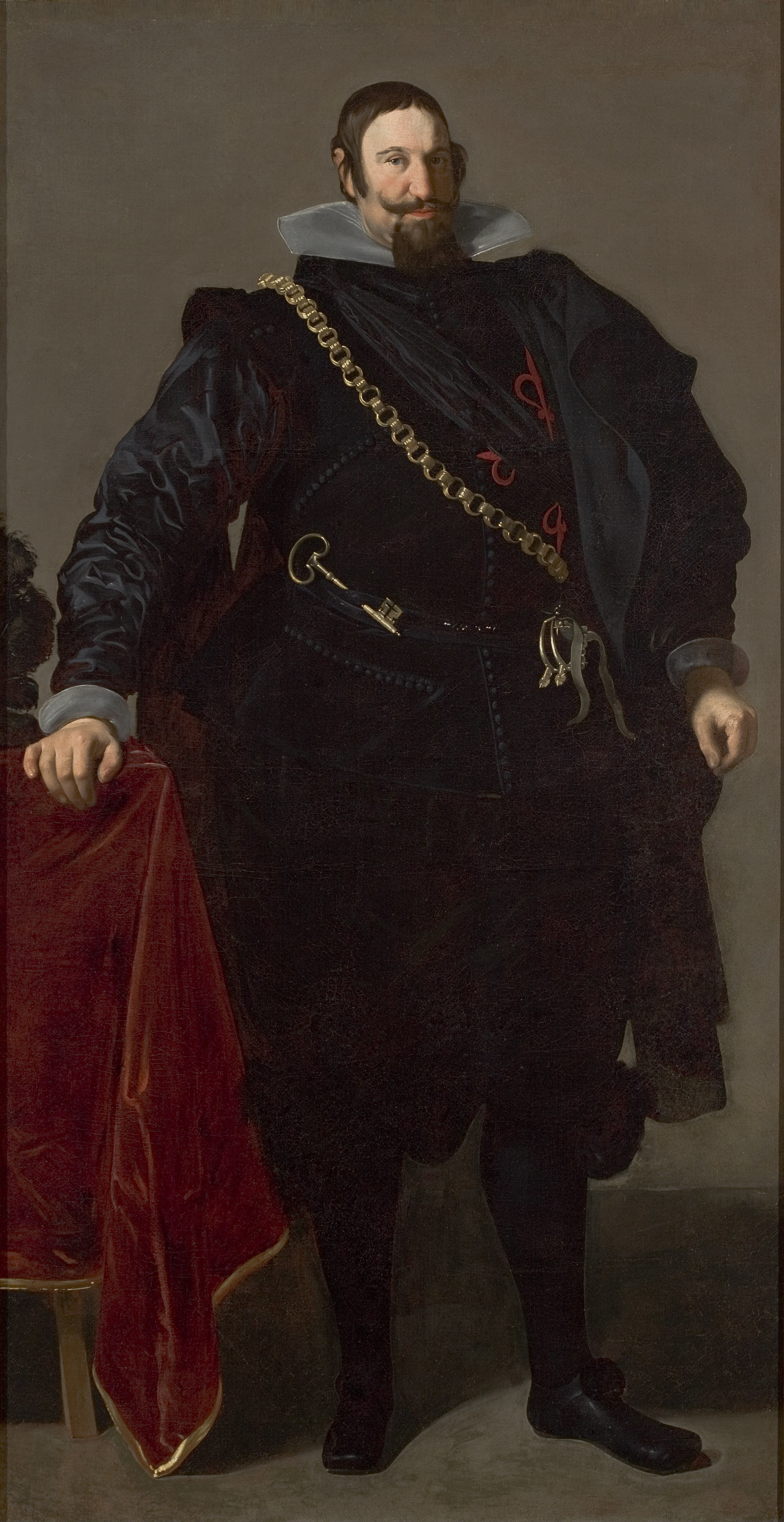
Portrait of the Gaspar de Guzmán, Count-Duke of Olivares

=== Spanish power transfer and Spinola's conquest of Breda (1621–1625) ===
The truce officially expired on 9 April 1621; Philip III had died shortly before, on 31 March. He was succeeded by his 16-year-old son Philip IV, and the new government under Gaspar de Guzmán, Count-Duke of Olivares had to get settled. Shortly after Albert of Austria also died on 13 July, so that Austrian Habsburg rule over the (Southern) Netherlands reverted to the Spanish branch. Isabella Clara Eugenia lost her sovereignty over the Netherlands upon her husband's death, and became governor-general for Philip IV instead.

The view in the Spanish government was that the truce had been economically ruinous. The Spanish considered that the truce had enabled the Dutch to gain very unequal advantages in the trade with the Iberian Peninsula and the Mediterranean, owing to their mercantile prowess. Meanwhile, the continued blockade of Antwerp had contributed to that city's steep decline in importance (hence the demand for the lifting of the closing of the Scheldt). The shift in the terms of trade between Spain and the Republic had resulted in a permanent trade deficit for Spain, which naturally translated into a drain of Spanish silver to the Republic. The truce had also given further impetus to the Dutch penetration of the East Indies, and in 1615 a naval expedition under Joris van Spilbergen had raided the west coast of Spanish South America. Spain felt threatened by these incursions and sought to stop them. Finally, the economic advantages had given the Republic the financial wherewithal to build a large navy during the truce and to enlarge its standing army to a size where it could rival the Spanish military might. This increased military power appeared to be directed principally to thwart Spain's policy objectives, as witnessed by the Dutch interventions in Germany in 1614 and 1619, as well as the Dutch alliances with the enemies of Spain in the Mediterranean, like Venice and the Sultanate of Morocco. The three conditions Spain had set for a continuation of the truce had been intended to remedy these disadvantages of the truce (the demand for freedom of worship for Catholics being made as a matter of principle, but also to mobilise the still sizeable Catholic minority in the Republic and so destabilise it politically).

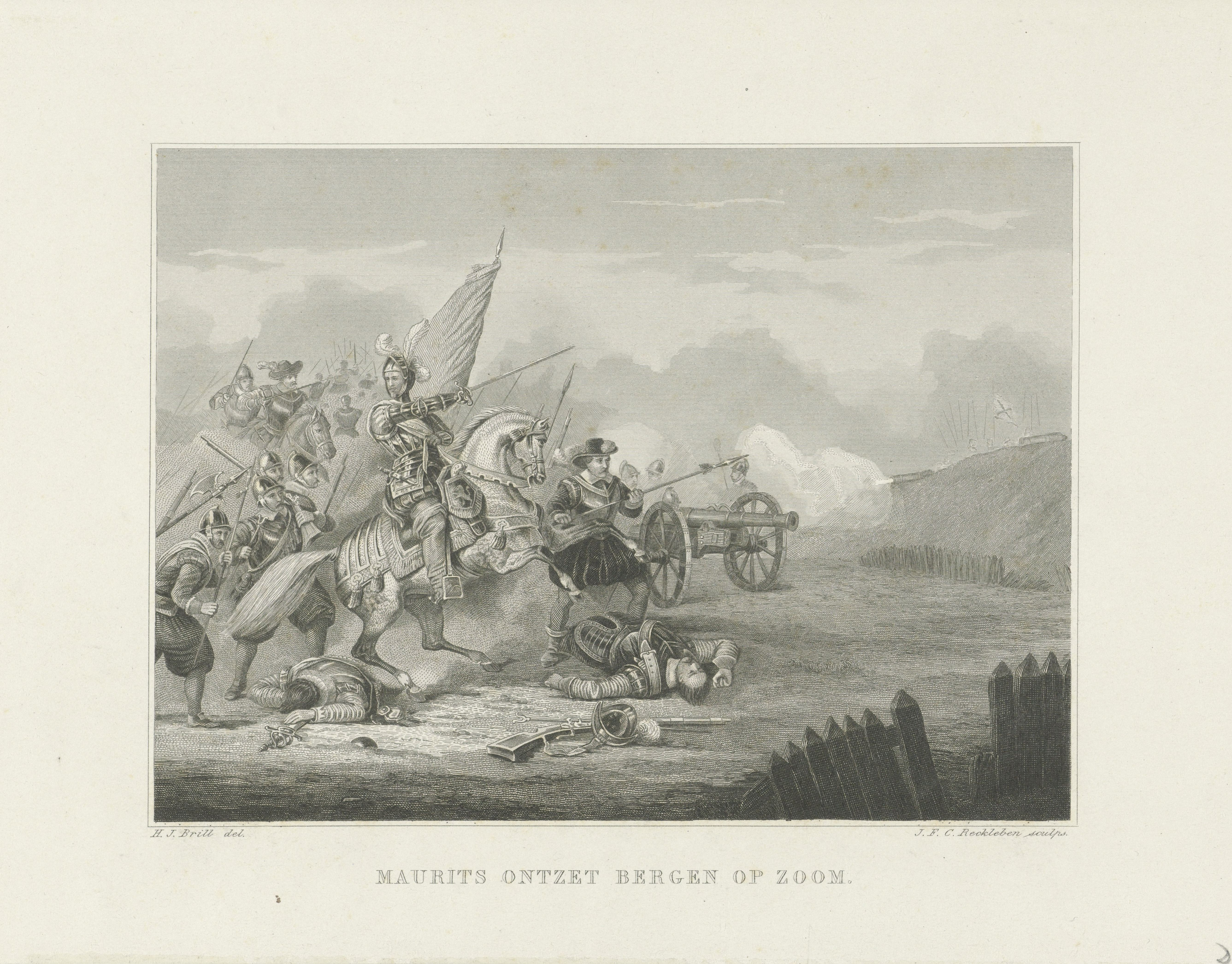
19th century depiction of the relief of Bergen op Zoom

Despite the unfortunate impression the opening speech of Chancellor Peckius had made at the negotiations about the renewal of the truce, the objective of Spain and the regime in Brussels was not a war of reconquest of the Republic. Instead the options considered in Madrid were either a limited exercise of the force of weapons, to capture a few of the strategic points the Republic had recently acquired (like Cleves), combined with measures of economic warfare, or reliance on economic warfare alone. Spain opted for the first alternative. Immediately after the expiration of the truce in April 1621, all Dutch ships were ordered out of Spanish ports and the stringent trade embargoes from before 1609 were renewed. After an interval to rebuild the strength of the Army of Flanders, Ambrogio Spinola opened a number of land offensives, during which he captured the fortress of Jülich (garrisoned by the Dutch since 1614) in 1622, and Steenbergen in Brabant, before laying siege to the important fortress city of Bergen-op-Zoom. This proved a costly fiasco as Spinola's besieging army of 18,000 melted away through disease and desertion. He therefore had to lift the siege after a few months. The strategic import of this humiliating experience was that the Spanish government now concluded that besieging the strong Dutch fortresses was a waste of time and money and decided to henceforth concentrate on economic warfare. The subsequent success of Spinola's siege of Breda did not change this decision, and Spain adopted a defensive stance militarily in the Netherlands. Maurice died in April 1625, aged 58. Ignoring orders, the Spanish commander Spinola succeeded in conquering the city of Breda on 5 June 1625. The war was now more focused on trade, much of it in between the Dutch and the Dunkirkers, but also on Dutch attacks on Spanish convoys, and above all the seizure of the undermanned Portuguese trading forts and ill-defended territories.

=== The Republic during Maurice's final years (1621–1625) ===
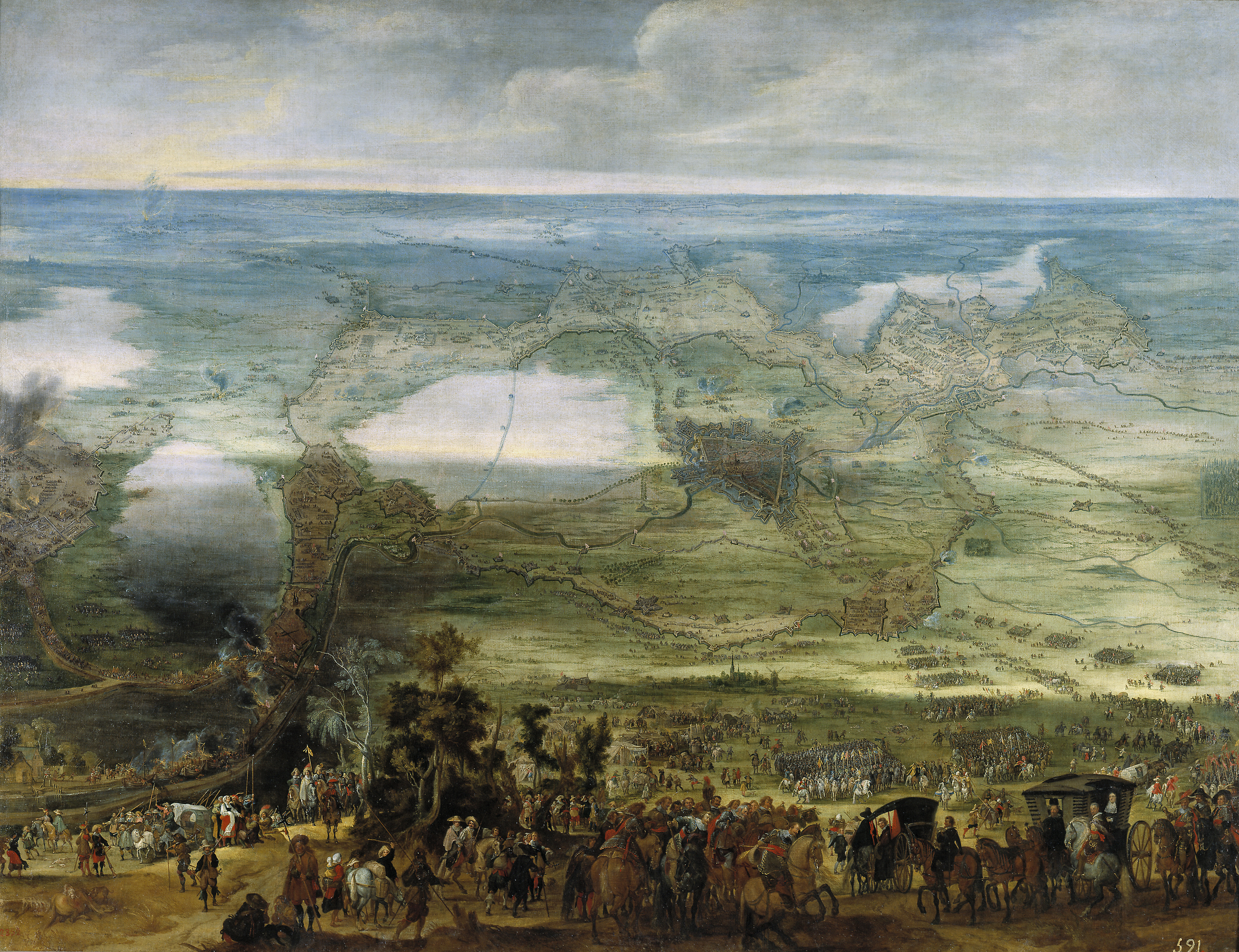
Painting of the siege of Breda in 1624

The administrative situation of the Dutch government deteriorated in Maurice's last years. He had been too successful in gathering all the reins of government in his own hands after his coup in 1618. He completely dominated Dutch politics and diplomacy in his first years afterwards, even monopolising the abortive peace talks before the expiration of the truce. Likewise the political Counter-Remonstrants were temporarily in total control, but the downside was that his government was overextended, with too few people doing the heavy lifting at the local level, which was essential to make the government machine run smoothly in the highly decentralised Dutch polity. Holland's conventional role as leader of the political process was temporarily vacated, as Holland as a power center was eliminated. Maurice had to do everything by himself with his small band of aristocratic managers in the States-General. This situation deteriorated even more when he had to spend long periods in the field as commander-in-chief, during which he was unable to personally direct affairs in The Hague. His health soon deteriorated, also detracting from his efficacy as a political and military leader. The regime, depending on Maurice's personal qualities as a virtual dictator, therefore came under unbearable strain.

In the period up to Maurice's death in April 1625, the strategic and military position of the Republic therefore deteriorated as well. It had to increase the standing army to 48,000 men in 1622, just to hold the defensive ring of fortresses, while Spain increased the Army of Flanders to 60,000 men at the same time. This put a great strain on the Republic's finances at a time when tax rates were already dangerously high. Yet at the same time the Republic had no other option than to sustain the imploding German Protestant forces financially. For that reason the Dutch paid for the army of Count Ernst von Mansfeld that was cowering on the Dutch border in East Friesland after its defeats by the Spanish and Imperial forces; it was hoped that in this way a complete encirclement of the Republic could be avoided. For a while the Republic pinned its hope on Christian the Younger of Brunswick. However, his Dutch-financed army was crushed at Stadtlohn, near the Dutch border by the forces of the Catholic League under Tilly in August 1623. This setback necessitated a reinforcement of the Dutch IJssel line. Spinola failed to take advantage of the new situation, lulled into complacency by Maurice's unceasing peace-feelers, but would start besieging Breda in August 1624. Meanwhile, on 10 June 1624, the Dutch Republic signed the Treaty of Compiègne (1624) with Louis XIII of France, in which the latter agreed to support the Dutch military effort with an annual subsidy of a million guilders (7% of the Dutch war budget).

=== Economic warfare (1620s) ===
Although Spain took a defensive stance, economic warfare was intensified in a way that amounted to a veritable siege of the Republic as a whole. In the first place, the naval war intensified. The Spanish Navy harassed Dutch shipping, which had to sail through the Strait of Gibraltar to Italy and the Levant, thereby forcing the Dutch to sail in convoys with naval escorts. The cost of this was borne by the merchants in the form of a special tax, used to finance the Dutch navy, but this increased the shipping rates the Dutch had to charge, and their maritime insurance premiums also were higher, thus making Dutch shipping less competitive. Spain also increased the presence of its navy in Dutch home waters, in the form of the armada of Flanders, and the great number of privateers, the Dunkirkers, both based in the Southern Netherlands. Though these Spanish naval forces were not strong enough to contest Dutch naval supremacy, Spain waged a very successful Guerre de Course, especially against the Dutch herring fisheries, despite attempts by the Dutch to blockade the Flemish coast.

The Low Countries in 1629 Dutch Republic Spanish Netherlands Prince-Bishopric of Liège

The Dutch herring trade, an important pillar of the economy, was much hurt by other forms of economic warfare, the embargo on salt for preserving herring, and the blockade of the inland waterways to the Dutch hinterland, which were an important transportation route for Dutch transit trade. The Dutch were used to procuring their salt from Portugal and the Caribbean islands. Alternative salt supplies were available from France, but the French salt had a high magnesium content, which made it less suitable for herring preservation. When the supplies in the Spanish sphere of influence were cut off, the Dutch economy was therefore dealt a heavy blow. The salt embargo was just a part of the more general embargo on Dutch shipping and trade that Spain instituted after 1621. The bite of this embargo grew only gradually, because the Dutch at first tried to evade it by putting their trade in neutral bottoms, like the ships of the Hanseatic League and England. Spanish merchants tried to evade it, as the embargo also did great harm to Spanish economic interests, even to the extent that for a time a famine threatened in Spanish Naples when the Dutch-carried grain trade was cut off. Realizing that the local authorities often sabotaged the embargo, the Spanish crown built up an elaborate enforcement apparatus, the Almirantazgo de los países septentrionales (Admiralty of the northern countries) in 1624 to make it more effective. Part of the new system was a network of inspectors in neutral ports who inspected neutral shipping for goods with a Dutch connection and supplied certificates that protected neutral shippers against confiscation in Spanish ports. The English and Hanseatics were only too happy to comply, and so contributed to the effectiveness of the embargo.

The embargo grew to be an effective direct and indirect impediment for Dutch trade, as not only the direct trade between the Amsterdam Entrepôt and the lands of the Spanish Empire was affected, but also the parts of Dutch trade that indirectly depended on it: Baltic grain and naval stores destined for Spain were now provided by others, depressing the Dutch trade with the Baltic area, and the carrying trade between Spain and Italy now shifted to English shipping. The embargo was a double-edged sword, however, as some Spanish and Portuguese export activities likewise collapsed as a consequence (such as the Valencian and Portuguese salt exports).

Spain was also able to physically close off inland waterways for Dutch river traffic after 1625. The Dutch were thus also deprived of their important transit trade with the neutral Prince-Bishopric of Liège, not a part of the Spanish Netherlands, and the German hinterland. Dutch butter and cheese prices collapsed as a result of this blockade (and rose steeply in the affected import areas), as did wine and herring prices (the Dutch monopolised the French wine trade at the time). The steep price rises in the Spanish Netherlands were sometimes accompanied by food shortages, however, leading to an eventual relaxation of this embargo. It was eventually abandoned, because it deprived the Brussels authorities of important revenues from custom duties.

The economic warfare measures of Spain were effective in the sense that they depressed economic activity in the Netherlands, thereby also depressing Dutch fiscal resources to finance the war effort but also by structurally altering European trade relations, at least until the end of the war, after which they reverted in favour of the Dutch. Neutral nations benefited, but both Dutch and Spanish areas suffered economically, though not uniformly, as some industrial regions benefited from the artificial restriction of trade, which had a protectionist effect. The "new draperies" textile industry in Holland permanently lost ground to its competitors in Flanders and England, though this was compensated for by a shift to more expensive high-quality woollens. Nevertheless, the economic pressure, and the slump of trade and industry it caused, was not sufficient to bring the Republic to its knees. There were a number of reasons for this. The chartered companies, the United East India Company (VOC) and the Dutch West India Company (WIC), provided employment on a large enough scale to compensate for the slump in other forms of trade and their trade brought great revenues. Supplying the armies, both in the Netherlands and in Germany, proved a boon for the agricultural areas in the Dutch inland provinces.

=== Strengthening of the Dutch Republic (1625–1628) ===
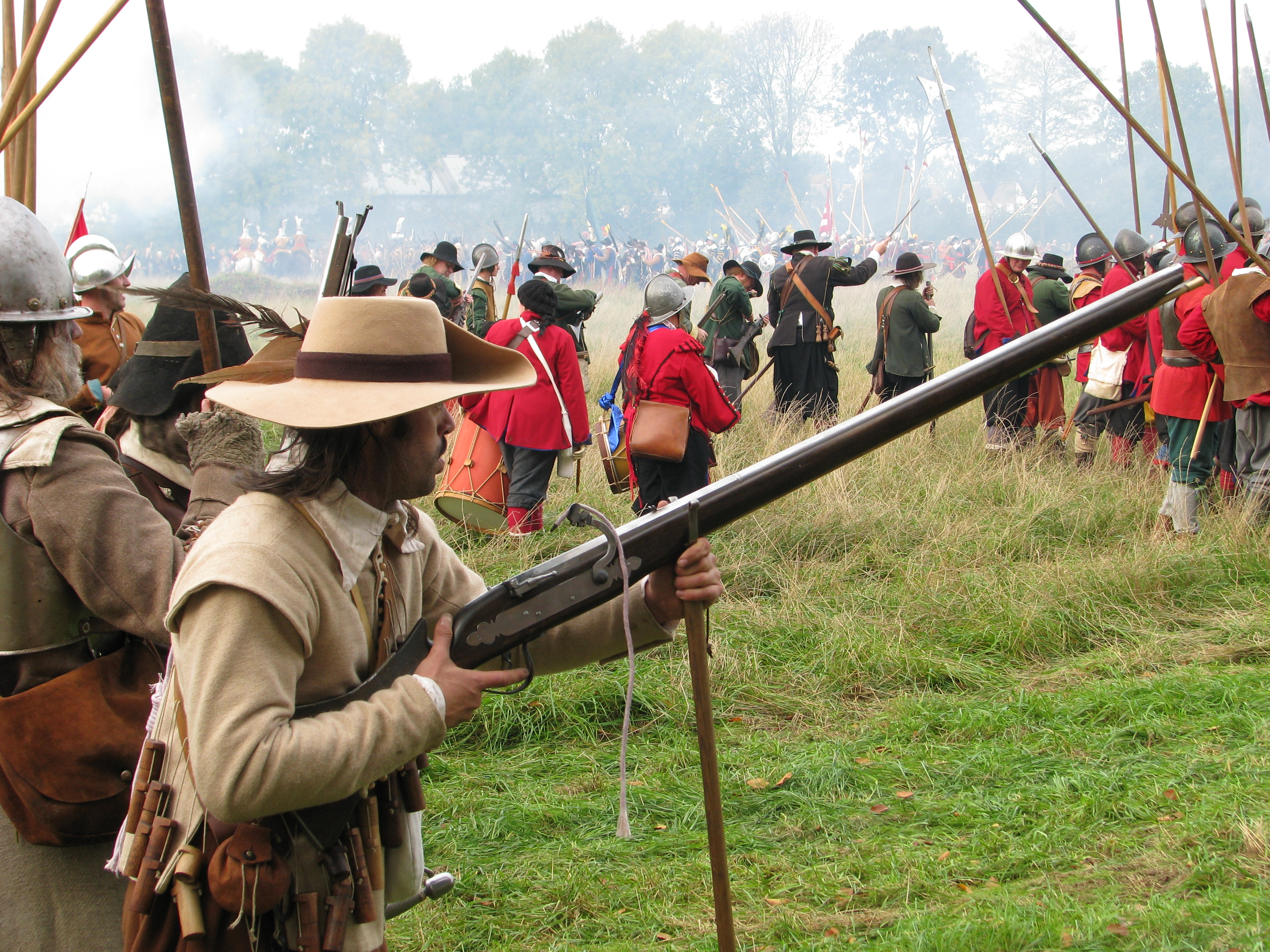
Modern re-enactment of the siege of Groenlo in 1627

The fiscal situation of the Dutch government improved after the death of Maurice in April 1625. He was succeeded as Prince of Orange and commander of the Dutch States armed forces by his half-brother Frederick Henry, Prince of Orange. It took several months, however, to obtain his appointment as stadtholder of Holland and Zeeland, as it took time to agree on the terms of his commission. This deprived the regime of leadership in a crucial time. During this time the moderate Calvinist regents staged a return in Holland at the expense of the radical Counter-Remonstrants. This was an important development, as Frederick Henry could not lean exclusively on the latter faction, but instead took a position "above the parties", playing the two factions against one another. A side effect of this was that more normal political relations returned to the Republic, with Holland returning to its central political position. Also, the persecution of the Remonstrants now abated with the Prince's connivance, and with this renewed climate of tolerance, political stability in the Republic also improved.

This improvement in internal affairs helped the Republic overcome the difficult years of the sharpest economic warfare. During the lull in the military pressure by Spain after the fall of Breda in 1625, the Republic was able to steadily increase its standing army, owing to its improved financial situation. This enabled the new stadtholder of Friesland and Groningen, Ernst Casimir, to recapture Oldenzaal, forcing the Spanish troops to evacuate Overijssel. Diplomatically, the situation improved once England entered the war in 1625 as an ally. Frederick Henry cleared the Spanish from eastern Gelderland in 1627 after recapturing Grol. The Dutch victory in the Battle in the Bay of Matanzas in 1628, in which a Spanish treasure fleet was captured by Piet Pieterszoon Hein, contributed even more to the improving fiscal situation, at the same time depriving Spain of much-needed money. However, the greatest contribution to the improvement of the Dutch position in 1628 was that Spain had overextended itself again when it participated in the War of the Mantuan Succession. This caused such a depletion of Spanish troops and financial resources in the theatre of war in the Netherlands that the Republic for the time being achieved a strategic superiority: the Army of Flanders declined to 55,000 men while the States Army reached 58,000 in 1627.

== The Republic sallies forth (1629–1635) ==
=== Siege of 's-Hertogenbosch (1629) ===
Meanwhile, the Imperial forces had surged in Germany after an initial setback from the intervention of Christian IV of Denmark in the war in 1625. Both the Danes and Mansfelt were defeated in 1626, and the Catholic League occupied the northern German lands that had hitherto acted as a buffer zone for the Republic. For a while in 1628 an invasion of the eastern part of the Republic seemed imminent. However, the relative might of Spain, the main player up to now in the German civil war, was ebbing fast. By April 1629 the States Army counted 77,000 soldiers, half as much again as the Army of Flanders at that point in time. This allowed Frederick Henry to raise a mobile army of 28,000 (the other troops were used in the fixed garrisons of the Republic) and invest 's-Hertogenbosch. During the siege of this strategic fortress city, the Imperial and Spanish allies launched a diversionary attack from Germany's IJssel line. After crossing this river, they invaded the Dutch heartland, getting as far as the city of Amersfoort, which promptly surrendered. The States General, however, mobilised civic militias and scrounged garrison troops from fortresses all around the country, assembling an army that at the height of the emergency numbered no less than 128,000 troops. This enabled Frederick Henry to maintain his siege of 's-Hertogenbosch. When Dutch troops surprised the Spanish fortress of Wesel, which acted as the principal Spanish supply base, this forced the invaders to retreat to the IJssel. 's-Hertogenbosch surrendered in September 1629 to Frederick Henry. This town, largest in the northern part of Brabant, had been considered impregnable to attack. Its loss was a serious blow to the Spanish. According to Israel (1998), the fall of 's-Hertogenbosch represented "a shattering blow to Spanish prestige" and was 'epoch-making' for the fact that, for the first time in the war, the Dutch appeared to enjoy overall strategic superiority. The event caused Philip IV to overrule his ministers and offer an unconditional truce, which was rejected.

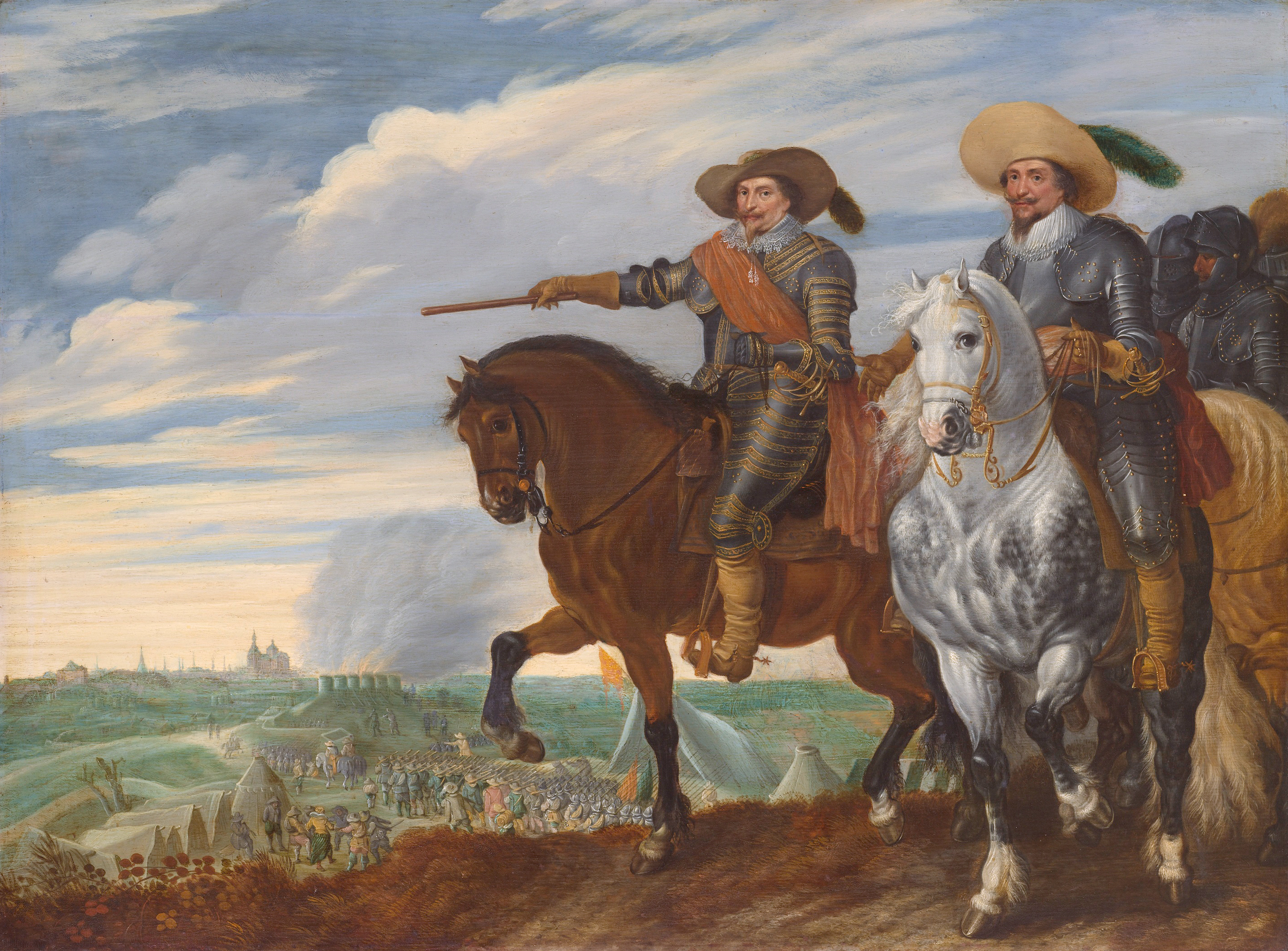
Frederick Henry and Ernst Casimir at the siege of 's-Hertogenbosch by Pauwels van Hillegaert

=== Political deadlock (1630–1631) ===
The capture of Wesel and 's-Hertogenbosch (a city that had been fortified according to the most modern standards, often incorporating Dutch innovations in fortification), in short succession, caused a sensation in Europe. It demonstrated that the Dutch, for the moment, enjoyed strategic superiority. 's-Hertogenbosch was the linchpin of the ring of Spanish fortifications in Brabant; its loss left a gaping hole in the Spanish front. Thoroughly shaken, Philip IV now overruled Olivares and offered an unconditional truce. The States General refused to consider this offer until the Imperial forces had left Dutch territory. Only after this had been accomplished did they remit the Spanish offer to the States of the provinces for consideration. The popular debate that followed split the provinces. Friesland, Groningen and Zeeland, predictably, rejected the proposal. Frederick Henry appears to have favoured it personally, but he was hampered by the political divisions in the province of Holland where radical Counter-Remonstrants and moderates were unable to agree. The Counter-Remonstrants urged in guarded terms a final eradication of "Remonstrant" tendencies in the Republic (thus establishing internal "unity") before a truce could even be considered. The radical Calvinist preachers urged a "liberation" of more of the Spanish Netherlands. Shareholders in the WIC dreaded the prospect of a truce in the Americas, which would thwart the plans of that company to stage an invasion of Portuguese Brazil. The peace party and the war party in the States of Holland therefore perfectly balanced each other and deadlock ensued. Nothing was decided during 1629 and 1630.

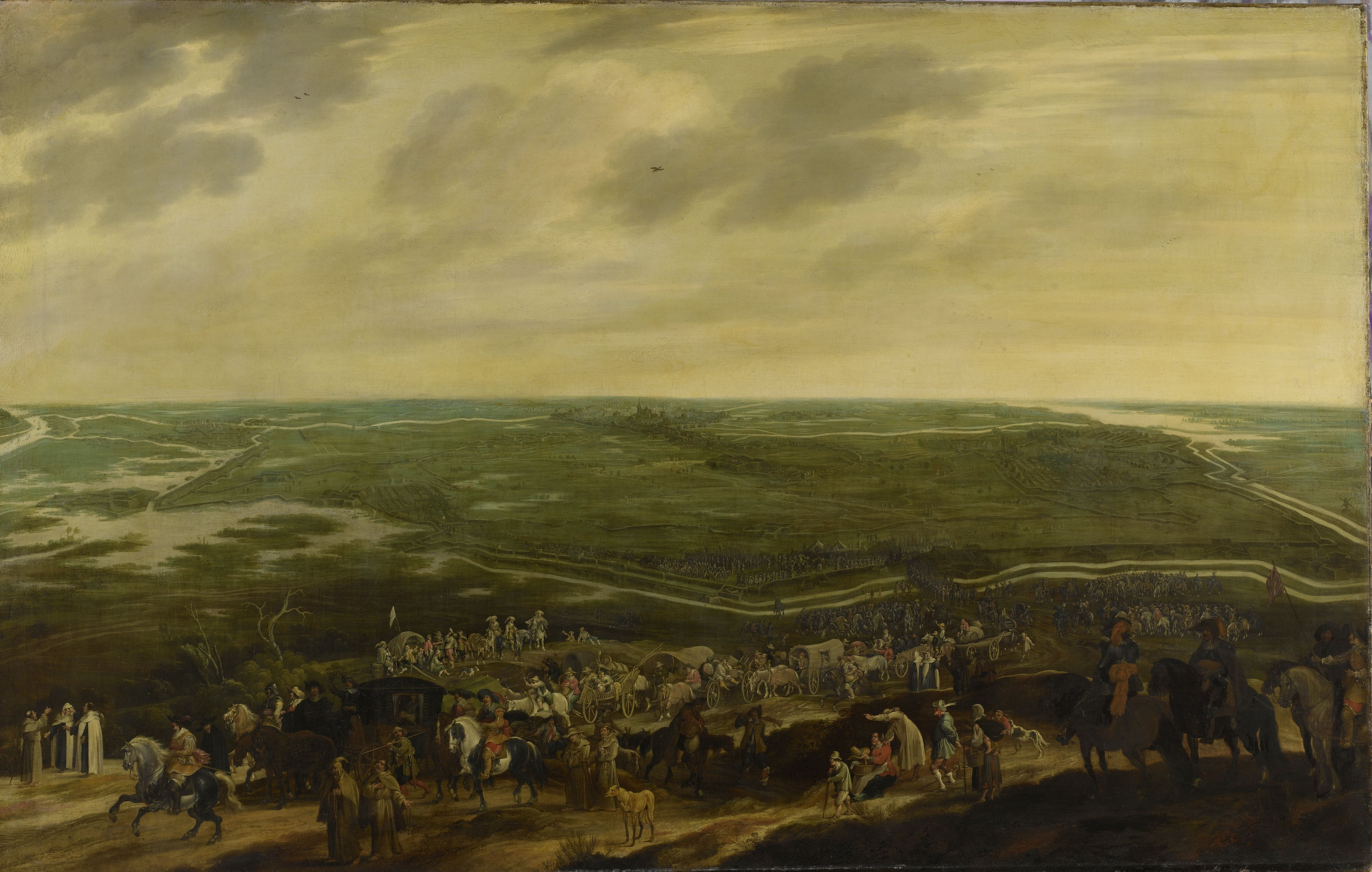
The defeated Spanish garrison leaving 's-Hertogenbosch, 17 September 1629

To break the deadlock in the States of Holland, Frederick Henry planned a sensational offensive in 1631. He intended to invade Flanders and make a deep thrust toward Dunkirk, as his brother had done in 1600. His expedition was even larger. He embarked 30,000 men and 80 field guns on 3,000 rivercraft for his amphibious descent on IJzendijke. From there he penetrated to the Bruges-Ghent canal that the Brussels government had dug to circumvent the Dutch blockade of the coastal waters. However, at this time a sizeable Spanish force appeared to his rear, which caused a row with panicky deputies-in-the-field that sought to manage the campaign for the States General. The civilians prevailed, and a very angry Frederick Henry had to order an ignominious retreat of the Dutch invading force. On 12 and 13 September 1631, the Dutch won the naval Battle of the Slaak which prevented the Spanish from dividing the Dutch Republic.

=== Meuse campaign and failed negotiations (1632–1634) ===
Finally, in 1632, Frederick Henry was allowed to deliver a significant strike by launching a Meuse campaign, in a pincer move to prepare for the conquest of the major cities of the Southern Netherlands. The initial move in his offensive was to have a reluctant States General publish (over the objections of the radical Calvinists) a proclamation promising that the free exercise of the Catholic religion would be guaranteed in places that the Dutch army would conquer that year. The inhabitants of the Southern Netherlands were invited to "throw off the yoke of the Spaniards". This piece of propaganda would prove to be very effective. Frederick Henry now invaded the Meuse valley with 30,000 troops. He took Venlo, Roermond, and Sittard in short order. As promised, the Catholic churches and clergy were left unmolested. Then, on 8 June, he laid siege to Maastricht. A desperate effort of Spanish and Imperialist forces to relieve the city failed and on 20 August 1632, Frederick Henry sprang his mines, breaching the walls of the city. It capitulated three days later. Here also, the Catholic religion was allowed to remain.

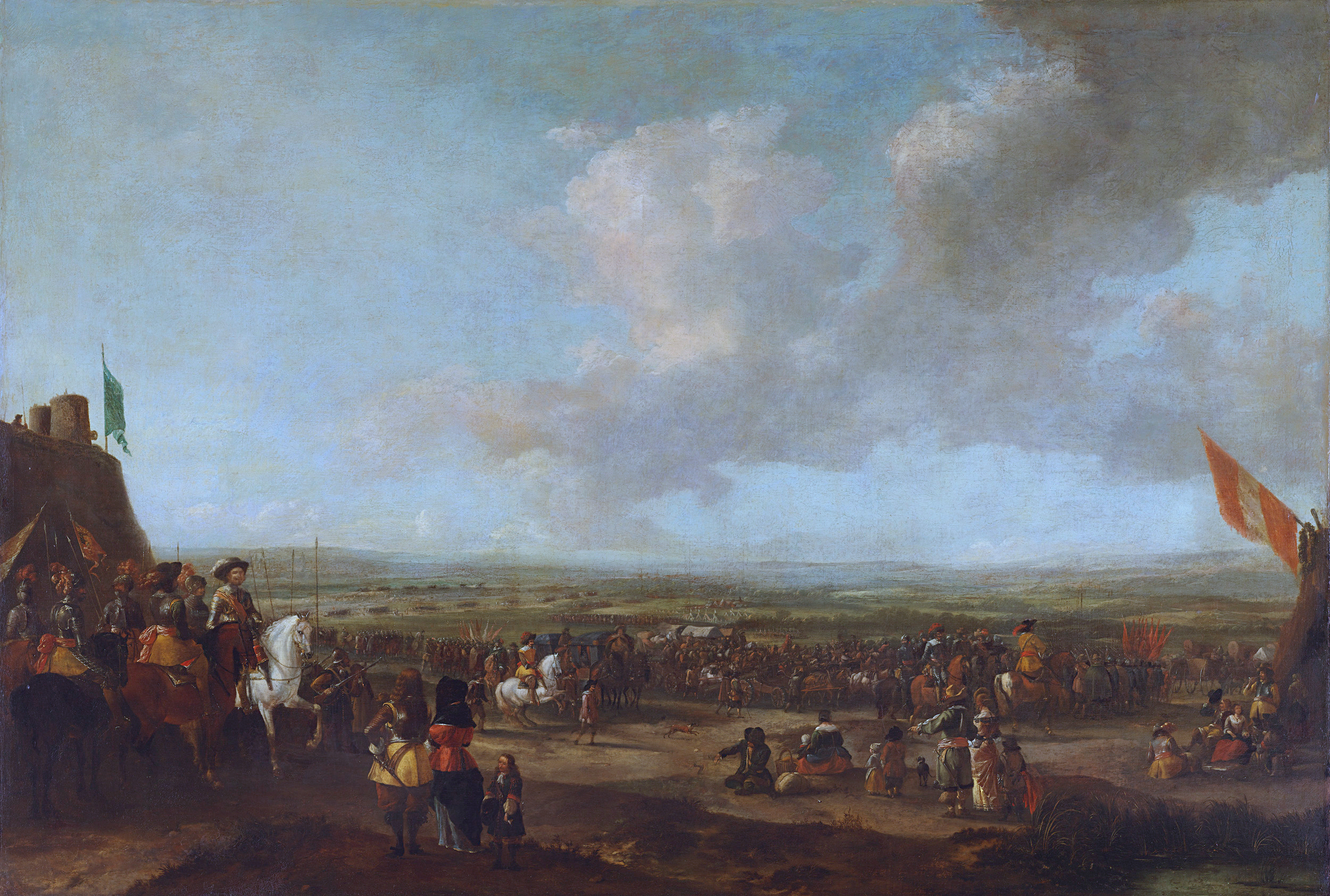
Frederik Hendrik at the surrender of Maastricht, 22 August 1632

The Infanta Isabella was now forced to convene the Southern provinces' States General for the first time since her inauguration in 1598. They met in September (as it turned out for the last time under Spanish rule). Most Southern provinces advocated immediate peace talks with the Republic so as to preserve the integrity of the South and the free exercise of the Catholic religion. A Southern States General delegation met the States General of the Republic, represented by its deputies-in-the-field in Maastricht. The southern delegates offered to negotiate on the strength of the authorisation given in 1629 by Philip IV. However, Philip and Olivares secretly cancelled this authorisation, as they considered the initiative of the southern States General a "usurpation" of royal power, and did not intend to honour any agreement that might ensue.

On the Dutch side, there was the usual disunity. Frederick Henry hoped to achieve a quick result, but Friesland, Groningen, and Zeeland opposed the talks outright, while divided Holland dithered. Eventually, those four provinces authorised talks with only the southern provinces, leaving Spain out. Evidently, such an approach would make the resulting agreement worthless, as it was Spain, not the southern provinces, that possessed troops. The peace party in the Republic finally brought about meaningful negotiations in December 1632, when valuable time had already been lost, enabling Spain to send reinforcements. Both sides presented demands that were irreconcilable at first, but after much palaver the southern demands were reduced to the evacuation of Portuguese Brazil (which had been invaded by the WIC in 1630) by the Dutch. In return, they offered Breda and an indemnity for the WIC for giving up Brazil. The Dutch (over the opposition of the war party that considered the demands too lenient) reduced its demands to Breda, Geldern and the Meierij area around 's-Hertogenbosch, in addition to tariff concessions in the South. Furthermore, as they realised that Spain would never concede Brazil, they proposed to limit the peace to Europe, continuing the war overseas.

By June 1633 the talks were on the verge of collapse. A shift in Dutch politics ensued that would prove fateful for the Republic. Frederick Henry, sensing that the talks were going nowhere, proposed to put an ultimatum to the other side to accept the Dutch demands. However, he lost the support of the "peace party" in Holland, led by Amsterdam. These regents wanted to offer further concessions to gain peace. The peace party gained the upper hand in Holland, for the first time since 1618 standing up to the stadtholder and the Counter-Remonstrants. Frederick Henry, however, managed to gain the support of the majority of the other provinces and those voted on 9 December 1633 (overruling Holland and Overijssel) to break off the talks. Despite gaining the fortresses along the Meuse, Dutch attempts in the next years to attack Antwerp and Brussels would fail. The Dutch were disappointed by the lack of support they received from the Southern population.

== Franco-Dutch Alliance (1635–1640) ==
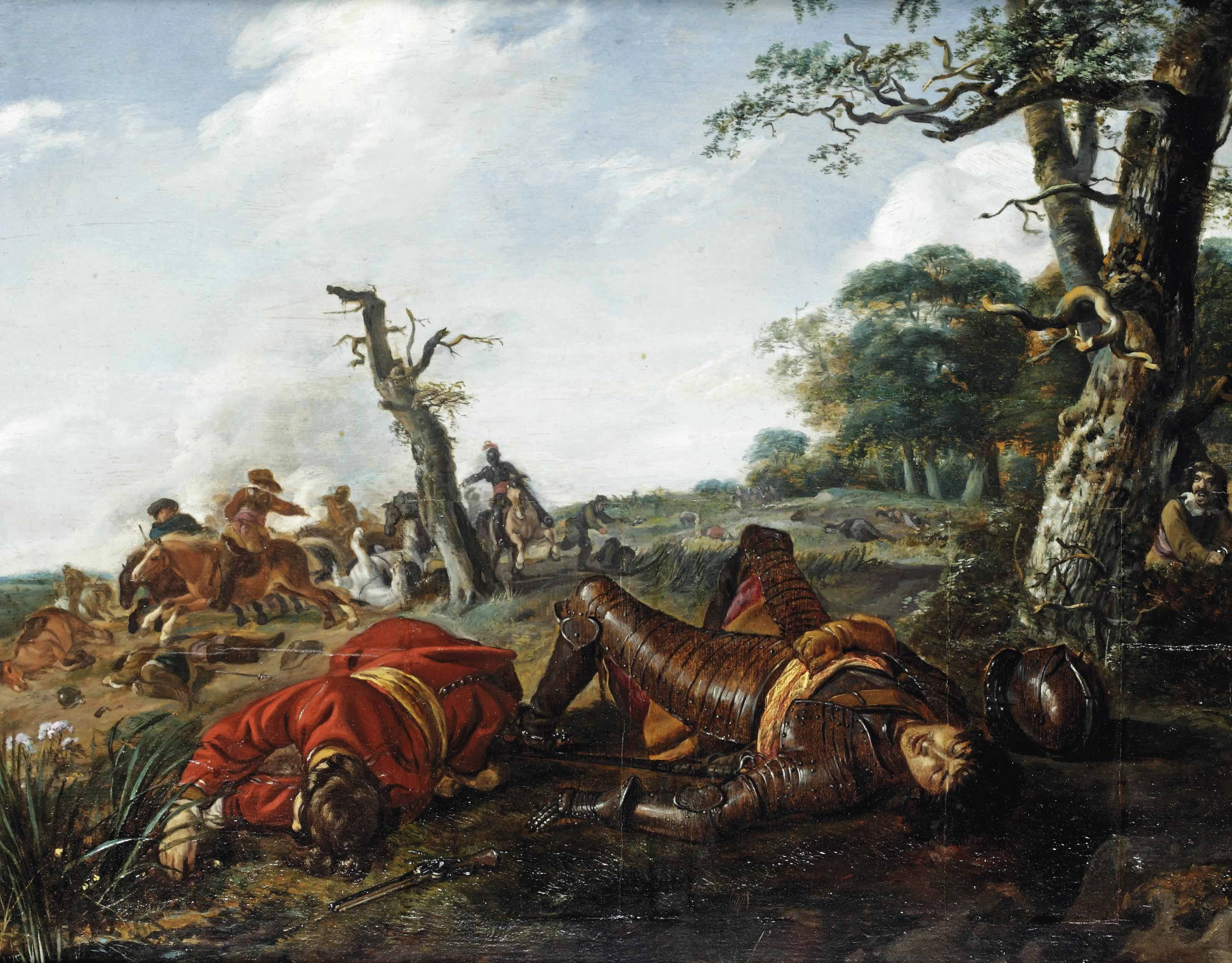
A battle scene from the Eighty Years' War by Jan Martszen de Jonge

With the peace negotiations dragging on, events elsewhere in Europe of course had not stood still. While Spain was busy fighting the Mantuan war, the Swedes had intervened in the Thirty Years' War in the Holy Roman Empire under Gustavus Adolphus in 1630, supported by French and Dutch subsidies. The Swedes improved upon the new Dutch infantry tactics (enhanced with improved cavalry tactics) with much more success against the Imperial forces than the German Protestants had done and so turned the tide of the war. However, once its war in northern Italy ended in 1631, Spain was able to bring its forces in the northern theatre of war up to strength again. The Cardinal-Infante Ferdinand brought a well trained, experienced Spanish army up the Spanish Road, and at the Battle of Nördlingen, in combination with Imperial forces, utilized his elite native Spanish tercios to rout the Swedish-Protestant forces on the Albuch before killing or capturing the majority of what remained. The Spanish prince then marched immediately to Brussels, where he succeeded the old Infanta Isabella who had died in December 1633. Spain's strength in the Southern Netherlands was now appreciably enhanced.

The Dutch, now with no prospect of peace with Spain, and faced with a resurgent Spanish force, decided to take the French overtures for an offensive alliance against Spain more seriously. This change in strategic policy was accompanied by a political sea-change within the Republic. The peace party around Amsterdam objected to the clause in the proposed treaty with France that bound the Republic's hands by prohibiting the conclusion of a separate peace with Spain. This would shackle the Republic to French policies and so constrain its independence. The resistance to the French alliance by the moderate regents caused a rupture in the relations with the stadtholder. Henceforth Frederick Henry would be much more closely aligned with the radical Counter-Remonstrants who supported the alliance. This political shift promoted the concentration of power and influence in the Republic in the hands of a small group of the stadtholder's favourites. These were the members of the several secrete besognes (secret committees) to which the States General more and more entrusted the conduct of diplomatic and military affairs. Unfortunately, this shift to secret policy-making by a few trusted courtiers also opened the way for foreign diplomats to influence policy-making with bribes. Some members of the inner circle performed prodigies of corruption. For instance, Cornelis Musch, the griffier (clerk) of the States General received 20,000 livres for his services in pushing the French treaty through from Cardinal Richelieu, while the pliable Grand Pensionary Jacob Cats (who had succeeded Adriaan Pauw, the leader of the opposition against the alliance) received 6,000 livres.

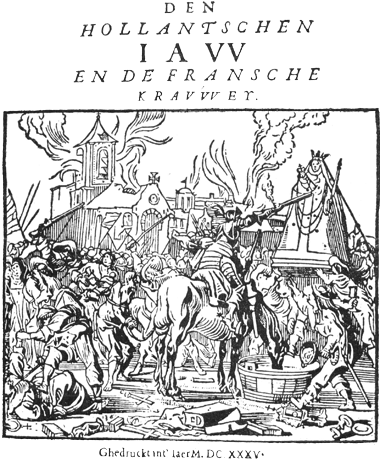
The 1635 Sack of Tienen as depicted in a contemporary newspaper

The Treaty of Alliance that was signed in Paris on 8 February 1635 committed the Republic to invade the Spanish Netherlands simultaneously with France later that year. The treaty previewed a partitioning of the Spanish Netherlands between the two invaders. If the inhabitants would rise against Spain, the Southern Netherlands would be afforded independence on the model of the cantons of Switzerland, though with the Flemish seacoast, Namur and Thionville annexed by France, and Breda, Geldern and Hulst going to the Republic. If the inhabitants resisted, the country would be partitioned outright, with the Romance-speaking provinces and western Flanders going to France, and the remainder to the Republic. The latter partitioning opened the prospect that Antwerp would be re-united with the Republic, and the Scheldt reopened for trade in that city, something Amsterdam was very much opposed to. The treaty also provided that the Catholic religion would be preserved in its entirety in the provinces to be apportioned to the Republic. This provision was understandable from the French point of view, as the French government had recently suppressed the Huguenots in their strongpoint of La Rochelle (with the support of the Dutch), and was generally reducing Protestant privileges. It enraged the radical Calvinists in the Republic, however. The treaty was not popular in the Republic for those reasons.

Dividing up the Spanish Netherlands proved more difficult than foreseen. Olivares had drawn up a strategy for this two-front war that proved very effective. Spain went on the defensive against the French forces that invaded in May 1635 and successfully held them at bay. The Franco-Dutch forces had some initial success: the Dutch repulsed a Spanish Siege of Philippine (8–20 May 1635), the French scored a victory at the Battle of Les Avins (20 May 1635), and the joint forces then accomplished the Capture of Tienen (8–10 June 1635). However, the capture of Tienen was followed by a savage sack of the city, with mass killings and rapes of the population. Finally, either deliberately or accidentally, a great fire broke out that destroyed most of the city (including a desecration of Catholic churches and cloisters), as well as costly food supplies and munitions that the French and Dutch needed for the rest of their campaign. Although cities such as Diest, Herentals and Aarschot immediately surrendered to the invaders in the aftermath, it was out to fear of suffering the same fate as Tienen, rather than support for the invasion. Any sympathies the civilian population of the Southern Netherlands may have had towards the Franco-Dutch alliance's promises of liberation from the Spanish suffered a serious blow due to the atrocities. The new generation raised in Flanders and Brabant, which had been thoroughly reconverted to Roman Catholicism, now distrusted the Calvinist Dutch even more than it loathed the Spanish occupiers. The French and Dutch leaders were greatly embarrassed and started to blame each other for the sack, with Frederick Henry taking some disciplinary measures in an attempt to deflect some of the blame. The Spanish government in Brussels exploited the Sack of Tienen successfully for anti-rebellion and anti-Protestant propaganda to further discourage any Southern uprising in support of the Franco-Dutch invasion. The Cardinal-Infante's official declaration of war on France made explicit mention of the atrocities committed against 'the town of Tienen, God, the Sacraments and churches, priests, religious men and women, elderly, women and children'.

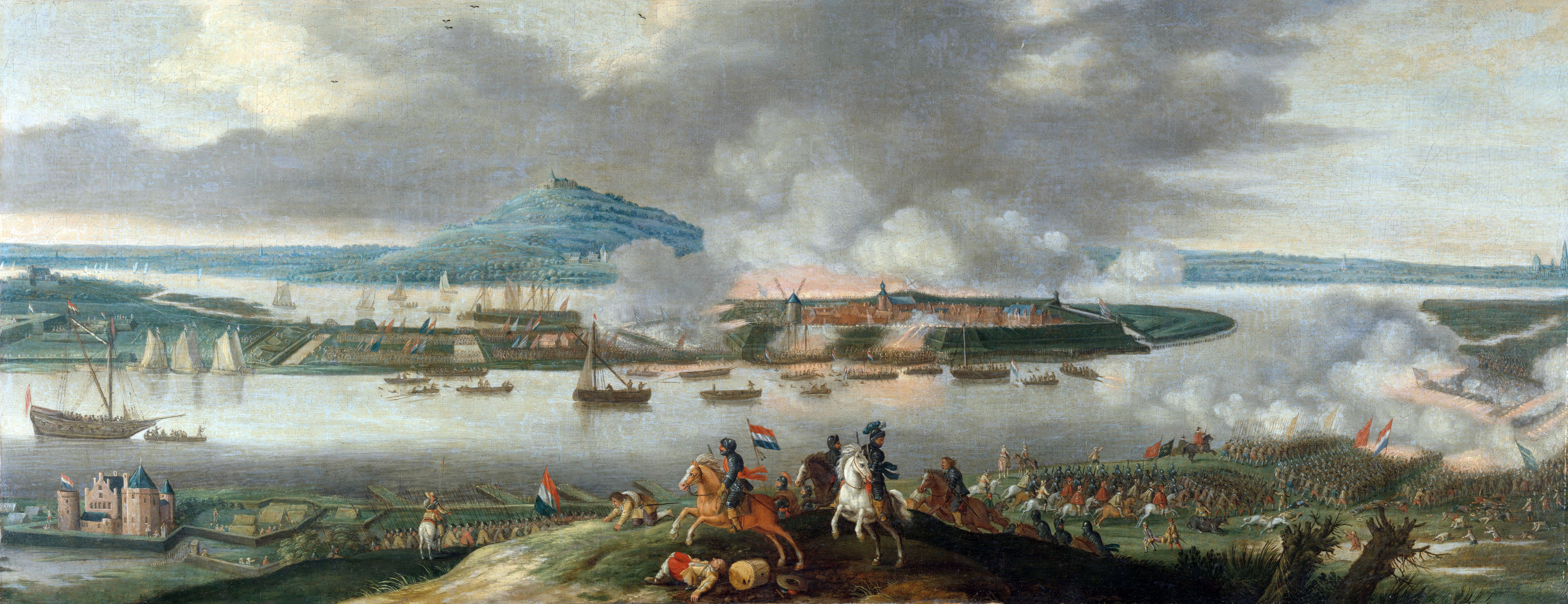
Siege of the Schenkenschans by Gerrit van Santen

The Siege of Leuven (24 June – 4 July 1635) was a disaster for the combined Franco-Dutch forces. The Cardinal-Infante brought his full offensive forces to bear on the Dutch. The Army of Flanders now again numbered 70,000 men, which was at least at parity with the Dutch forces. Once the force of the double invasion by France and the Republic had been broken, these troops emerged from their fortresses and attacked the areas recently conquered by the Dutch in a pincer movement. Despite desperate efforts, the Dutch and their allies were not able to prevent Spanish forces from taking the towns of Limbourg, Gennep, Diest, and Goch around the south and east of the Republic. A party of German mercenaries, roaming on the Cardinal-Infrante's left flank, captured the unprepared Dutch fortress of Schenkenschans on the night of 27/28 July. This strategically important fort was situated on an island in the Rhine near Cleves and dominated the "back door" into the Dutch heartland along the north bank of the river Rhine. Cleves itself was soon captured by a combined Spanish-Imperial force and Spanish forces overran the Meierij.

The Republic could not let the capture of the fort at Schenkenschans stand. Frederick Henry therefore immediately concentrated a huge force to besiege the fortress even during the winter months of 1635–36. The garrison held out tenaciously, inflicting great losses on the Dutch. Olivares hoped that by holding onto the fort, the threat of an unhindered Spanish invasion of Gelderland and Utrecht would force the Republic to give in to a favorable peace and allow the Spanish to concentrate on the French. However, the combined Franco-Dutch threat had overstretched Spanish forces, which did not launch the much anticipated invasion of the Republic's heartland, despite their many recent successes, and after a costly nine month siege, the Dutch stadtholder forced the surrender of the Spanish garrison in Schenkenschans in April 1636. This was a severe blow for Spain.

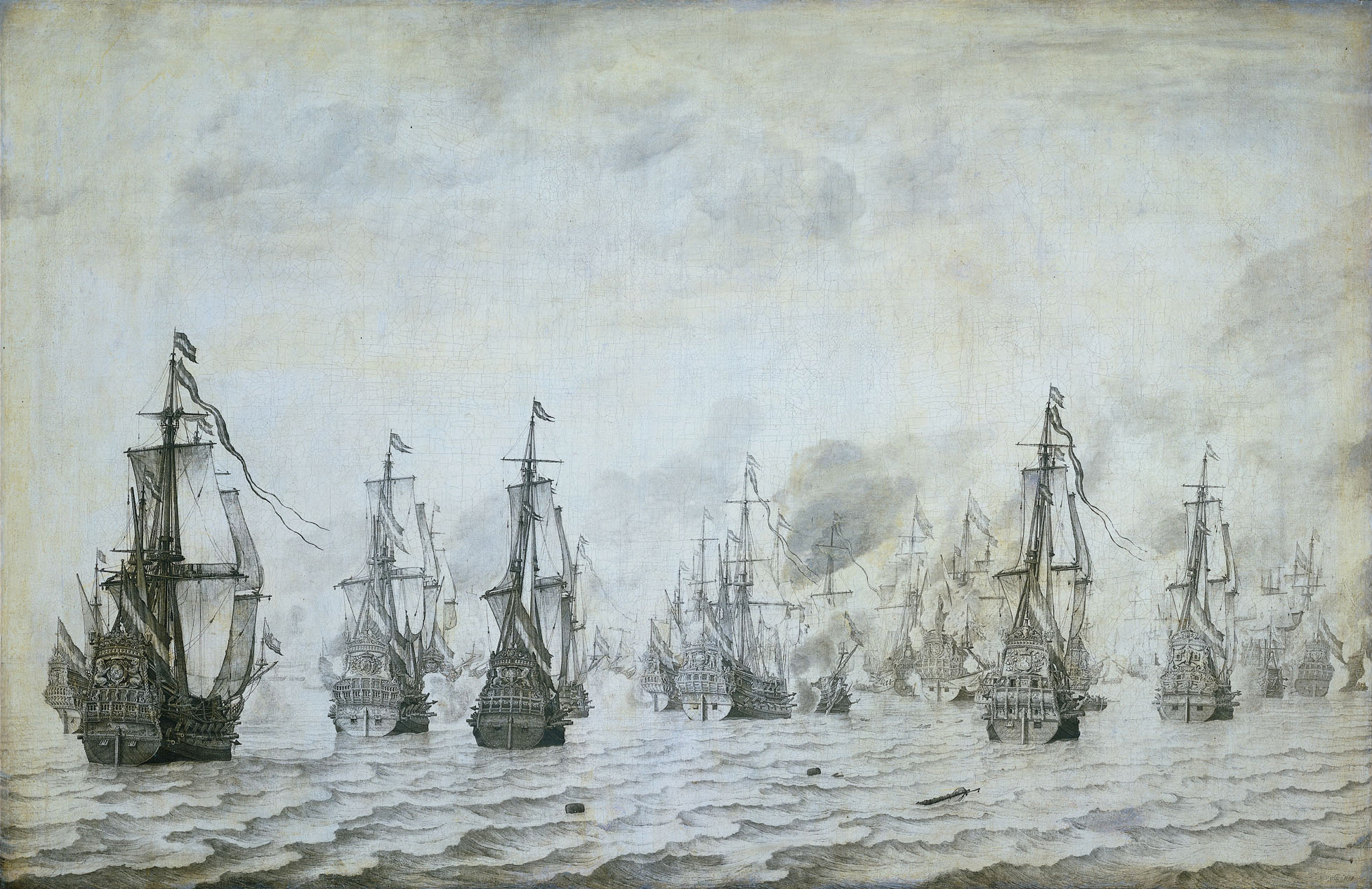
The naval battle against the Spanish near Dunkerque, 18 February 1639

The next year, thanks to the fact that the Cardinal-Infante shifted the focus of his campaign to the French border in that year, Frederick Henry managed to recapture Breda with a relatively small force (21 July – 11 October 1637). This operation, which engaged his forces for a full season, was to be his last success for a long time, as the peace party in the Republic, over his objections, managed to cut war expenditure and shrink the size of the Dutch army. These savings were pushed through despite the fact that the economic situation in the Republic had improved appreciably in the 1630s, following the economic slump of the 1620s caused by the Spanish embargoes. The Spanish river blockade had ended in 1629, while the conclusion of the Polish–Swedish War that same year ended the disruption of Dutch Baltic trade. The outbreak of the Franco-Spanish War (1635) closed the alternate trade route through France for Flemish exports, forcing the South to pay the heavy Dutch wartime tariffs. Increased German demand for foodstuffs and military supplies as a consequence of military developments in that country, contributed to the economic boom in the Republic, as did successes of the VOC in the Indies and the WIC in the Americas (where the WIC had gained a foothold in Portuguese Brazil after its 1630 invasion, and now conducted a thriving sugar trade). The boom generated much income and savings, but there were few investment possibilities in trade, due to the persisting Spanish trade embargoes. As a consequence, the Republic experienced a number of speculative bubbles in housing, land (the lakes in North Holland were drained during this period), and, notoriously, in tulips. Despite this economic upswing, which translated into increased fiscal revenues, the Dutch regents showed little enthusiasm for maintaining the high level of military expenditures of the middle 1630s. The failure of the Battle of Kallo of June 1638 did little to get more support for Frederick Henry's campaigns in the next few years. These proved unsuccessful; his colleague-in-arms Hendrik Casimir, the Frisian stadtholder died in battle during the unsuccessful siege of Hulst in 1640.

Maarten Tromp just before the Battle of the Downs, 1639.

However, the Republic gained major victories at other locations. The war with France had closed the Spanish Road for Spain, making it difficult for the latter to call up reinforcements from Italy. Olivares therefore decided to send 20,000 troops by sea from Spain in a large armada. This fleet was defeated by the Dutch navy under Maarten Tromp and Witte Corneliszoon de With in the Battle of the Downs of 31 October 1639, but despite the Dutch propaganda celebrating the victory, most of the Spanish troops and money managed to reach their intended destination. Some have seen this naval victory as proof that the Republic now possessed the strongest navy in the world; the English Royal Navy, meanwhile, was forced to stand by impotently while the battle raged in English territorial waters.

== Colonial theatre ==
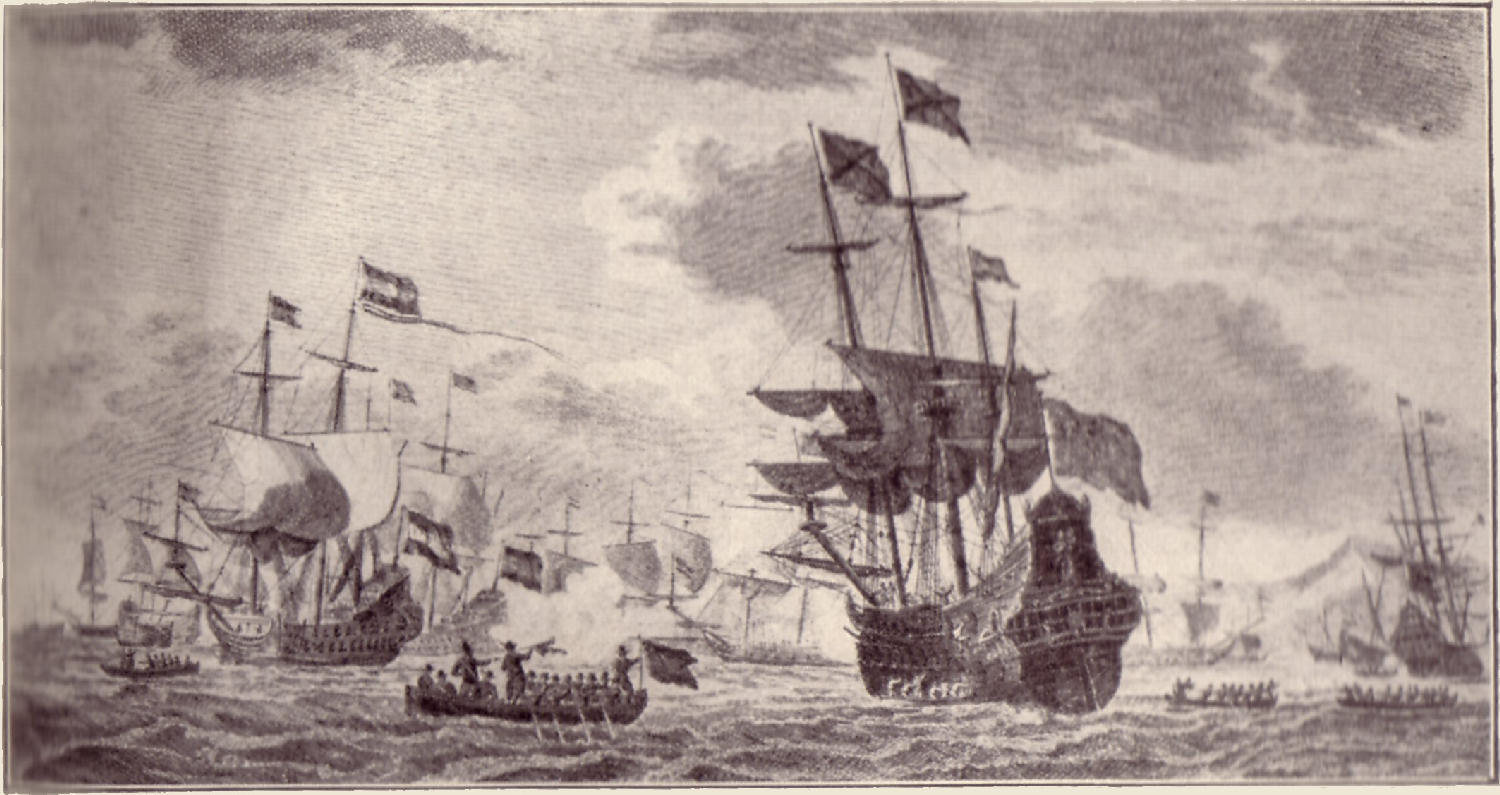
Piet Hein capturing the Spanish silver fleet in the 1628 Battle in the Bay of Matanzas. The Story of New Netherland, Chapter 27 (1909).

As more European countries began to build their empires, wars between countries extended to colonies as well. Battles for profitable colonies were fought as far away as Macau, the East Indies, Ceylon, Formosa (Taiwan), the Philippines, Brazil, and elsewhere. The most important of these conflicts would become known as the Dutch-Portuguese War. The Dutch carved out a trading empire all over the world, using their dominance at sea to great advantage. The Dutch East India Company was founded to administer all Dutch trade with the East, while the Dutch West India Company did the same for the West.

In the Western colonies, the States General mostly restricted itself to supporting privateering by its captains in the Caribbean to drain the Spanish coffers and fill its own. The most successful of these raids was the capture of the larger part of the Spanish treasure fleet by Piet Hein in the 1628 Battle in the Bay of Matanzas, which allowed Frederick Henry to finance the siege of 's-Hertogenbosch, and seriously troubled Spanish payments of troops. But attempts were also made to conquer existing colonies or found new ones in Brazil, North America, and Africa. Most of these would be only briefly or partially successful. In the East the activities led to the conquest of many profitable trading colonies, a major factor in bringing about the Dutch Golden Age.

In Asia and the Americas, the war had gone well for the Dutch. Those parts of the war were mainly fought by proxies, especially the Dutch West and East India companies. These companies, under charter from the Republic, possessed quasi-sovereign powers, including the power to make war and conclude treaties on behalf of the Republic.

In the Caribbean theatre, the WIC established a foothold in 1630 by setting up an outpost on salt-rich Saint Martin, one of the Leeward Islands, but the Spanish captured the island in 1633, leading the WIC to shift their focus to the Leeward Antilles. In 1634, company forces under Johannes van Walbeeck invaded the Spanish island of Curaçao, with its important salt resources. On August 21, after a three-week campaign, Lope López de Morla, the island's governor, agreed to a surrender that allowed him to leave for Venezuela unharmed on the condition that he take with him most of the islands native population. The islands of Bonaire – also rich in salt – and Aruba followed in 1636.

Peter Stuyvesant launched an expedition to retake Saint Martin in 1644, believing it would be a relatively easy task, but his forces were repelled by the Spanish defenders under the command of Guajardo Fajardo, and a cannonball hit Stuyvesant's leg, which ended up having to be amputated after he returned to the Netherlands. The damage inflicted by the attack would, however, convince the Spanish that Saint Martin was not worth holding onto, and they evacuated the island shortly before the war's end in 1648, allowing the Dutch to reclaim it, albeit while allowing the French to take half of it.

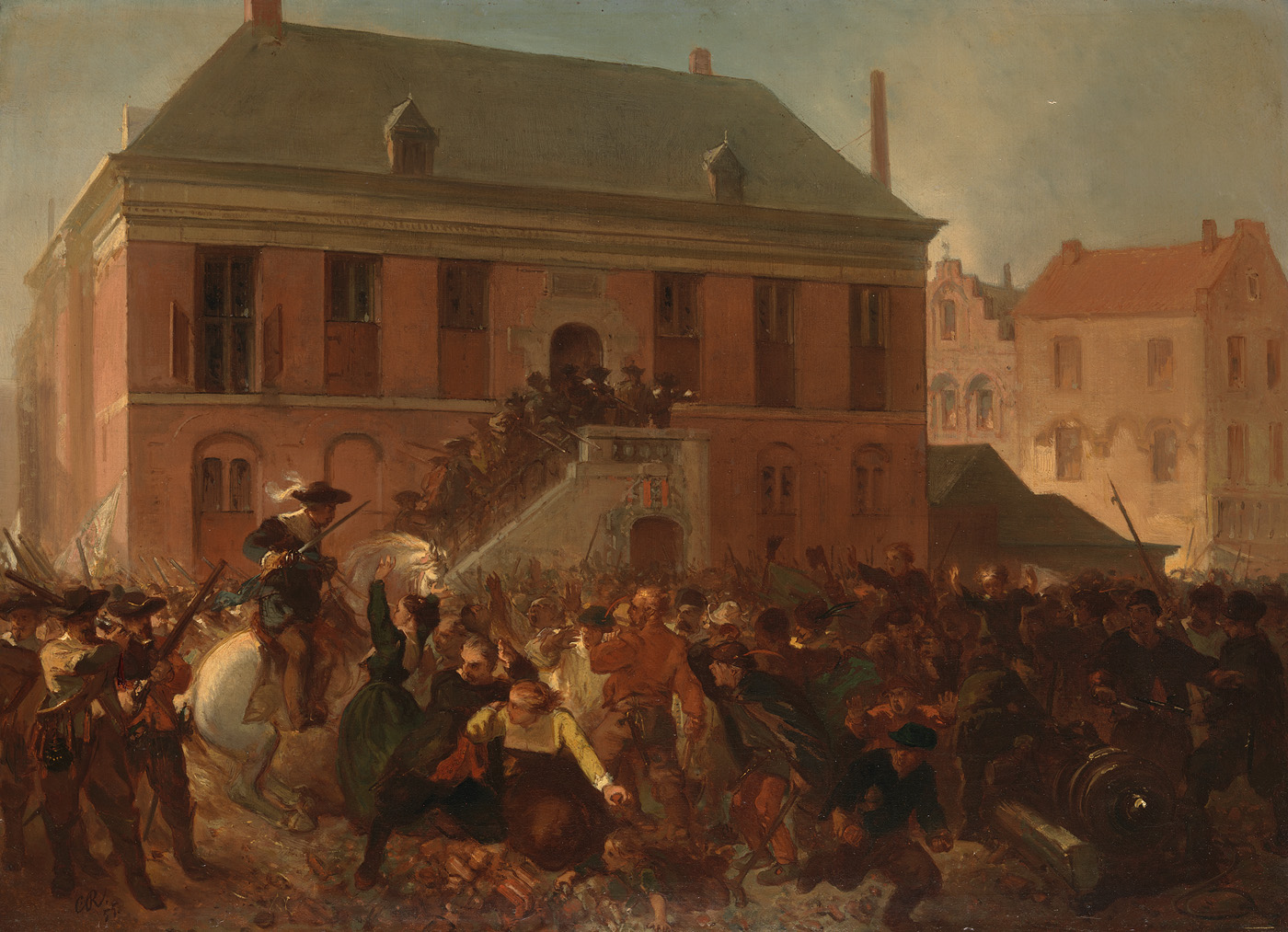
Sailors who had captured the silver fleet, dissatisfied with their reward of only seventeen months' extra wages, tried to seize the loot and stormed the West India Company office in Amsterdam.

After the invasion of Portuguese Brazil by a WIC amphibious force in 1630, the extent of New Holland, as the colony was called, grew gradually, especially under its governor-general Johan Maurits of Nassau-Siegen, in the period 1637–44. It stretched from the Amazon river to Fort Maurits on the São Francisco River. Soon a large number of sugar plantations flourished in this area, enabling the company to dominate the European sugar trade. The colony was the base for conquests of Portuguese possessions in Africa also (due to the peculiarities of the trade winds that make it convenient to sail to Africa from Brazil in the Southern Hemisphere). Beginning in 1637 with the conquest of Portuguese Elmina Castle, the WIC gained control of the Gulf of Guinea area on the African coast, and with it of the hub of the slave trade to the Americas. In 1641, a WIC expedition sent from Brazil under command of Cornelis Jol conquered Portuguese Angola.

WIC control of Brazil started to unravel, however, when the Portuguese colonists in its territory started a spontaneous insurrection in 1645. By that time the official war with Portugal was over, as Portugal itself had risen against the Spanish crown in December 1640. The Republic soon concluded a ten-year truce with Portugal, but this was limited to Europe. The overseas war was not affected by it. By the end of 1645 the WIC had effectively lost control of north-east Brazil. There would be temporary reversals after 1648, when the Republic sent a naval expedition, but by then the Eighty Years' War was over.

In the Far East the VOC captured three of the six main Portuguese strongholds in Portuguese Ceylon in the period 1638–41, in alliance with the Kingdom of Kandy. In 1641 Portuguese Malacca was conquered. Again, the main conquests of Portuguese territory would follow after the end of the war.

The results of the VOC in the war against the Spanish possessions in the Far East were less impressive with the only success being the capture of a minor Spanish fort in the north of Formosa in 1642. The battles of Playa Honda in the Philippines in 1610, 1617 and 1624 resulted in defeats for the Dutch. An expedition in 1647 under Maarten Gerritsz de Vries equally ended in a number of defeats in the battles of Puerto de Cavite and La Naval de Manila. However, these expeditions were primarily intended to harass Spanish commerce with China and capture the annual Manila galleon, rather than to invade and conquer the Philippines.

== Endgame (1640–1648) ==
=== Peace party gaining ground ===
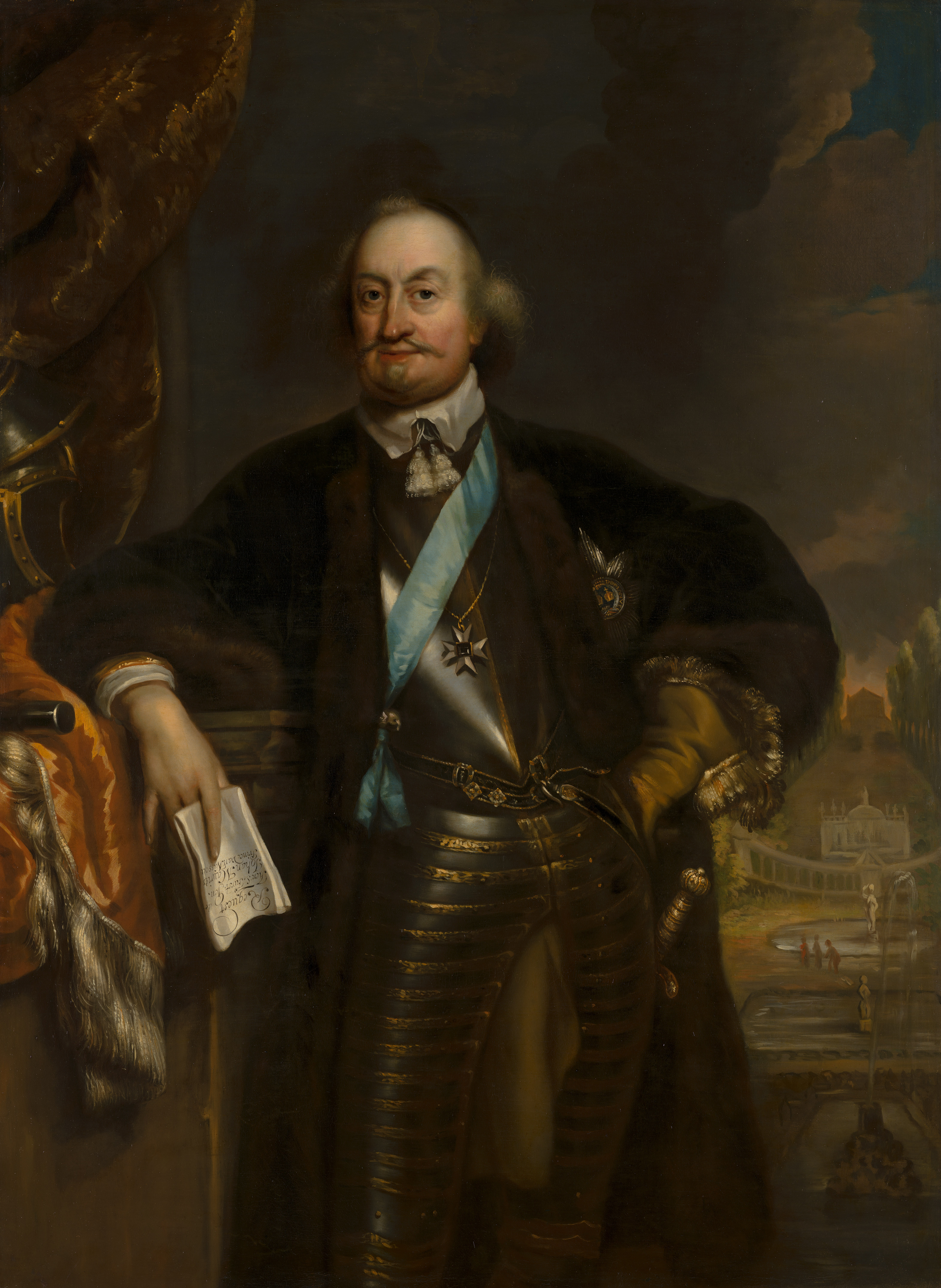
Johan Maurits van Nassau-Siegen by Jan de Baen

The revolts in Portugal and Catalonia, both in 1640, weakened Spain's position appreciably. Henceforth there would be increasing attempts by Spain to commence peace negotiations. These were initially rebuffed by the stadtholder, who did not wish to endanger the alliance with France. Cornelis Musch, as griffier of the States General, intercepted all correspondence the Brussels government attempted to send to the States on the subject (and was lavishly compensated for these efforts by the French). Frederick Henry also had an internal political motive to deflect the peace feelers, though. The regime, as it had been founded by Maurice after his coup in 1618, depended on the emasculation of Holland as a power center. As long as Holland was divided, the stadtholder reigned supreme. Frederick Henry also depended for his supremacy on a divided Holland. At first (up to 1633) he therefore supported the weaker moderates against the Counter-Remonstants in the States of Holland. When the moderates gained the upper hand after 1633, he shifted his stance to support of the Counter-Remonstrants and the war party. This policy of "divide and rule" enabled him to achieve a monarchical position in all but name in the Republic. He even strengthened it, when after the death of Hendrik Casimir, he deprived the latter's son William Frederick, Prince of Nassau-Dietz of the stadtholderates of Groningen and Drenthe in an unseemly intrigue. William Frederick only received the stadtholderate of Friesland, and Frederick Henry after 1640 was stadtholder in the other six provinces.

But this position was only secure as long as Holland remained divided. After 1640, opposition to the war more and more united the province. The reason, as often in the Republic's history, was money: the Holland regents were increasingly disinclined, in view of the diminished threat from Spain, to finance the huge military establishment the stadtholder had built up after 1629. This large army had, moreover, delivered diminishing returns: in 1641 only Gennep was captured. The next year Amsterdam succeeded in getting the army size reduced from over 70,000 to 60,000, over the stadtholder's objections.

=== Start of peace negotiations ===
The Holland regents continued their attempts at whittling down the stadtholder's influence by breaking up the system of secrete besognes in the States General. This helped wrest influence from the stadtholder's favourites, who dominated these committees. It was an important development in the context of the general peace negotiations which the main participants in the Thirty Years' War (France, Sweden, Spain, the Emperor, and the Republic) started in 1641 in Münster and Osnabrück. The drafting of the instructions for the Dutch delegation occasioned spirited debate and Holland made sure that she was not barred from their formulation. The Dutch demands that were eventually agreed upon were:

- cession by Spain of the entire Meierij district;
- recognition of Dutch conquests in the Indies (both East and West);
- permanent closure of the Scheldt to Antwerp commerce;
- tariff concessions in the Flemish ports; and
- lifting of the Spanish trade embargoes.

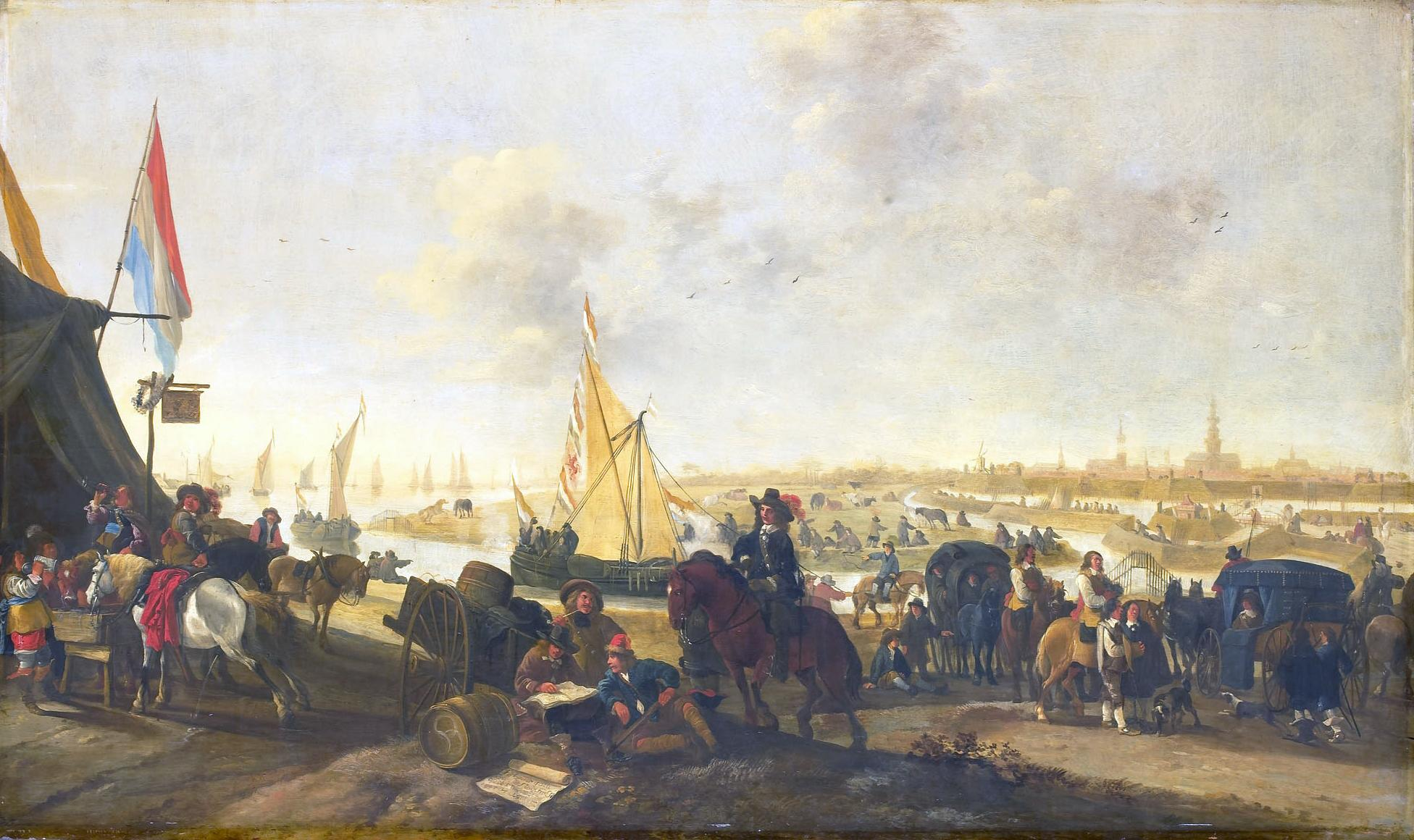
1645: The Siege of Hulst, the last major siege of the war

While the peace negotiations were progressing at a snail's pace, Frederick Henry managed a few final military successes: in 1644 he captured Sas van Gent and Hulst in what was to become States Flanders. In 1646, however, Holland, sick of the feet-dragging in the peace negotiations, refused to approve the annual war budget, unless progress was made in the negotiations. Frederick Henry now gave in and began to promote the peace progress, instead of frustrating it. Still, there was so much opposition from other quarters (such as the partisans of France in the States General, Zeeland, Frederick Henry's son William) that the peace could not be concluded before Frederick Henry's death on 14 March 1647.

=== Spain's disadvantage ===
Spain finally was forced to recognise the independence of the Dutch provinces, which had been among its most valuable possessions. While scholars propose numerous reasons for its defeat, the dominant argument is that Spain could no longer afford the expense of the conflict. Certainly, both Spain and the rebels spent considerable wealth to finance their campaigns, but the latter became increasingly stronger as the conflict progressed. Due to the Netherlands' booming economy, which was mainly driven by Dutch banks and a thriving stock market, the soldiers in the rebel armies got their pay on time. On the Spanish side, the situation was dismal. According to Nolan, the troops were usually owed months - if not years - of back pay and, "as a result, they fought with less enthusiasm and mutinied dozens of times during the eight decades of war." Also, Spanish mercenaries were spending their money in Flanders, not Spain. As a result, three million ducats were taken from the Spanish and added to the Dutch economy every year.

In 1647 Naples revolted against Spanish rule, further weakening the Spanish position.

=== Peace of Münster ===
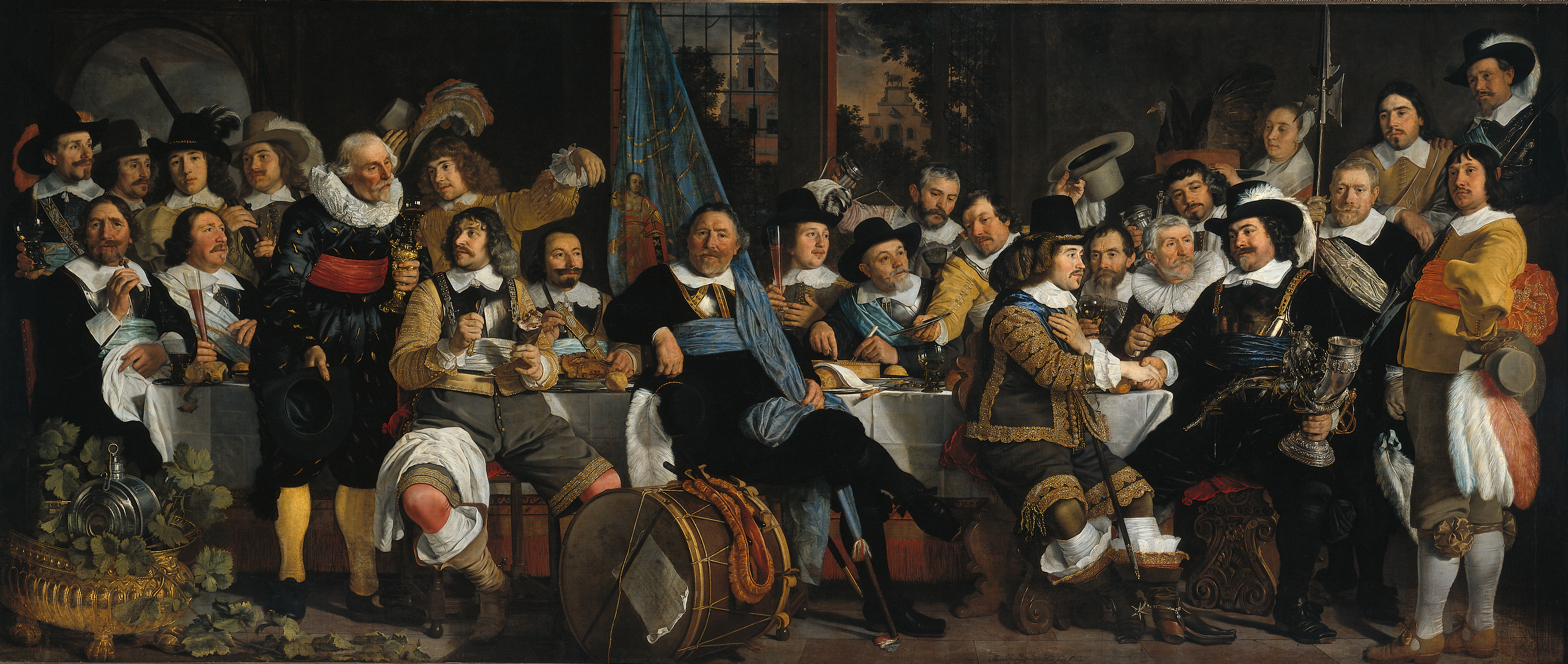
Amsterdam citizens celebrating the Peace of Münster, 1648 painting by Bartholomeus van der Helst

On 30 January 1648, the war ended with the Treaty of Münster between Spain and the Netherlands. In Münster on 15 May, the parties exchanged ratified copies of the treaty. This treaty was part of the European-scale Peace of Westphalia that also ended the Thirty Years' War. In the treaty, the power balance in Western Europe was readjusted to the actual geopolitical reality. This meant that the Dutch Republic was recognized de jure as an independent state, and that the longstanding separation of the Netherlands, as well as the Old Swiss Confederacy, from the Holy Roman Empire was finally legally recognized. The Republic retained control over the territories that were conquered in the later stages of the war. In many ways, this was the unexpected and unplanned outcome of a complex set of simultaneous developments across decades. The Dutch Republic, now recognised as such, no longer consisted of the provinces and cities that from 1579 onwards had originally concluded the Union of Utrecht: southern cities signing the Union such as Antwerp, Ghent, Bruges, Ypres, Mechelen and Lier had all been reconquered by Alexander Farnese, Duke of Parma in the 1580s. Rennenberg's 1580 defection also necessitated the rebel Union to re-secure the provinces of Friesland, Drenthe, Overijssel, and especially Groningen from 1580 to 1594. Despite losing several members throughout the war, the remaining Union signatories managed to persevere. The 1579 Union of Utrecht had also pledged loyalty to Philip II, then the 1581 Act of Abjuration renounced him and vowed to replace him with a different monarch, and yet, the rebel States-General resolved to become a republic in 1588. Each province was now governed by its sovereign States, executive boards with multiple members that had already existed prior to the war as mostly advisory councils, but now took on a governing role, unprecedented in Europe at the time. The borderlands conquered by the States Army in the final stages of the war, consisting of parts of Flanders, Brabant, Upper Guelders, and the Lands of Overmaas, became the so-called Generality Lands (Generaliteitslanden), as they were to be governed directly by the States-General. In terms of religion, a unique balance had arisen, whereby all inhabitants of the Republic were accorded freedom of conscience, but only members of the Calvinist Dutch Reformed Church – the publicly privileged church, although never officially becoming a "state church" – could practice their religion openly. Private practice of other religions and denominations was tolerated, though non-Calvinists still faced discrimination and were excluded from public office.

== Aftermath ==
The French and Dutch had originally agreed to join forces in negotiating with Spain. (Note: In 1635, the Dutch States-General and France had agreed: 'Rien ne sera conclué entre la France et l'Espagne, si en mesme temps le Traité d'entre l'Espagne et Messieurs les Estats n'est aussij conclud.' ("Nothing will be concluded between France and Spain, if not the Treaty between Spain and the Lords States is concluded at the same time.")) While the willing Dutch and Spanish had been able to establish the text of their peace treaty by January 1648, the French and Spanish still could not reach any agreements, and the French were trying to withhold their Dutch allies from sealing the deal; the Republic's annoyed negotiators felt the "selfish" French were stalling for time to gain more Spanish concessions over the back of the Dutch. (Note: 'Toen de Fransen "versochten, indien Spagnien sich met haer [de Fransen] niet wilde accomoderen, dat wij [de Nederlanders] ons tractaet niet souden voltrecken" – toen was het zonneklaar. Frankrijk wilde meer winst behalen en trachtte het Staatse belang aan zijn zelfzucht ondergeschikt te maken: dat was 'tergiverseren', opzettelijk dwarsbomen.' ("When the French 'requested, in case Spain would not accommodate to them [the French], that we [the Dutch] would not conclude our treaty' – it was obvious. France was trying to make more profit and attempted to submit the States' interest to its own selfishness: that was "tergiverseren", deliberate obstruction.")) The Dutch decided to conclude a separate peace with Spain on 30 January 1648, confirmed on 15 May 1648, while there was still no sign of Franco–Spanish rapprochement. Indeed, the Franco-Spanish War would continue for eleven more years, until the Treaty of the Pyrenees was finally signed in 1659.

Portugal was not party to the 1648 Peace of Münster, and the overseas Dutch–Portuguese War (1602–1663) resumed fiercely after the expiration of the ten-year truce of 1640. In Brazil and Africa the Portuguese managed to reconquer most of the territory lost to the WIC in the early 1640s after a long struggle. However, this occasioned a short war in Europe in the years 1657–60, during which the VOC completed its conquests in Ceylon and the coastal areas of the Indian subcontinent. Portugal was forced to indemnify the WIC for its losses in Brazil.

The chaotic and dramatic early decades of the Eighty Years' War, which were filled with civil revolts and large-scale urban massacres, largely ended for the provinces north of the Great Rivers after they proclaimed the Republic in 1588, expelled the Spanish forces and established peace, safety and prosperity for their population. However, the countryside of Brabant, Flanders and the lands constituting the modern two provinces of Belgian and Dutch Limburg continued to be devastated by decades of regular warfare, with armies forcing farmers to hand over their food, or destroying their crops to deny food to the enemy. Both parties levied taxes on farmers in the still-contested environs of 's-Hertogenbosch after the Dutch conquered it in 1629. Towns such as Helmond, Eindhoven and Oisterwijk were repeatedly subjected to pillaging, arson, and sexual violence committed by both rebel and royal forces.

The upper and middle classes of the Republic, especially in the provinces of Holland, Zeeland and Utrecht, prospered during this time and experienced the so-called Dutch Golden Age, with a relatively high quality of life on average. However, wealth and health were rather unequally distributed across social classes, with lower classes in Hollandic cities being worse off than the newly established regenten class; similarly, the majority of eastern provinces' population consisted of poor farmers ruled over by traditional nobility, and in the south, where the Generality Lands did not have political representation in the States-General, the predominantly Catholic population was tolerated but discriminated against, and also largely consisted of relatively poor farmers.

== Bibliography ==
- Glete, J. (2002). War and the State in Early Modern Europe. Spain, the Dutch Republic and Sweden as Fiscal-Military States, 1500–1660. Routledge. ISBN 0-415-22645-7.
- Groenveld, Simon (2009). Unie – Bestand – Vrede. Drie fundamentele wetten van de Republiek der Verenigde Nederlanden. Hilversum: Uitgeverij Verloren. p. 200. ISBN 978-9087041274. (in cooperation with H.L.Ph. Leeuwenberg and H.B. van der Weel)
- Groenveld, Simon; Leeuwenberg, Huib (2020). De Tachtigjarige Oorlog. Opstand en consolidatie in de Nederlanden (ca. 1560–1650). Derde editie (in Dutch). Zutphen: Walburg Pers. p. 750. ISBN 978-9462495661. (e-book; original publication 2008; in cooperation with M. Mout and W. Zappey)
- Lesaffer, Randall (2006). "Siege Warfare and the Early Modern Laws of War". Ius Brabanticum, ius commune, ius gentium (PDF). pp. 87–109.
- Mulder, Liek; Doedens, Anne; Kortlever, Yolande (2008). Geschiedenis van Nederland, van prehistorie tot heden. Baarn: HBuitgevers. p. 288. ISBN 978-9055746262.
- Israel, Jonathan (1989). Dutch Primacy in World Trade, 1585–1740. Clarendon Press. ISBN 0-19-821139-2.
- Israel, Jonathan (1990). Empires and Entrepôts: The Dutch, the Spanish Monarchy, and the Jews, 1585–1713. Continuum International Publishing Group. ISBN 1-85285-022-1.
- Israel, Jonathan (1995). The Dutch Republic: Its Rise, Greatness, and Fall 1477–1806. Oxford: Clarendon Press. ISBN 0-19-873072-1.
- Goslinga, Cornelis Ch. (2012) [First published 1979]. A Short History of the Netherlands Antilles and Surinam. Springer Dordrecht. pp. 26–27. doi:10.1007/978-94-009-9289-4. ISBN 978-94-009-9289-4.
