= Cornelis Musch =

Cornelis Musch (Rotterdam, 1592 or 1593 – The Hague, 15 December 1650) was Griffier (Chief Clerk) of the States-General of the Netherlands, the governing body of the Dutch Republic, from 1628 till the start of the First Stadtholderless Period. He was a byword for corruption in his lifetime.

== Biography ==
=== Family life ===
Cornelis Musch was the son of Jan Jacobsz. Musch, a rich Rotterdam herring merchant, and Maritge Cornelisd. Matelieff, a merchant of fishing tackle, and so rich in her own right that she was able to buy the Heerlijkheid of Waalsdorp. Lord of Waalsdorp was therefore the first aristocratic title Musch was able to use (1635). He later also acquired other lordships: Nieuwveen (1648), Carnisse (1649) and Opvelt and Muylstede (1650).

He married Elisabeth Cats, a daughter of Grand Pensionary Jacob Cats on 9 June 1636 when he was 44 and she 17. They had several daughters who married well. One was Elisabeth Maria who married the unlucky Henri de Fleury de Coulan, better known as "captain Buat", who would lose his head in a treason affair, which bears his name. Her sister Maria Elisabeth married Matthijs Pompe, lord of Slingelandt, a prominent Dordrecht Regent. A third daughter, Anna Catharina, married Carel van den Boetzelaer, also a prominent Regent.

=== Career ===
After studying at the Rotterdam Latin school and Leiden University (1612), he rounded off his studies with a law degree from the University of Orléans in 1617. In the sequel of the coup d'état by stadtholder Maurice, Prince of Orange in 1618, which brought about the fall of Johan van Oldenbarnevelt, he enjoyed the patronage of Francis van Aarssens (one of the main enemies of Oldenbarnevelt). He became Advocat of the States-General, to fill a vacancy after the purge of the Oldenbarnevelt adherents. Equally, after the purge of the Rotterdam vroedschap, he was appointed griffier (secretary) of that city in 1619.

In 1628 he was appointed griffier of the States-General in the same resolution which appointed his predecessor Johan van Goch thesaurier-generaal (treasurer) of the Union (April 27). Later historians complain about his longhand, which is far less legible than that of Van Goch. This makes the study of the registers of the States-General unduly onerous for the years in which Musch was chief clerk.

Besides this important office on the federal level, he also acquired offices on the local level, like hoogheemraad (a member of the governing body) of the polder Delfland (1643) and groot baljuw of Het Vrije van Staats Vlaanderen (an area in present-day Zeelandic Flanders; 1645).

As the salaried official of the States-General Musch was soon able to build an informal position of power. The presidency of the States-General rotated weekly, so that presidents hardly had time to get acquainted with affairs before they were already replaced. They tended to lean heavily on the Griffier. Also, in this period the Grand Pensionaries of Holland (who would normally perform a leading role in the affairs of the States-General) were selected for their incompetence and weakness, to protect the power position of the Stadtholder Frederick Henry, Prince of Orange. On the other hand, Musch became a favorite of Frederick Henry, and helped him manage the States-General.

Musch also made himself useful to foreign diplomats. King Louis XIII acknowledged this when he created Musch an écuyer (squire) in September 1632, on the recommendation of Cardinal Richelieu, for services rendered to French diplomacy (i.e. the Dutch government had no secrets for the French one, thanks to Musch). When the Franco-Dutch alliance was renewed in 1636 all members of the commission of the States-General who negotiated the treaty received liberal gratuities from the French Crown, but Musch received the largest: 20,000 livres.

Besides state secrets, almost anything was for sale, as far as Musch was concerned. He was accused of altering the resolutions of the States-General that he was supposed to enter in the register, presumably for a consideration. He also played a central role in the patronage system of the Republic. Offices and other favors could be obtained from the stadtholder and the States-General if Musch received the required consideration.

Such practices would be considered "corrupt" nowadays. In those days, however, they might be considered reasonable perks of the office, as long as they remained within certain bounds. By common consent, Musch went beyond those bounds, but because he was such an important part of the Orangist regime under Frederick Henry and his son and successor William II, Prince of Orange, Musch managed to get away with it to almost the end of his life.

However, he was known to have played an important role during the coup d'état of William II against the Holland Regents in August 1650. When William suddenly died in October, Musch was exposed to the wrath of the newly resurgent Regents, who decided to make an example of him. He was made the subject of an investigation into the coup, and of his corrupt practices. This may have convinced him to take his own life on 15 December (though the exact circumstances of his death are unclear). His motivation would have been that a conviction would have brought confiscation of his fortune, which amounted to an estimated 2,000,000 guilders at his death. Thus, he protected his heirs.

After his death Joost van den Vondel wrote the following satirical epitaph:

Grafschrift, Op Een Musch
Hier leit de Hofmusch nu en rot,
Zij broeide slangen in haar pot;
Lijcesters en Duc d'Alb's gebroed:
Zij scheet de vrijheid op de hoed,
De schoonste Steden op het hoofd,
Zij schon en at al 't lekker ooft;
Zij pikten, zonder schrik of schroom,
De schoonste kerssen op den boom;
Zij vroeg na kluit-boog, klap, noch knip;
Zij kon den Moolek op een stip;
Zij vloog de Meester van de hand,
En speelde met de macht van 't Land;
Zij bersten aan een Spinnekop,
Dewijl zij dronk, en sprak; Dit sop
Bekomt mij zeker niet te wel;
De rest geeft Aarssen en Kapel.

which amounts to an elaborate play on Musch' name (English: Sparrow) and how sparrows spoil food and dump on people's heads, while alluding to the fact that important Orangists like Van Aarsens profited from his corrupt practices.

== Sources ==
- (in Dutch) Japikse, N. (1907) "Cornelis Musch en de corruptie van zijn tijd", in: De Gids, vol. 71, p. 501
- (in Dutch) Knevel, P. (2001) Het Haagse bureau; zeventiende-eeuwse ambtenaren tussen staatsbelang en eigenbelang, Prometheus/Bakker ISBN 90-5333-884-5, pp. 123–144

Preceded by Johan van Goch	Griffier of the States-General of the Netherlands; 1628–1650	Succeeded by Nicolaas Ruysch
