= Dutch raid on North America =

Dutch Naval Campaign against English and French colonial possessions in North America

- Part of the Franco-Dutch War and the Third Anglo-Dutch War
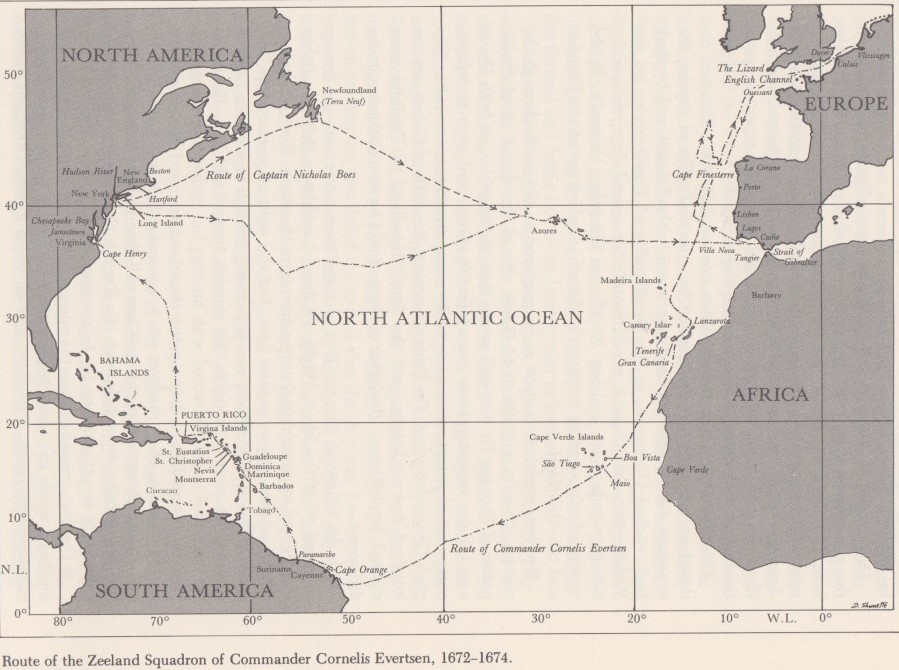
- The Route of the Dutch Naval Campaign of 1672-1674.
| Date | December 1672 to February 1674 |
| Location | Caribbean and North America |
| Result | Dutch victory |

Belligerents
| Dutch Republic; Zeeland; Holland | England; France |

Commanders and leaders
| (Dutch Republic) Cornelis Evertsen the Youngest (Dutch Republic) Anthony Colve (Dutch Republic) Jacob Binckes | (Kingdom of England) Richard Munden (Kingdom of England) John Manning (surrendered) |

Strength
| Initially 6 vessels (115 guns) and 586 men | Munden's Squadron; 4 warships (174–184 guns); 2 fireships |

Casualties and losses
| | 200 vessels captured or destroyed |

The Dutch raid on North America (Note: Also Dutch raid on America, or Dutch naval campaign of 1672-1674) took place from December 1672 to February 1674 during the Third Anglo-Dutch War, a related conflict of the Franco-Dutch War. A naval expedition led by Cornelis Evertsen the Youngest and Jacob Binckes attacked English and French possessions in North America.

Evertsen originally planned to attack the homeward-bound convoy of the English East India Company, but abandoned the idea when his ships were intercepted by a superior Royal Navy squadron off Cape Verde. After linking up with Binckes, their combined force instead attacked the Americas intending to inflict as much damage as possible.

Although they recaptured the former Dutch colony of New Netherland, it was returned to England under the terms of the Treaty of Westminster (1674). The raid marks the end of direct Dutch influence in colonial North America.

== Background ==
Commercial conflicts between England and the Dutch Republic resulted in the 1652 to 1654 First Anglo-Dutch War and 1665 to 1667 Second Anglo-Dutch War, but tensions between the two countries significantly diminished after 1667. Both were concerned by French expansion under Louis XIV, while exchanging the Dutch colony of New Amsterdam for the spice island of Run resolved a major area of dispute. Despite this, in the 1670 Secret Treaty of Dover, Charles II of England agreed to support an attack by Louis on the Dutch and initiated the Third Anglo-Dutch War in April 1672.

When France invaded the Dutch Republic in May 1672, it initially seemed as if Louis had won an overwhelming victory. By the end of June, only the Dutch Waterline stood between them and the core province of Holland; by opening the sluices, the Dutch managed to stop the French advance. Dutch survival depended on control of the sea lanes, which ensured they could bring in vital supplies and keep trade routes open. On 7 June 1672, a Dutch naval force attacked the combined Anglo-French fleet at the Battle of Solebay; both sides lost one ship each, but it ended significant naval operations for the year. The battle thus prevented the allies from landing their troops on the Dutch coast.

His unexpected success proved a mixed blessing for Louis, since the possibility of France controlling the Republic, the largest commercial power in Europe, brought the Dutch support from Emperor Leopold and Spain among others and increased opposition to the war in England, where many had opposed an alliance with Catholic France from the start. Peace talks stalled after an over-confident Louis made demands unacceptable even to his English allies. Meanwhile his German ally, the Bishop of Münster, besieged Groningen, but was unsuccessful in this endeavor and retreated with heavy casualties.

By the Fall of 1672 however, the province of Zeeland, like Holland and the rest of the United Provinces, was approaching the brink of economic collapse. Taxation was able to meet only a portion of the States of Zeeland's military expenditures and the coming year was certain to be worse. By late Fall it had become obvious to Grand Pensionary Pieter de Huybert and his nephew Clerk of the States of Zeeland Justus de Huybert that a massive infusion of revenue was needed to keep their own States afloat in the upcoming year. During this period the idea was conceived to intercept the richly laden homeward-bound ships of the English East India Company, or if that failed to conduct a swift commerce raiding foray against the French and English enemy's colonies in the Americas. In the weeks that followed the passage of this resolution the Admiralty of Zeeland proceeded to prepare for the expedition in secrecy. They chose the experienced and capable Cornelis Evertsen the Youngest to lead the fleet composed of 6 ships and 586 sailors, militia and marines.

== Campaign ==
=== Atlantic ===
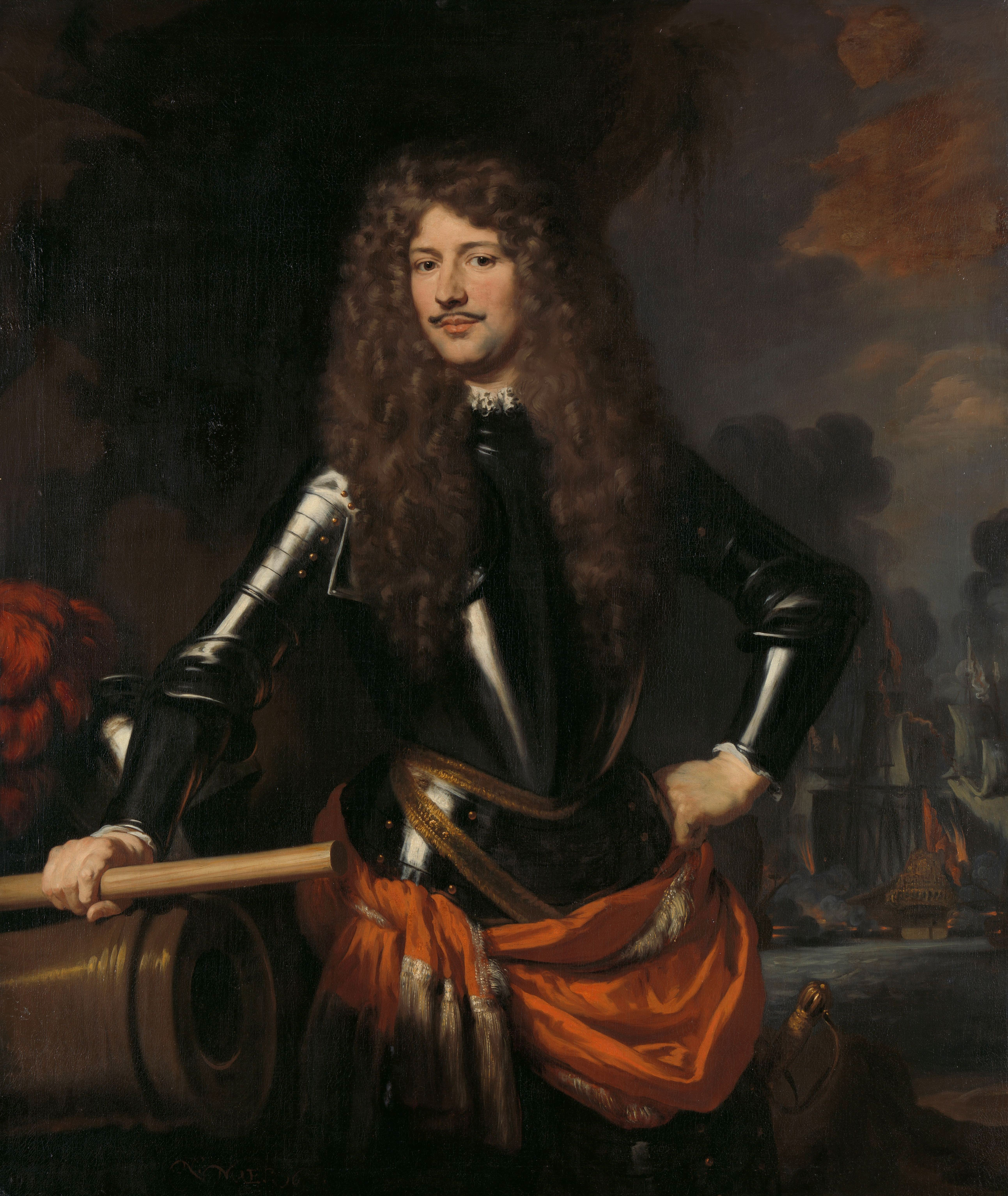
Portrait of Cornelis Evertsen, by Nicolaes Maes

On 30 November 1672, the Zeeland squadron departed from Vlissingen. Evertsen exercised caution as he prepared to slip south through the narrow, 20 mile wide Strait of Dover, one of the classic naval choke points of Europe. The next day, after an encounter with only one English warship, Evertsen entered the Atlantic Ocean. There the squadron encountered a few English ships some of whom were taken as prizes. After experiencing some bad weather, Evertsen finally reached his first objective on 14 January: the Canary Islands. There he revictualled and left for the Portuguese Cape Verde Islands. On 8 February, while revictualling and at anchor in Santiago Bay with only three out of his six ships, he was surprised and attacked by a superior English fleet under Richard Munden, who ironically was there to intercept a homeward-bound fleet of the VOC. The Dutch slipped their anchors as fast as they could and threw everything possible overboard. This allowed their ships to outsail the English squadron. The Dutch squadron thus escaped due to Evertsen's fast thinking and the remarkable seamanship of his crew. His ships were nevertheless still blockaded in the bay. The following day Munden invited Evertsen to surrender since his situation seemed hopeless, and threatened that the English would otherwise launch a fire ship to burn them out. Evertsen responded that he and his crew "were resolved to defend our ships to the last man, and that they could do whatever they thought best." Evertsen was however again able to outsail the English squadron and successfully brought his ships out of the bay to safety. After this narrow escape Evertsen realised that his principal objective was no longer attainable. Returning to the Netherlands without having achieved anything would, however, not go over well with the Admiralty and likely result in his dismissal. For this reason Evertsen decided to sail for America.

=== Caribbean ===
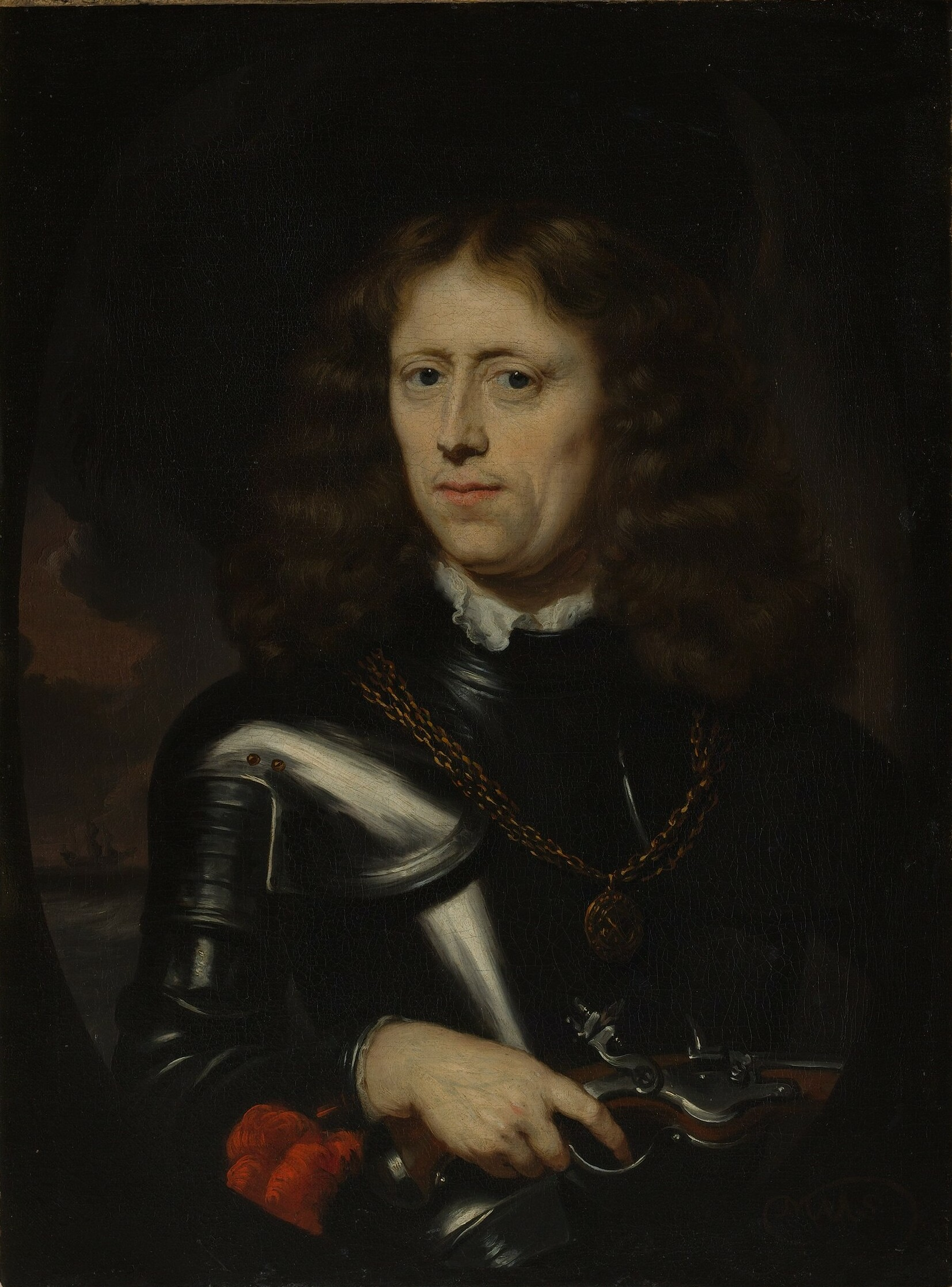
Portrait of Jacob Binckes, by Nicolaes Maes

Evertsen first sailed for The Guianas. He was thinking about capturing the French colony of Cayenne, but decided against it after reconnoitering the area. He then sailed for Suriname, which by then was already in Dutch hands. Thereafter Evertsen set sail for the French colony of Martinique. While sailing around Martinique he met by coincidence another Dutch squadron, of six ships from the Admiralty of Amsterdam, under Jacob Binckes. Binckes who had arrived earlier, had been sent out in December, with orders to escort Spanish treasure ships from the Azores to Cádiz and afterward to sail to the West Indies to prey on English and French colonies and their trade, had already captured a number of French ships. They decided to join forces, agreeing to alternate command weekly and to attack both English and French colonies. Their first target was the French colony of Guadeloupe.

When they first arrived they were immediately attacked by two French armed merchantmen who were soundly beaten. After they laid siege to Guadeloupe, they captured another five armed merchantmen. They then tried to take Nevis, but failed due to bad communication. They decided to continue to the Leeward Islands, where Saint Kitts was next. On 28 May they arrived off its west coast, and harassed, and captured the ships anchored there. The former Dutch colony of Sint Eustatius was close. It had been captured by the English not long before and Evertsen was interested in a possible recapture. On 29 May they arrived and after a short battle the English garrison surrendered, and the island and neighbouring Saba were captured. The Dutch squadron remained there for a while, capturing prizes, and expropriating the local African slaves as punishment for the disloyal behavior of the local Dutch settlers, but they eventually set sail for the neutral island of Spanish Puerto Rico where they planned to sell slaves they had captured from the English. They arrived at San Juan, where, however the Spanish governor proved uncooperative and kept delaying, refusing permission for revictualling and watering. At San Juan the Dutch commanders thought about their next move. They decided that it would be too difficult to sell the slaves profitably at San Juan. They used two English and French prizes with Dutch prize crews to transport and sell the slaves in Suriname, at Fort Zeelandia (Paramaribo). After the prizes returned from Paramaribo the commanders decided on the next objective, which would be English North America.

=== Virginia ===
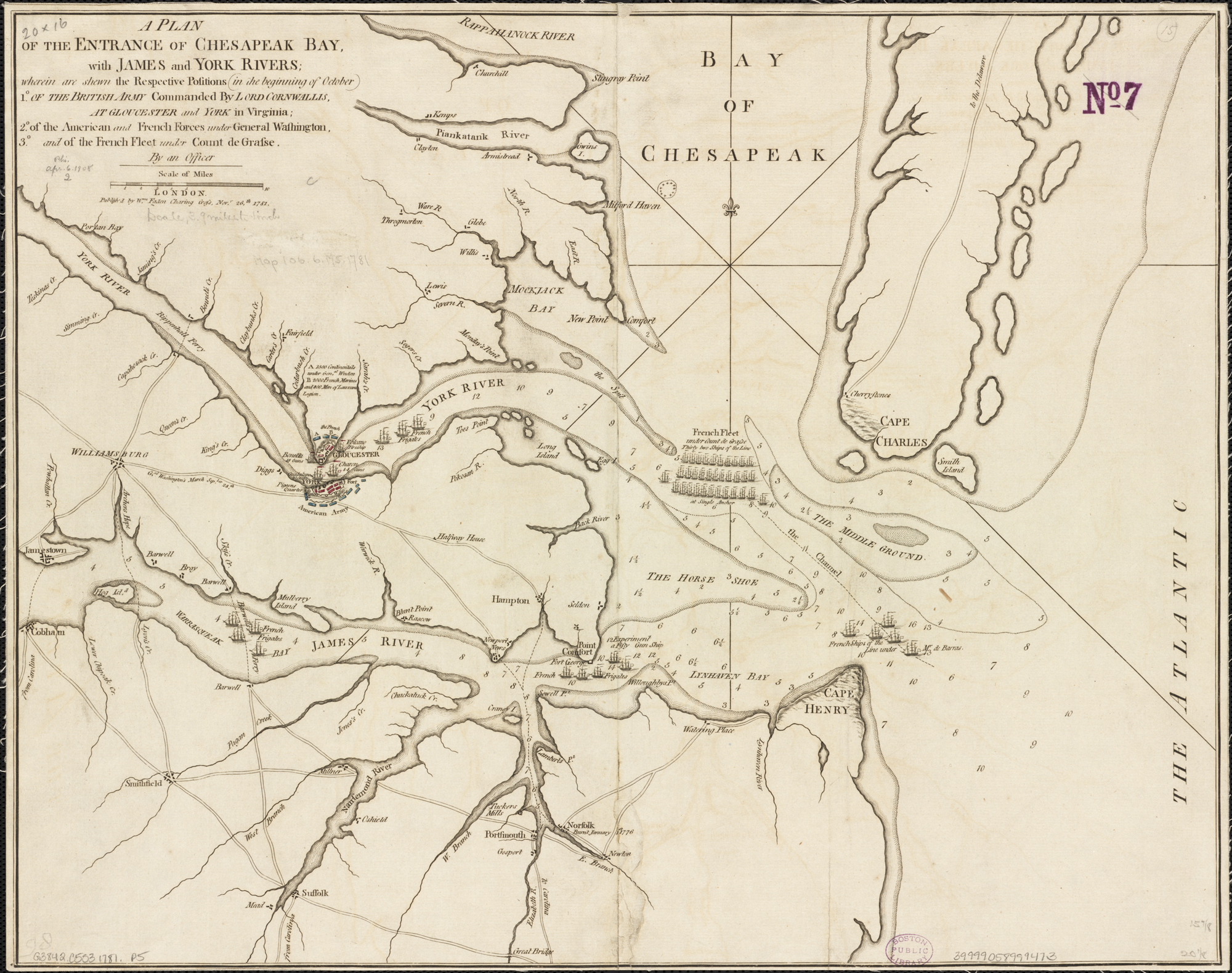
Map of the battle area (Note: The Sea Horse shoal is prominent in the center of the map. The Dutch fleet was originally anchored just west of Cape Henry)

It was decided they would set sail for the English colony of Virginia. While the Dutch were on their way governor William Berkeley of the colony was informed of a possible Dutch raid, which had happened before during the Second Anglo-Dutch War by the naval expedition of Abraham Crijnssen. At this time Virginia was not well defended and fortifications were insufficient. The people of the colony were panicking. They were doing their best to reinforce the forts and raise more troops. Meanwhile the annual departure of the Maryland and Virginia tobacco fleets for England was approaching. The capture of these ships was the main objective of the Dutch, like it had been in 1667. The Royal Navy had sent two 50 gun frigates, the HMS Barnaby and the HMS Augustine, to protect the combined convoy.

The Dutch squadron arrived on 10 July (O.S.) They anchored in the Lynnhaven Roads, just west of Cape Henry. The English commanders Thomas Gardiner and Edward Cotterell decided to play a waiting game, but they were forced to act when on 12 July the Maryland tobacco ships suddenly appeared coming down the Chesapeake Bay and unsuspectingly sailing straight at the waiting Dutch. The English warships therefore engaged the Dutch fleet and succeeded in their attempt to lure the Dutch warships away, but the odds were against them and at the end of the day the Dutch prevailed. In the next few days the Dutch captured a number of ships (some of them stranded English merchantmen, which they burned), but due to the many shoals in the Hampton Roads and adjacent rivers, where the tobacco fleet had taken refuge, were unable to capture the majority of the English ships. They decided to retreat since they thought their mission was accomplished. They had captured thousands of hogsheads of tobacco, and driven both the Virginia, and Maryland tobacco fleets in hiding to Jamestown, at a small cost to themselves.

== New Netherlands ==
In the days after the battle the Dutch fleet captured a small English ship. One of the captured Englishmen told Evertsen all about the situation in New York. He informed him that the defenses of Fort James were weak and that governor Francis Lovelace was absent. Evertsen and Binckes then decided to grasp the opportunity to recapture the former New Amsterdam and New Netherland from the English. They then set sail for New York. On 25 July (O.S.) they passed Cape Henlopen. On 30 July (O.S.) (8 August N.S.) they anchored near Staten Island. When they arrived a number of Dutch colonists came aboard and complained about the English occupation. These Dutchmen were tired of the harsh English rule. They confirmed that governor Lovelace was absent and that the fort was weakly guarded. After a Council of War the two Dutch commanders decided to issue a proclamation in which they told the inhabitants of New York that they had nothing to fear from the Dutch if they were ready to submit to the States General of the Netherlands.

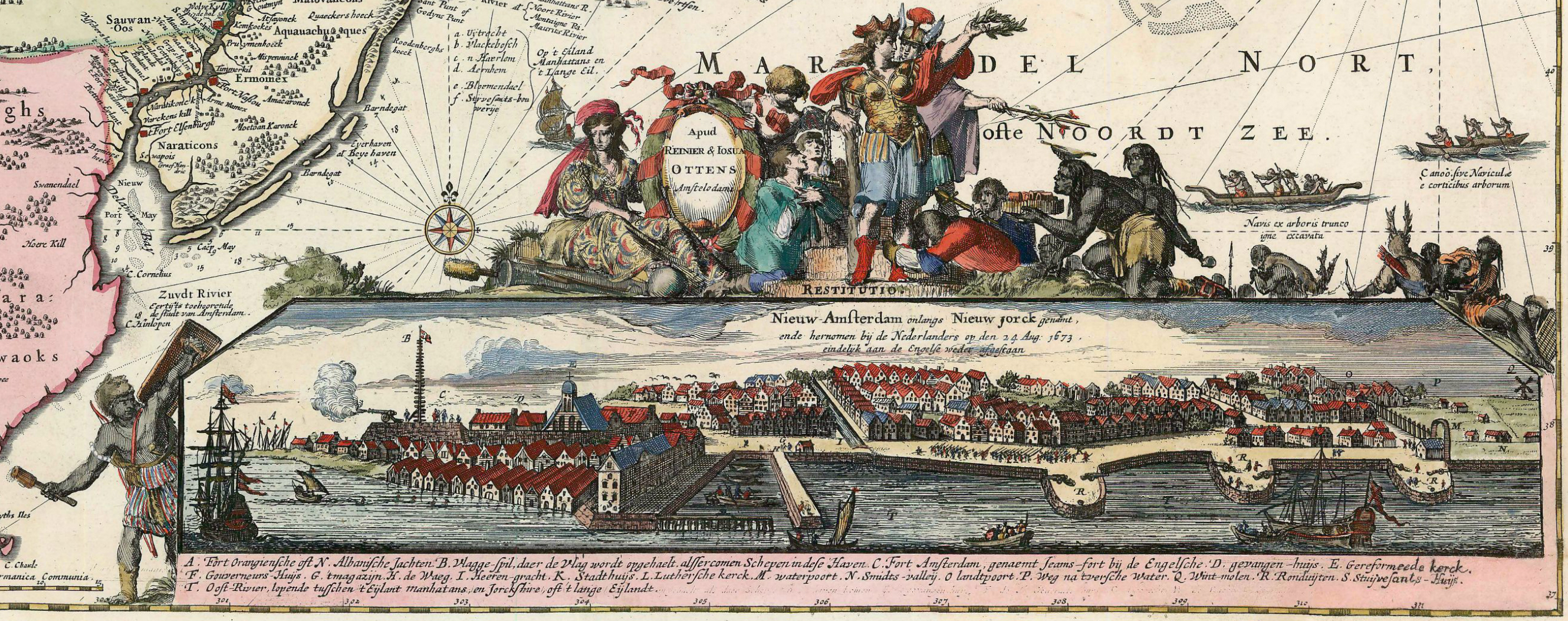
Map, entitled Totius Neobelgii Nova et Accuratissima Tabula (Note: A New and Accurate Map of the Whole of New Netherland.) by Hugo Allard commemorating the reconquest (Note: The date of 24 August 1673, given in the illustration is incorrect.)

The next morning (31 July (O.S.) / 9 August 1673 (N.S.)) the Dutch fleet set sail for Manhattan. They were met by a boat carrying parlimentaires representing the garrison commander of Fort James, captain John Manning. Evertsen and Binckes verbally issued an ultimatum, but the parlimentaires demanded to see their commission. According to Evertsen he "thought that very unreasonable, and I replied that it [the commission] was stuck in the muzzle of my gun, as they would find out if they did not surrender the fort." (Note: "my dacht dat seer onredelijck te sijn, gevende haar tot antwoort, dat die in de tromp van 't canon stack, gelijc sij wel haest souden gewaer worden, bij aldien het fort niet overleverden.")

While the Dutch ships anchored under the fort, but out of reach of its guns, there were several exchanges with Manning through Dutch and English parlimentaires. Manning remained reluctant, so the ships opened fire on the fort, which the English answered with their guns. A landing force of Dutch marines under the command of captain Anthony Colve was brought ashore and marched to the fort on the land side. Manning then ran up a white flag and asked to be allowed to surrender with the honors of war. This was granted and the Dutch troops entered the fort, after which the English garrison marched out and laid down its arms. They were made prisoners of war.

In October Evertsen and Binckes sent a fleet of four ships under Nicholas Boes to attack the entire fisheries fleet at Newfoundland. It was a great success which caused massive destruction.

== Aftermath ==
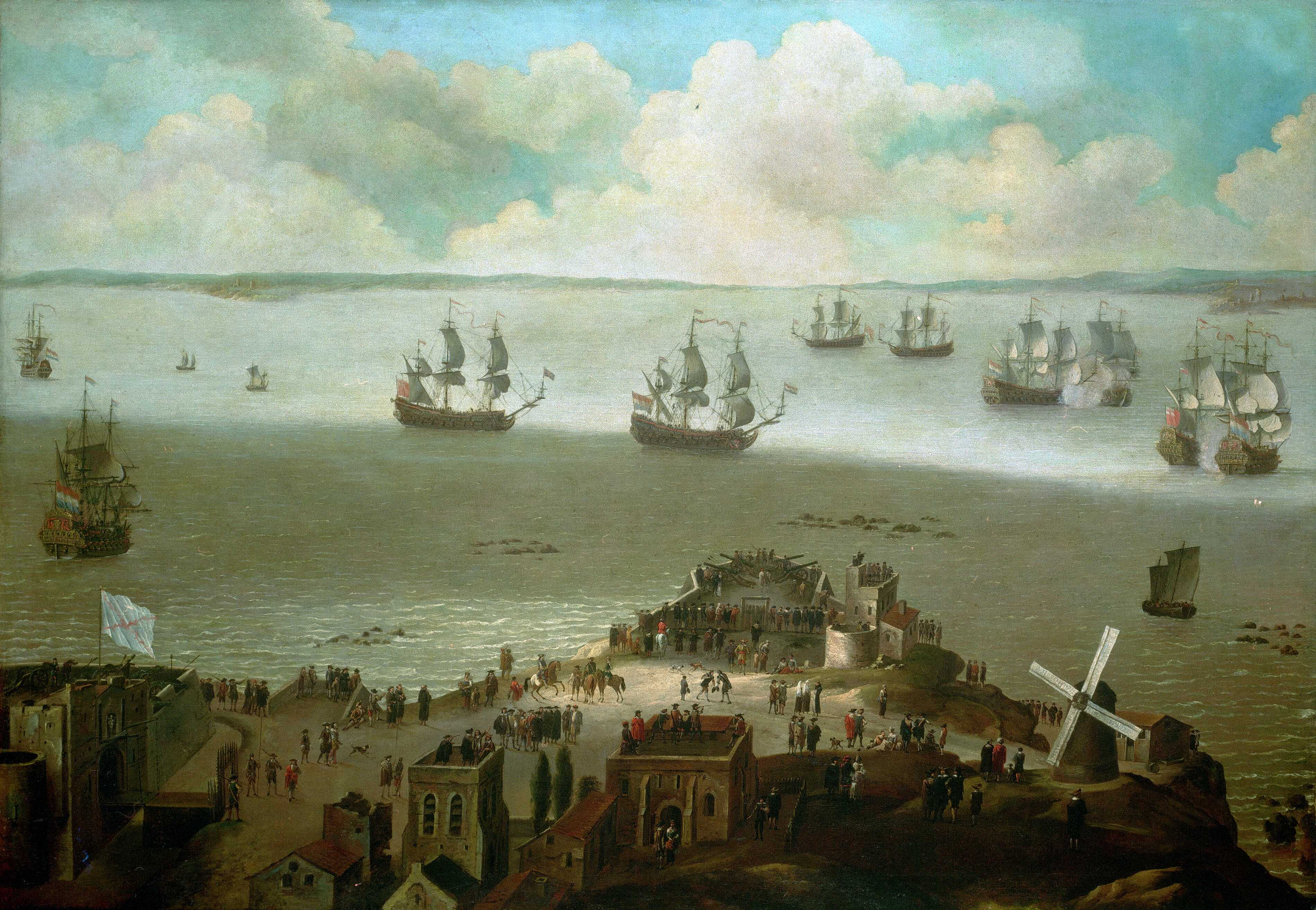
The battle between the HMS Tyger and the Schaeckerloo in the Harbour of Cádiz by Daniël Schellinks

Cornelis and Binckes departed from New Netherland in mid-September and arrived in the Azores on 27 October. During their journey, they encountered a significant storm, resulting in the loss of several ships. The remaining fleet reached Cádiz in December, requiring extensive repairs and refitting. While they were at this neutral harbor HMS Tyger (38) also entered and issued what the Dutch considered an insulting challenge. Evertsen pressured captain Passchier de Witte of the Schaeckerloo (28) to accept it, and this resulted in a single combat in the Cádiz roadstead between the two ships on 13 February 1674 (O.S.; 23 February 1674 (N.S.)). The Dutch failed to board the English ship and were severely battered in the gun battle. This resulted in very heavy Dutch losses, the wounding of captain De Witte, and the capture of the Dutch ship. This happened to be the last battle of the Third Anglo-Dutch War.

While at Cádiz, Evertsen received orders from his home country. Subsequently, on 23 June 1674, he returned to Vlissingen. Despite the efforts of Evertsen and Binckes, the Dutch rule over New Netherland was short-lived. In November 1674, the colony reverted to English control on the basis of the Treaty of Westminster (1674), serving as a bargaining chip in the peace process. This event marked the end of the Dutch empire's presence in North America.

== See also ==
- Raid on Newfoundland (1665)

== Sources ==
- Boxer, C. R. (1969). "Some Second Thoughts on the Third Anglo-Dutch War, 1672–1674". Trans. R. Hist. Soc. 19: 67–94. doi:10.2307/3678740. JSTOR 3678740. S2CID 159934682.
- Van Nimwegen, Olaf (2020). De Veertigjarige Oorlog 1672-1712: de strijd van de Nederlanders tegen de Zonnekoning (The 40 Years War 1672-1712: the Dutch struggle against the Sun King) (in Dutch). Prometheus. ISBN 978-90-446-3871-4.
- Van Nimwegen, Olaf (2010). The Dutch Army and the Military Revolutions, 1588–1688. Boydell Press. ISBN 978-1843835752.
- Shomette, Donald G.; Haslach, Robert D. (1988). Raid on America: The Dutch Naval campaign of 1672-1674. University of South Carolina Press. ISBN 978-0788422454.
- Panhuysen, Luc (2009). Rampjaar 1672: Hoe de Republiek aan de ondergang ontsnapte. Uitgeverij Atlas. ISBN 9789045013282.
- De Waard, Cornelis (1928). De Zeeuwsche expeditie naar de West onder Cornelis Evertsen den Jonge 1672-1674: Nieuw Nederland een jaar onder Nederlandsch Bestuur) (in Dutch). Linschoten-Vereeniging.
- Hattendorf, John B. “Competing Navies: Anglo-Dutch Naval Rivalry, 1652–88.” War, Trade and the State: Anglo-Dutch Conflict, 1652–89, edited by David Ormrod and Gijs Rommelse, NED-New edition, Boydell & Brewer, 2020, pp. 92–116. JSTOR, https://doi.org/10.2307/j.ctvrdf15m.11. Accessed 2 Feb. 2023. 650 vessels captured
- Rodger, N. A. M. (2004). The Command of the Ocean: A Naval History of Britain, 1649–1815. Penguin. ISBN 9780713994117.
- Pritchard, James (2004). In Search of Empire : The French in the Americas, 1670–1730. Cambridge University Press. ISBN 9780521827423.
