= 1667 =

1667 in various calendars
- Gregorian calendar: 1667; MDCLXVII
- Ab urbe condita: 2420
- Armenian calendar: 1116; ԹՎ ՌՃԺԶ
- Assyrian calendar: 6417
- Balinese saka calendar: 1588–1589
- Bengali calendar: 1073–1074
- Berber calendar: 2617
- English Regnal year: 18 Cha. 2 – 19 Cha. 2
- Buddhist calendar: 2211
- Burmese calendar: 1029
- Byzantine calendar: 7175–7176
- Chinese calendar: 丙午年 (Fire Horse); 4364 or 4157 — to — 丁未年 (Fire Goat); 4365 or 4158
- Coptic calendar: 1383–1384
- Discordian calendar: 2833
- Ethiopian calendar: 1659–1660
- Hebrew calendar: 5427–5428
- Hindu calendars
- Vikram Samvat: 1723–1724
- Shaka Samvat: 1588–1589
- Kali Yuga: 4767–4768
- Holocene calendar: 11667
- Igbo calendar: 667–668
- Iranian calendar: 1045–1046
- Islamic calendar: 1077–1078
- Japanese calendar: Kanbun 7 (寛文７年)
- Javanese calendar: 1589–1590
- Julian calendar: Gregorian minus 10 days
- Korean calendar: 4000
- Minguo calendar: 245 before ROC 民前245年
- Nanakshahi calendar: 199
- Thai solar calendar: 2209–2210
- Tibetan calendar: མེ་ཕོ་རྟ་ལོ་ (male Fire-Horse); 1793 or 1412 or 640 — to — མེ་མོ་ལུག་ལོ་ (female Fire-Sheep); 1794 or 1413 or 641

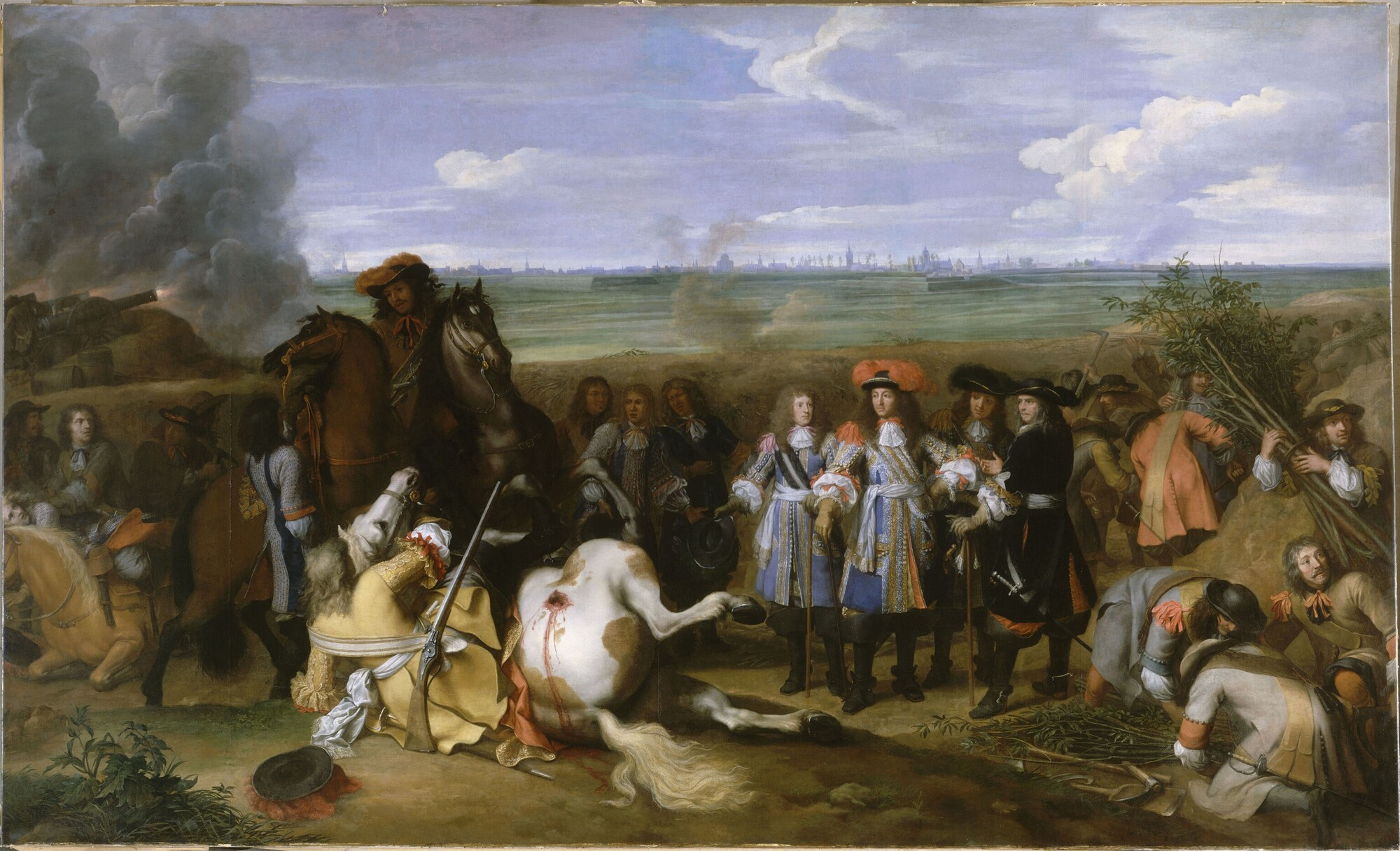
May 24: The War of Devolution begins after Spain's King Philip IV reneges on a promised dowry to France's King Louis XIV.

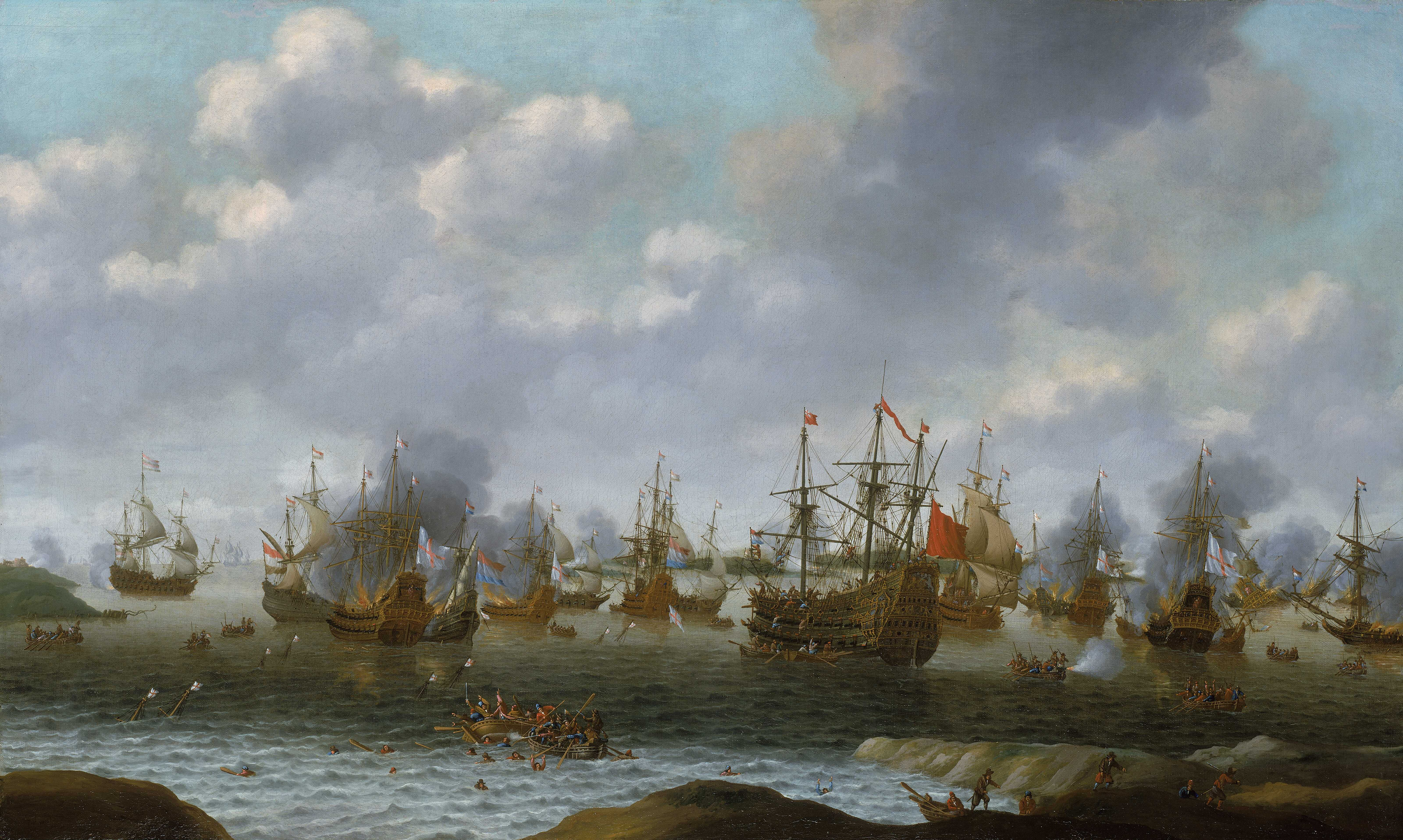
June 9–14: Raid on the Medway

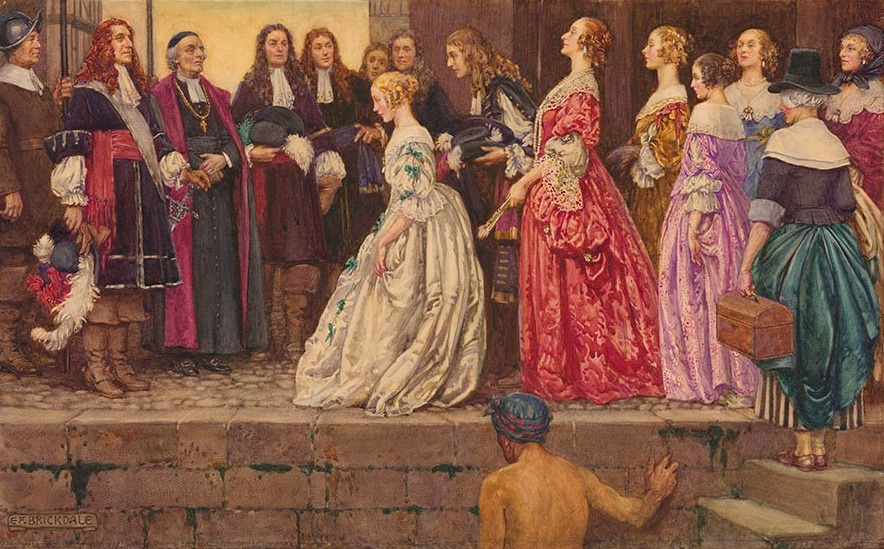
The King's Daughters arrive in New France.

1667 (MDCLXVII) was a common year starting on Saturday of the Gregorian calendar and a common year starting on Tuesday of the Julian calendar, the 1667th year of the Common Era (CE) and Anno Domini (AD) designations, the 667th year of the 2nd millennium, the 67th year of the 17th century, and the 8th year of the 1660s decade. As of the start of 1667, the Gregorian calendar was 10 days ahead of the Julian calendar, which remained in localized use until 1923.

== Events ==
=== January–March ===
- January 11 – Aurangzeb, monarch of the Mughal Empire, orders the removal of Rao Karan Singh as Maharaja of the Bikaner State (part of the modern-day Rajasthan state of India) because of Karan's dereliction of duty in battle.
- January 19 – The town of Anzonico in Switzerland is destroyed by an avalanche.
- January 27 – The 2,000 seat Opernhaus am Taschenberg, a theater in Dresden (capital of the Electorate of Saxony) opens with its first production, Pietro Ziani's opera Il teseo.
- February 5 – In the Second Anglo-Dutch War, the English Royal Navy warship HMS Saint Patrick is captured less than nine months after being launched, when it fights a battle off the coast of England and North Foreland, Kent. Captain Robert Saunders and 8 of his crew are killed while fighting the Dutch ships Delft and Shakerlo. The Dutch Navy renames the ship the Zwanenburg.
- February 6 (January 27 O.S.) – The Treaty of Andrusovo is signed during the Russo-Polish War. Poland cedes eastern Ukraine, including Kiev and Smolensk, to Russia, ending Poland's status as a major Central European power.
- February 8 – The first part of the Rebuilding of London Act 1666, following the destruction by the Great Fire of London of 1666, goes into effect as royal assent is given to the Fire of London Disputes Act 1666, which establishes the Fire Court. The Court, sitting at Clifford's Inn near Fleet Street, hears cases starting on February 27 and continuing until the end of 1668.
- February 22 – The Lejonkulan ("lion's den") opens at Stockholm in Sweden as the first permanent theater in Scandinavia, with the performance of Jean Magnon's Orontes en Satira.
- February 25 – During the Second Anglo-Dutch War, a Dutch Navy force commanded by Admiral Abraham Crijnssen arrives at the English colony of Surinam in South America and sails up the Suriname River to Fort Willoughby (later Fort Zeelandia at Paramaribo). Bombardment of the fort begins the next day, and its commander, William Byam surrenders, effectively giving control of Surinam to the Dutch Republic. The cession is confirmed with the signing of the Peace of Breda on July 31.
- February 27 (February 17 O.S.) – Joasaphus II is elected by the Council of Bishops as the new Patriarch of Moscow, leader of the Russian Orthodox Church, after conservative clerics depose Patriarch Nikon for his reformation of the Church.
- March 27 – In North America (Canada), explorer René-Robert Cavelier, Sieur de La Salle is released from the Society of Jesus (Jesuits).
- March – Louis XIV of France abolishes the livre parisis (Paris pound), in favor of the much more widely used livre tournois (Tours pound). He also designates Gabriel Nicolas de la Reynie as the first chief of "police" of Paris.

=== April–June ===
- April 6 – The 1667 Dubrovnik earthquake in the Republic of Ragusa (part of modern-day Croatia) kills as many as 5,000 people, roughly one sixth of the population, and levels most of the buildings in Dubrovnik.
- April 27 – The blind, impoverished, 58-year-old John Milton seals a contract for publication of Paradise Lost with London printer Samuel Simmons, for an initial payment of £5. The first edition is published in October and sells out in eighteen months.
- April 29–May 1 – Second Anglo-Dutch War: A Dutch flotilla under Admiral van Ghent enters the Firth of Forth in Scotland and bombards Burntisland.
- May 8 – Prince Prithviraj Singh, eldest son of the Maharaja Jaswant Singh of the Kingdom of Marwar (within India's Mughal Empire, part of the modern-day Rajasthan state) dies painfully at the age of 14, supposedly after putting on a khalat (a ceremonial robe) given to him by the Mughal Emperor Aurangzeb. According to the folklore of Marwar, the khalat was actually a garment infused with poison that penetrated the skin.
- May 22 – Fabio Chigi, Pope Alexander VII, dies at the age of 68 after a reign of 12 years. The election to find a successor opens on June 2.
- May 24 – After King Philip IV of Spain reneges on payment of a large dowry to King Louis XIV of France, promised to Louis as a gift for Louis' marriage to Philip's daughter Princess Maria Theresa, the War of Devolution begins between France and Spain. The French Army invades the Spanish Netherlands (modern-day Belgium), entering Flanders and Franche-Comté. By the time the war ends on May 2, 1668, parts of the Spanish Netherlands are ceded to France.
- June 15 – The first human blood transfusion is administered by Dr. Jean-Baptiste Denys. He transfuses the blood of a sheep to a 15-year-old boy. (Though this operation is a success, a later patient dies from the procedure and Denys is accused of murder).
- June 19–24 – The raid on the Medway in England is carried out when a fleet from the Dutch Republic under Admiral Michiel de Ruyter takes Sheerness fort, sails up the River Medway, raids Chatham Dockyard, and tows away the royal flagship The Royal Charles.
- June 20 – Giulio Rospigliosi is elected by the College of Cardinals to succeed the late Pope Alexander VII, after receiving 61 of the 64 votes of the cardinals present. He takes the regnal name Pope Clement IX, becoming the 238th head of the Roman Catholic Church.
- June 26 – Louis XIV of France conquers Tournai.
- June 27 – George Villiers, Duke of Buckingham, one of the five members of the Cabal ministry in England (Lords Chudleigh, Arlington, Buckingham, Ashley and Lauderdale), turns himself in after a warrant for his arrest is issued on February 25 on charges of treason (including the casting of the horoscope of King Charles II). He is held in the Tower of London for four years before being released on July 17, 1671.

=== July–September ===
- July 31 – Second Anglo-Dutch War – The Treaty of Breda ends the war by England against the Dutch Republic, France and Denmark and Norway. In the Americas, the Dutch retain control of Surinam, the English retain New Netherland and the French Acadia.
- August 5 – The province of Holland in the Dutch Republic passes the "Perpetual Edict" declaring that it will no longer acknowledge the authority of the republic's Stadtholder, and other provinces soon follow suit.
- August 10 – The Siege of Lille, at this time part of the Spanish Netherlands (modern-day Belgium) begins and becomes the only major engagement of the "War of Devolution" between France and Spain. The Spanish Army surrenders after 16 days.
- August 15
  - The League of the Rhine is dissolved by agreement of its members, nine years and one day after its formation as a military alliance between German kingdoms in the western part of the Holy Roman Empire.
  - John Dryden's comedy Sir Martin Mar-all, or The Feign'd Innocence is given its first performance, presented by the players of the King's Theatre in London.
- August 18 – In an effort to prevent narrow streets from being blocked from all light by tall buildings, the city of Paris enacts its first building code limiting the height of new construction. Buildings may be no taller than eight toise – 15.6 metres (51 ft) – tall. In 1783, rules are implemented to consider the width of the street.
- August 24 – The Treaty of Breda goes into effect after having been signed on July 31, bringing an end to hostilities between England and its three opponents.
- August 25 – In China, 14-year-old Xuanye, the Kangxi Emperor, participates in an ascension ceremony to take full power to rule China, bringing an end to the domination of the "Four Regents" who had been ruling in his name when he had first inherited the throne at the age of 6. The move comes shortly after the August 12 death of one of the regents, Sonin, when it becomes clear that the regents were planning to expand their power in advance of Kangxi's coming of age.
- September 6 – The "Dreadful Hurricane of 1667" ravages southeast Virginia, bringing 12 days of rain, blowing down plantation homes and stripping fields of crops.

=== October–December ===
- October 18 – Yohannes I becomes king of Ethiopia, following the death of his father Negus Fasilides.
- November 2 – In India, Assam troops led by General Lachit Borphukan, dispatched by King Supangmung, captures the Mughal Empire city of Guwahati after a victory in battle at Itakhuli.
- November 25 – A devastating earthquake rocks Caucasia and kills 80,000 people.
- December 19 – Emperor Aurangzeb, ruler of the Mughal Empire in India, orders a massive counterattack on Assam's Ahom kingdom after learning that Mughal troops had captured Guwahati. Aurangzeb appoints Raja Ram Singh to command a force of 36,000 infantry, 18,000 cavalry, 2,000 archers and 40 ships to conquer Ahom. The war lasts until the defeat of the Mughals by the smaller Ahom force in March 1671.

=== Date unknown ===
- After Shivaji's escape, hostilities between the Marathas and the Mughals ebb, with Mughal sardar Jaswant Singh acting as intermediary between Shivaji and Aurangzeb for new peace proposals.
- The first military campaign of Stenka Razin is conducted in Russia.
- The French army uses grenadiers.
- Robert Hooke demonstrates that the alteration of the blood in the lungs is essential for respiration.
- Isaac Newton has investigated and written on optics, acoustics, the infinitesimal calculus, mechanism and thermodynamics. The works will be published only years later.

== Births ==
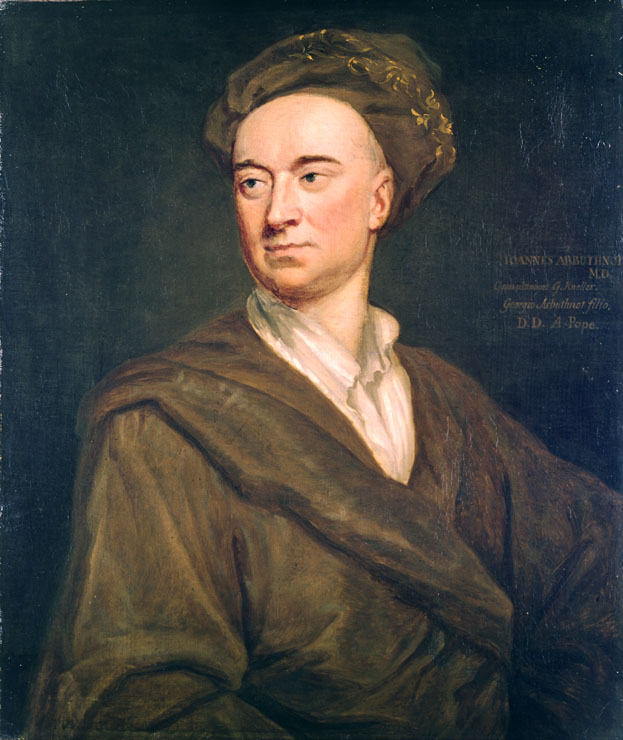
John Arbuthnot

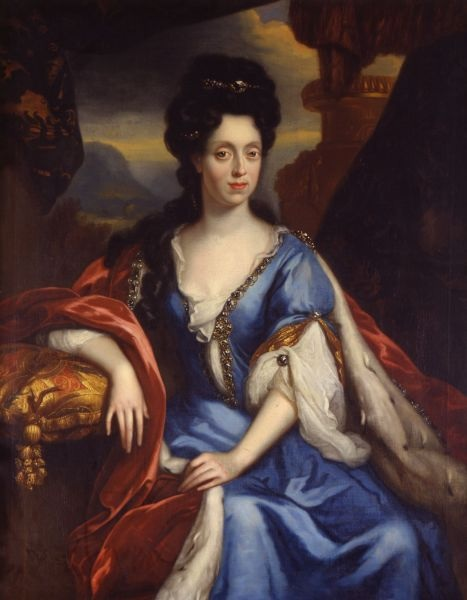
Anna Maria Luisa de' Medici

- April 29 – John Arbuthnot, English physician and writer (d. 1735)
- May 26 – Abraham de Moivre, French mathematician (d. 1754)
- June 18 – Ivan Trubetskoy, Russian field marshal (d. 1750)
- July 2 – Pietro Ottoboni, Italian cardinal (d. 1740)
- July 27 – Johann Bernoulli, Swiss mathematician (d. 1748)
- August 11 – Anna Maria Luisa de' Medici, last of the Medicis of Italy (d. 1743)
- September 5 – Giovanni Girolamo Saccheri, Italian mathematician (d. 1733)
- September 28 – Asano Naganori, Japanese warlord (d. 1701)
- November 2 – James Sobieski, Crown Prince of Poland (d. 1737)
- November 5 – Christoph Ludwig Agricola, German painter (d. 1719)
- November 30 – Jonathan Swift, Irish writer (d. 1745)
- December 9 – William Whiston, English mathematician (d. 1752)
- December 25 – Ehrengard Melusine von der Schulenburg, Duchess of Kendal and Munster (d. 1743)
- date unknown
  - Yaoya Oshichi, Japanese girl burned at the stake for arson (d. 1683)
  - Anna Colbjørnsdatter, Norwegian heroine (d. 1736)
  - Beinta Broberg, notorious Faroese vicar's wife (d. 1752)
  - Susanna Verbruggen, English actress (d. 1703)
- probable –
  - Antonio Lotti, Italian composer (d. 1740)
  - Susanna Centlivre, English actress and playwright (d. 1723)

== Deaths ==
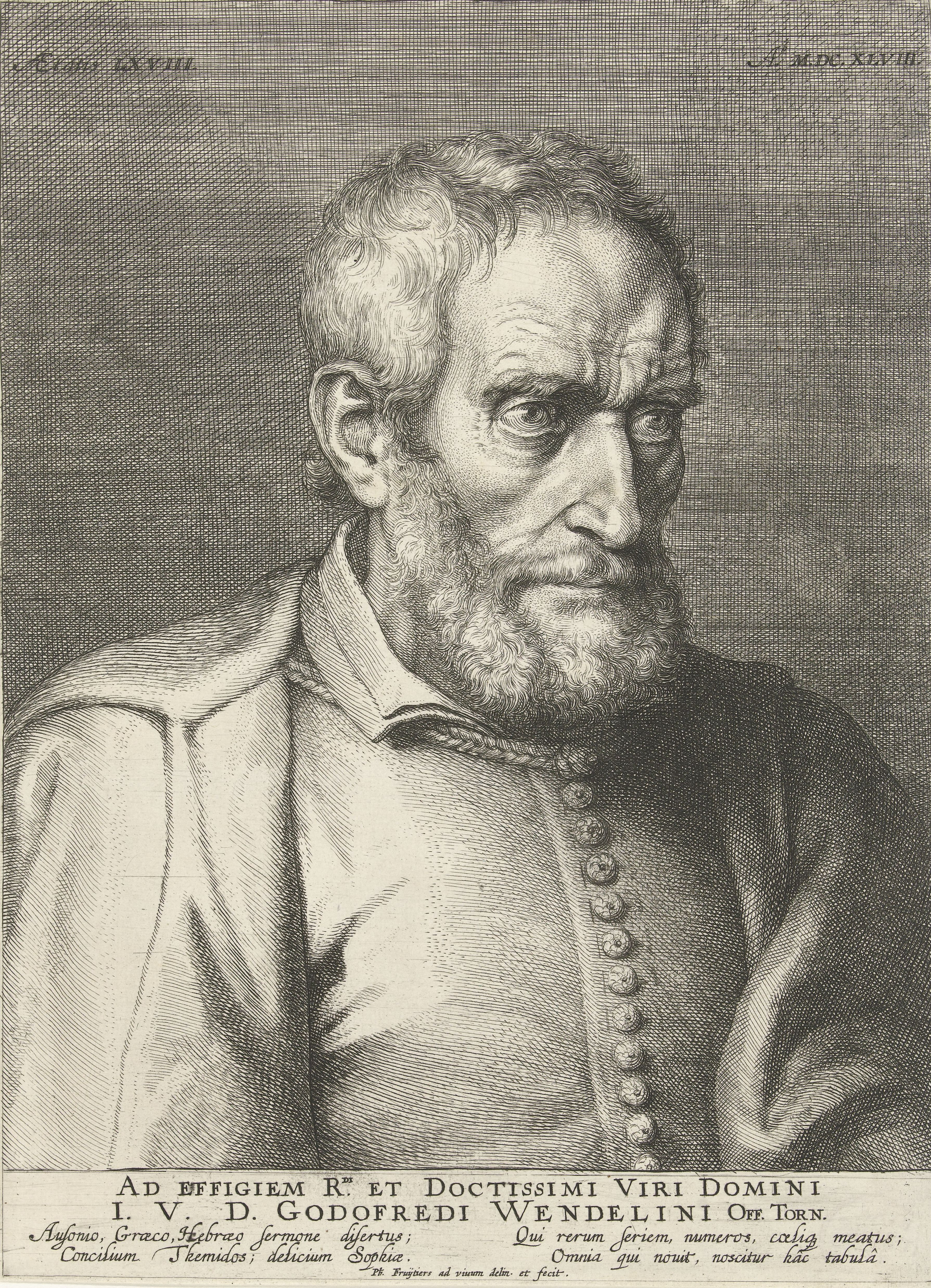
Godefroy Wendelin

- January 28 – Maria Klara of Dietrichstein, German noblewoman (b. 1626)
- February 16 – Vincenzo Maculani, Italian Catholic cardinal (b. 1578)
- April 2 – Reinhold Curicke, jurist and historian from Danzig (Gdańsk) (b. 1610)
- April 10 – Jan Marek Marci, Bohemian physician and scientist (b. 1595)
- April 13 – Bassam Al-Soukaria, Lebanese army commander (b. 1580)
- April 21 – Roger Hill, English politician (b. 1605)
- April 24 – Matthew Wren, influential English clergyman (b. 1585)
- April 25 – Peter of Saint Joseph Betancur, Spanish saint and missionary to Guatemala (b. 1626)
- May 2 – George Wither, English writer (b. 1588)
- May 7 – Johann Jakob Froberger, German composer (b. 1616)
- May 10 – Marie Louise Gonzaga, Polish queen (b. 1611)
- May 14
  - Marcos Ramírez de Prado y Ovando, Archbishop of Mexico (b. 1592)
  - Georges de Scudéry, French novelist, dramatist and poet (b. 1601)
  - Johannes Heinrich Ursinus, German Lutheran scholar (b. 1608)
- May 16
  - Samuel Bochart, French Protestant biblical scholar (b. 1599)
  - Thomas Wriothesley, 4th Earl of Southampton, English statesman (b. 1607)
- May 22 – Pope Alexander VII (b. 1599)
- May 25 – Gustaf Bonde, Swedish statesman (b. 1620)
- May 26 – Albrecht von Kalckstein, German noble (b. 1592)
- May 28 – Jacques de Bela, French writer (b. 1586)
- June 5
  - Johann Heinrich Hottinger, Swiss philologist and theologian (b. 1620)
  - Francesco Sforza Pallavicino, Italian cardinal and historian (b. 1607)
  - Grégoire de Saint-Vincent, Flemish Jesuit and mathematician (b. 1584)
- June 18 – Countess Louise Henriette of Nassau, Electress Consort of Brandenburg (b. 1627)
- June 19 – Anthony Günther, Count of Oldenburg (b. 1583)
- June 20 – James Stuart, Duke of Cambridge, British prince (b. 1663)
- July 4
  - Christiaen van Couwenbergh, Dutch painter (b. 1604)
  - John VI, Prince of Anhalt-Zerbst (1621–1667) (b. 1621)
- July 7 – Nicolas Sanson, French cartographer (b. 1600)
- July 11 – Stefano Durazzo, Italian cardinal (b. 1594)
- July 13 – Barthélemy Vimont, French missionary (b. 1594)
- July 28 – Abraham Cowley, English poet (b. 1618)
- August 3 – Francesco Borromini, Swiss sculptor and architect (b. 1599)
- August 8 – Frances Hyde, Countess of Clarendon, English noble (b. 1617)
- August 13
  - Jeremy Taylor, Irish clergyman and writer (b. 1613)
  - Margaret Elisabeth of Leiningen-Westerburg, Regent of Hesse-Homburg (b. 1604)
- August 28 – Jai Singh I, Maharaja of Jaipur (b. 1611)
- September 3 – Alonso Cano, Spanish painter (b. 1601)
- September 10 – Erasmus Earle, English barrister and politician (b. 1590)
- September 20 – Niels Trolle, Governor General of Norway (b. 1599)
- September 24 – Michael Franck, German composer and poet (b. 1609)
- September 28 – Thomas Hall, English politician (b. 1619)
- September 29 – Herbert Morley, English politician (b. 1616)
- October 11 – Mattias de' Medici, Italian noble (b. 1613)
- October 18 – Emperor Fasilides of Ethiopia (b. 1603)
- October 24 – Godefroy Wendelin, Flemish astronomer (b. 1580)
- October 22 – Albert II, Margrave of Brandenburg-Ansbach, German prince (b. 1620)
- October 25 – Ernst Adalbert of Harrach, Austrian Catholic cardinal (b. 1598)
- November 12 – Hans Nansen, Danish statesman (b. 1598)
- November 19 – Robert Wallop, English politician (b. 1601)
- November 28 – Jean de Thévenot, French traveler and scientist (b. 1633)
- December 31 – Jerzy Sebastian Lubomirski, Polish noble (szlachcic) (b. 1616)
