= Anthony Colve =

Dutch military officer, governor of New Netherland

Director of New Netherland
- In office 19 September 1673 – 10 November 1674
- Preceded by: Francis Lovelace; John Berry
- Succeeded by: Edmund Andros; Philip Carteret

Personal details
- Born: 1644 Veere, Dutch Republic
- Died: 29 June 1693 (aged 48–49) Veere
- Party: Orangist
- Spouse: Margarethe de Quade
- Profession: military officer

Anthony or Anthonij Colve (Veere, 1644 – Veere, 29 June 1693) was a Dutch captain of Marines and the Governor-General of New Netherland during a brief restoration of Dutch rule in New Netherland during the Third Anglo-Dutch War.

== Personal life ==
Colve was the son of Jacob Colve, a scion of an old Veere family, and Maria de Margenault. His widowed mother bought an annuity for him in 1653, which would pay out until his death in 1693. Colve married Margarethe "Griton" de Quade. Two daughters and a son are known of this marriage. His son Jacob Lambert Colve (died 1723) was mayor of Veere and a member of the States of Zeeland from 1717 to 1722.

== Career ==
Of Colve's early life is little known, except that he made his profession as a member of the Dutch Reformed Church in Veere in 1664.

=== Early military career ===
Colve was involved in the recapture of Suriname from the English by a Zeeland squadron led by Abraham Crijnssen in March 1667 during the Second Anglo-Dutch War. Crijnssen made him an ensign, and he remained behind in the fortress that the Dutch had captured, after Crijnssen left. After the Peace of Breda an English fleet, that did not know the peace had been signed, invaded Suriname and retook the colony. Colve was made a prisoner of war and interned on Barbados. He was eventually brought to London, and released, a year after the peace.

Upon his return in 1668, he was posted as an ensign in Fort Sint-Anna (Saaftinge) until 1670, when he became a captain at Fort Lillo. During this time Colve was court-martialled for the loss of his flag during the recapture of Suriname by the English. He was eventually exonerated on the exact day prince William III of Orange was inaugurated as "First Noble" (Note: The First Noble was one of the five members of the States, the others being four voting cities: Middelburg, Goes, Zierikzee, and Tholen. The First Noble represented the Zeeland nobility in the States since the Middle Ages. During the Dutch Republic period the position was always taken by the Prince of Orange, as William the Silent had bought the marquisates of Veere and Vlissingen at auction in 1572 and so "owned" their votes in the States. The First Noble therefore was not the "sovereign" of Zeeland.)in the States of Zeeland in 1668, in defiance of the Perpetual Edict. (Note: This may indicate that he was a member of the Orangist faction in Zeeland that was led by the Zeeland Grand Pensionary Pieter de Huybert and his nephew Justus de Huybert, the clerk of the States.) In 1672, he moved with his troops to Veere.

=== Recapture of New Netherland ===
After the beginning of the Third Anglo-Dutch War, which was part of the Franco-Dutch War, in 1672, the Zeeland authorities (Note: Principally involved were Justus de Huybert, the clerk of the Admiralty (and also of the States of Zeeland), and his uncle Pieter de Huybert, the Grand Pensionary of Zeeland, who wrote the two secret instructions to Evertsen.) in deepest secret planned a naval expedition to do their enemies harm and earn appreciable sums from prizes that might be captured in the course of it. The leadership of the expedition was entrusted to admiral Cornelis Evertsen the Youngest. Colve, now a captain, was made the officer commanding the 64 marines aboard the flagship of the squadron commanded by Evertsen, the Swaenenburgh. (Note: Formerly HMS Saint Patrick, which had been captured by the Dutch on 5 February 1667 and then commissioned in the fleet of the Admiralty of Zeeland under the new name.) The squadron marauded along the coast of present-day Suriname and the Wild Coast, and other parts of the Caribbean, before starting up the coast of the English colonies in North-America. (Note: One of the places reconnoitered was the French city of Cayenne in French Guiana. Evertsen, together with Colve, boarded a snow to personally reconnoiter the approaches to Cayenne, but decided that a landing would be too complicated.) In Virginia Evertsen and Jacob Binckes, the commander of another Dutch squadron, from the Admiralty of Amsterdam, that had joined the Zeeland squadron in the Caribbean, learned that governor Lovelace of colonial New York, which only recently had been New Netherland, before the English had captured it in 1664, was absent in Hartford, Connecticut, conferring with the governor of that colony, John Winthrop the Younger. They therefore decided to recapture the colony, and invaded it on Wednesday 30 July 1673. (Note: This again is an Old Style date, as Shomette and Haslach follow the Julian calendar dates used in the English sources. Evertsen's log uses the New Style date of 9 August 1673.) Colve led the landing party of about 600 marines (Note: The marine force had grown considerably during the expedition, including a number of Englishmen of captured ships, who had enlisted in the Dutch force.) that took the former New Amsterdam. Colve landed to the north of the city and then marched down Broadway street (formerly Heeren straat). The Dutch colonists cheered along the way and joined the force. Arriving before Fort James, which had been severely bombarded by the Dutch squadron (now 19 ships, including prizes) he demanded its surrender. The garrison commander, captain John Manning, agreed to capitulate, after he was granted the honours of war. So the English troops marched out, flags flying and drums beating, and then laid down their arms. They were made prisoners of war and housed for the night in the Dutch Reformed Church within the wall of the fort.The next day they were brought aboard the ships.

Commission of Anthony Colve as governor-general of New Orange

=== Governor-general of New Orange ===
After the city was thus taken over, Evertsen and Binckes formed a krijgsraad (council of war) in which Colve also took a seat, that provisionally governed the colony. Colve was appointed "Governor-General" by the krijgsraad on 12 August 1673. (Note: Though he assumed the responsibilities that had under Dutch rule been those of the Director of New Netherland.) The territory he was to administer ran from Cape Henlopen to North river. This encompassed the area that had been formerly the Dutch colony of New Netherland as it existed up to 1664. Colve was to be assisted by a council consisting of Cornelius Steenwyk, as main advisor in legal matters; Nicholas Bayard as clerk of the council; and Cornelis Eewoutsen (Note: The captain of the ship Sint Joris. The Sint Joris was a ketch, originally intended as a fireship.) as superintendent of fortifications and gunnery. Evertsen and Binckes, realizing that Dutch control of the colony was still precarious sent out commissioners to demand submission from outlying townships in Delaware, New Jersey and Long Island (all previously part of New Netherland). At the same time they ordered those communities to reform their local governments on the Dutch model of burgomasters, schout, and schepenen, which colleges were to be appointed by the Dutch krijgsraad that temporarily administered "New Orange" (as New York was re-christened). The communities were to this end to elect commissions that would nominate dubbeltallen (double lists of nominees) for the krijgsraad to select from. (Note: This had long been the customary way of selection of local magistrates in the province of Holland by its stadtholder) Most communities, intimidated by the Dutch military presence at New Orange, at least promised compliance, though in some cases with evident misgivings. The krijgsraad also received delegations of Mohawks and Hackensack people, who expressed a desire to have peaceful relations with the new administration. Evertsen and Binckes started a program of reinforcement of both the Manhattan fortress (now re-christend fort Willem Hendrick) and the fort near Albany/Beverwyck which had been re-christened Fort Nassau (Albany became Willemstad). At the end of August Evertsen and Binckes started to make preparations to leave with the greater part of the fleet, to continue their naval expedition, to the distress of the Dutch colonists, who were afraid they would be left to the mercy of their English neighbors without the protection of the fleet. To alleviate that distress Evertsen decided to leave the warships Zeehond (Note: A so-called snauw, a typical Dutch small sloop-like warship that should not be confused with the brig-rigged snow (ship). The Zeehond carried six iron 3-pdrs.) and Suriname (Note: The Suriname had in 1666 been HMS Richard and Frances, that was captured by Abraham Crijnssen and then recommissioned by the Zeeland admiralty. It was originally commanded by Evertsen's brother Evert Evertsen Fransz. who died during the expedition from an illness. Suriname carried 25 iron cannon of divers calibers. She had 64 marines on board, under command of ensign Antonij Malepaart.) behind. The remainder of the fleet left on 18 September 1673.

Colve began his administration on 19 September 1673. He ostensibly restored the laws as they had been under the regime of the Dutch West India Company (WIC), but in reality he assumed more powers than previous Directors had done. (Note: Anikin accuses Colve of "terrorizing" the colony and of "employing medieval tortures". But the source that he references: O'Callaghan and Fernow, only quotes the excerpt of the Dutch Artikelbrief (equivalent of Articles of War cf. Dutch States Army) promulgated by Colve, on that page. There is no proof of his using torture in the documents that O'Callaghan and Ferrow published. Maybe Anikin was misled by the boiler-plate legal term "without torture" used in a number of sentences Colve pronounced during his administration as the chief judge of the colony (there was no Separation of powers in contemporary Dutch constitutional practice). This term is a translation of the formula from Roman-Dutch law buiten pijn en ijzeren banden that was routinely put in sentences based on that law, indicating that a confession by the defendant had been repeated in open court without duress. That didn't imply whether or not torture had in fact been used previously. Torture was indeed used in capital cases in Dutch courts, but the documents in O'Callaghan and Fernow give no indication that was the case under Colve's administration.) Colve put the colony under military discipline with harsh punishments for transgressions of the Dutch Articles of War as promulgated for the Dutch States Army. He repeatedly threatened English settlements on Long Island to make them submit to Dutch rule. He met resistance in especially the eastern part of Long Island, an area that was also of interest to governor Winthrop of the Connecticut Colony. (Note: Winthrop on 21 October 1673 (O.S.) sent a peremptory letter to Colve to desist from interfering in East Long Island and stop harming the interests of Connecticut residents, in the name of International Law. Colve replied by questioning whether he had really sent such an insolent letter. Winthrop replied that he had. This illustrates that diplomatic proprieties were still being observed, despite the state of war between te Mother countries.) There ensued a "tug-of-war" between Colve's commissioners, and the Connecticut commissioners, led by Fitz-John Winthrop, the son of the governor, for the favor of the Long Island colonists, which ended in a victory for Connecticut.

The Dutch settlements in the South of New Netherland were also threatened. The proprietor of the Maryland Colony, Lord Baltimore had even in 1672, while the area was in English hands, claimed the Delaware part of the proprietorship of New Jersey. When the area swore allegiance to the regime in New Orange, his son Charles Calvert, the acting governor of Maryland, sent troops to the Dutch settlement of Whorekill (Hoerenkil in Dutch) who burned it down in December 1673, and left the inhabitants destitute and homeless in mid-Winter. Colve was unable to do anything about it, but he saw to it that the refugees received shelter in New Orange.

Initially the English colonists in New England had adopted a wait-and-see attitude toward the new regime in New Netherland. This changed, however, after an English privateer took the buss Expectation, a prize that Colve had sent to the Netherlands with important correspondence, in November 1673. Colve sent the snauw, called Zeehond, on a privateering mission on the Long Island Sound, which captured four Massachusetts ketches in retaliation. (Note: Colve set the crews of the ketches free immediately, however, and asked the Massachusetts governor to reciprocate.) This motivated the Massachusetts government to get serious about mobilizing troops and warships to deal with the Dutch. As it was clear that the Dutch in New Netherland stood little chance against the combined might of the New Englanders if the conflict got serious, Colve embarked on a policy of improving the defenses of New Netherland. The militia companies of the outlying Dutch settlements on the East River and further east on Long Island were mobilized; a new company of foot was raised under the command of councillor Steenwyck; and serious measures were taken to improve the defenses of Fort Willem Hendrick. (Note: This included measures to clear away buildings near the Fort's wall, to improve its field of fire. The proprietors of the razed buildings were compensated, which put a strain on the finances of the New Orange government. To alleviate that strain Colve's council instituted a "wealth tax" on the wealthiest inhabitants of the city. This required the compilation of a register of assets, which took some time and effort. As the financial crisis grew pressing, Colve next decided to impose a forced loan on the wealthiest residents in the Spring of 1674.)

The worsened relations with New England also engendered fears of spies and agitators. There was an incident with one Francis Beano, who was apprehended after making threats in the village of Fordham. He readily confessed and was sentenced to branding and banishment as an example. But the incident motivated Colve to put strict controls on the communication with the English settlements. Travelers were enjoined to surrender letters they brought with them to the authorities on entering the colony on pain of a fine, payable in beaver skins at the Wampum exchange rate.

Aware that the outlying villages in the East of the colony would be indefensible in case of an invasion by the New Englanders, Colve made an inspection tour of the area and left strict instructions on how to act in case of such an invasion. The plan was to evacuate the civilian population in that case to New Orange. To prepare for that eventuality Colve ordered that dwellings in the town would be made available, as had earlier been done for the refugees from Hoerenkil.

Meanwhile, relations with the East Riding of Long Island, and its protectors in Connecticut remained tense, with posturing on both sides. All of this added to the siege mentality of the Dutch in New Orange in the Spring of 1674. The Fort was now at full readiness. The garrison had grown to 800 men and the wall was bristling with 180 great guns, while the warship Suriname, anchored before the fort, added its own fire power. Colve ordered the people of the outlying settlements to retreat to the fort fully armed in case of an invasion. Those who shirked that duty were threatened with execution as "tratitors", as were people who would leave the town without authorization during an emergency. To make sure that a sufficient number of boats would be available for the evacuation, Colve ordered that small craft would be concentrated behind a defensive float outside the harbor, under the protection of the guns of the warship and the roundel of the fort.

=== Transfer of power ===
However, while all this was going on, events in Europe changed the situation dramatically. Under pressure from Spain, which was ready to come to the aid of the Dutch Republic in its war with France, but refused to do this as long as the war with England was going on, the States General of the Netherlands concluded the Peace of Westminster with king Charles in February 1674. One of the provisions was an exchange of New Netherland for Suriname. Consequently, the States General in April 1674 ordered the Amsterdam and Zeeland admiralties to make preparations for the peaceful transfer of power in New Orange to the English. Formal orders to that effect reached Colve only on 9 October 1674, (Note: For the text of the orders and related documents that were conveyed by a captain Toll of the Amsterdam admiralty, cf. O'Callaghan and Fernow, pp.730-734) but the news had already percolated through in early May 1674. (Note: The news of the treaty had reached Boston and Hartford in early May 1674. An Englishman, John Sharpe, who had been banished from New Orange, petitioned Colve, through the intermediary of one Isaac Melyn, to be allowed to return to the city, a few days later. Melvyn transmitted the news of the peace together with the petition. He omitted the news that the colony was to be surrendered to the English, however. Sharpe subsequently entered New Orange (still without permission) carrying a number of letters, among which the original communications received in Boston on 7 May with the full news, including the part about the surrender. Colve, fearing that this news would cause great perturbation among the populace, forbade Sharpe to speak publicly about it. But Sharpe did it anyway. And Melyn also spread the news. Both were severely punished by Colve, but the harm had been done.) The Dutch colonists reacted with rage to the news at the time, because they felt betrayed by the States General and threatened to take out their anger on Colve. But he remained in command and started to make preparations for the transfer. In June the confiscated English possessions were returned to their former owners. The Zeehond and Suriname were sent home to the Netherlands. Colve formally proclaimed the Peace on 1 July 1674, the same day that the Duke of York appointed Edmund Andros the new governor of New York, in England. When that worthy finally arrived at the roadstead of Manhattan, the city was transferred by Colve on 10 November 1674 N.S. (30 October 1674 O.S.). He left Andros his carriage and horses as a courtesy. (Note: As a postscript: The Dutch burghers of New York complained in a petition to the States General, read on 12 October 1675, that governor Andros had ordered them to swear an oath of allegiance, or to leave New York, contrary to the privileges contained in the 1664 capitulation, to which they protested, and that Andros in retaliation had them locked up and instigated legal proceedings against them, contrary to the provisions of the Peace of Westminster. The States General thereupon protested to the Court of St. James with little effect.)

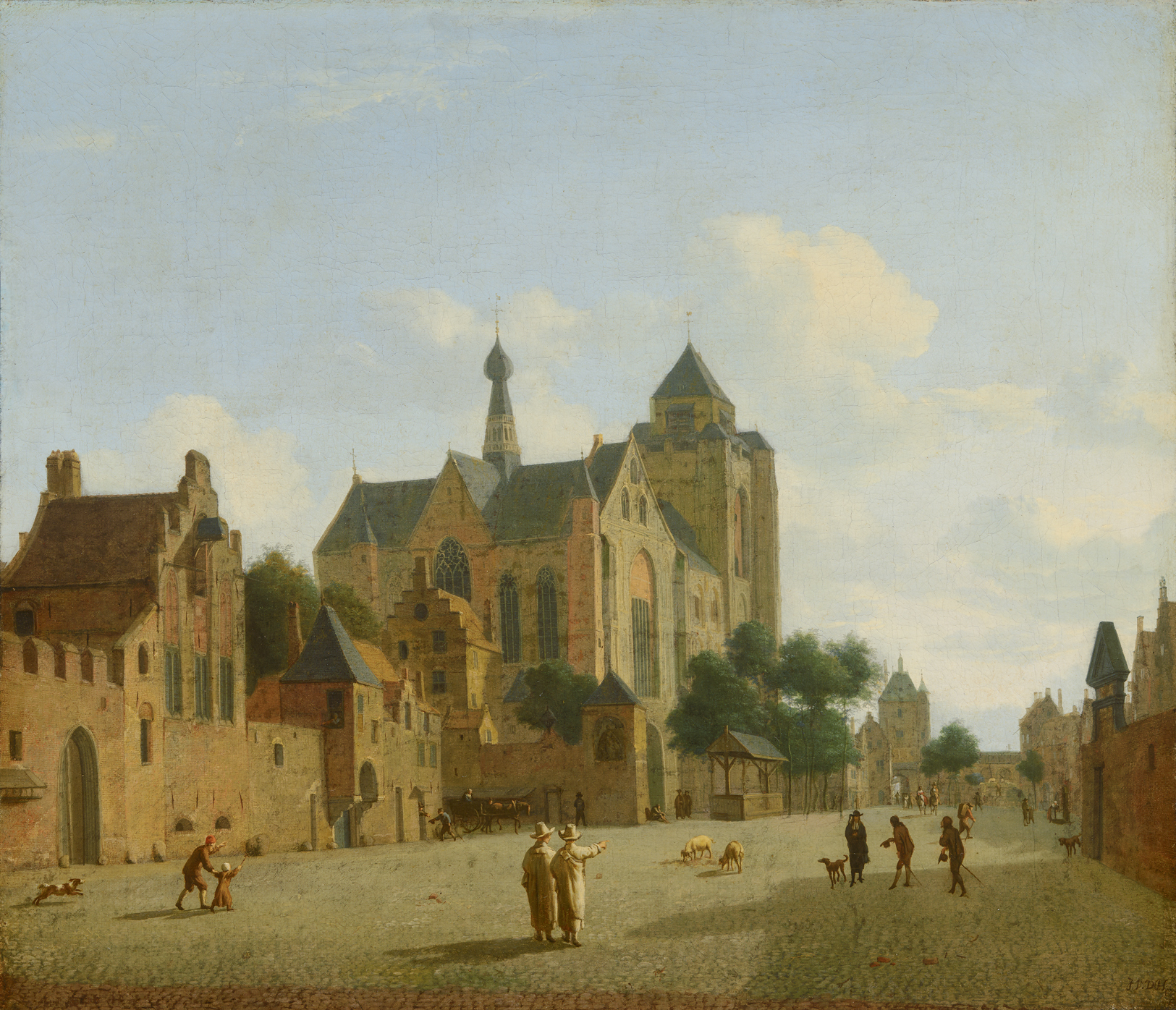
The Grote Kerk in Veere where Colve was buried (Note: Contemporary painting by Jan van der Heyden)

Colve afterwards went to Suriname, which was now under Dutch rule, on the basis of the Treaty of Westminster, but little is known about his sojourn there.

=== Later military career ===
Upon his return to the Dutch Republic he was made a sergeant-major (Note: This was not akin to the current non-commissioned officer rank, but a commissioned officer in the Dutch States Army, between "captain" and "lieutenant-colonel", equal to current major.) in the Dutch States Army regiment on the Zeeland repartitie (Note: The contribution the States of Zeeland annually paid to the War Budget of the Dutch Republic.Cf. Dutch States Army#Fraud and mustering.) under Caspar de Mauregnault in 1679, and lieutenant-colonel under Jacques-Louis Comte de Noyelles on 22 March 1683. He was last reported as a commandeur of Veere (Note: Commandeur was not a rank but the function of commander of the garrison of a fortress. Veere in this time was an important naval base and also a fortress of the Dutch States Army.) in 1693 during the Nine Years' War.

Colve died on 29 June 1693 in Veere, where he was buried in the Grote Kerk.

== See also ==
- New Netherland
- Director of New Netherland
- List of colonial governors of New York
- List of colonial governors of New Jersey

== Sources ==
- Anikin, Artyom (2015). "The Lost Soldier of Orange: A Brief Biography of Governor Anthony Colve, 1644–1693". New York History. 96 (3–4). Cornell University Press: 336–353. doi:10.1353/nyh.2016.0048. S2CID 166112733.
- Leune, J.M.G. (March 2016). "Appendix: Bijzonderheden over betrokkenen bij het fort St. Anna". Het fort Sint Anna in de polder van Namen (in Dutch).
- O'Callaghan, E.B.; Fernow. B., eds. (1858). Documents Relative to the Colonial History of the State of New-York, procured in Holland, England and France by John Romeyn Brodhead, Esq. Vol. 2. Albany: Weed, Parsons, and Co.
- Shomette, Donald G.; Haslach, Robert D. (1988). Raid on America: The Dutch Naval campaign of 1672-1674. University of South Carolina Press. ISBN 978-0788422454.
- De Waard, Cornelis (1928). De Zeeuwsche expeditie naar de West onder Cornelis Evertsen den Jonge 1672-1674: Nieuw Nederland een jaar onder Nederlandsch Bestuur (in Dutch). Linschoten Vereeniging.

Government offices
Preceded by John Berry as Governor of the Province of New Jersey	Director of New Netherland; 1673–1674	Succeeded by Philip Carteret as Governor of the Province of New Jersey
Preceded by Francis Lovelace as Governor of the Province of New York	Director of New Netherland; 1673–1674	Succeeded by Sir Edmund Andros as Governor of the Province of New York
