= Philip Lichtenberg =

Governor of Surinam

Governor of Suriname
- In office 16 February 1669 – March 1671
- Preceded by: Abraham Crijnssen (acting)
- Succeeded by: Pierre Versterre (acting)

Personal details
- Born: Philip Julius Lichtenberg; 26 April 1637; Heusden, Dutch Republic
- Died: March 1678 (aged 40); Dutch Republic

Philip Julius Lichtenberg also van Lichtenberg, (26 April 1637 - March 1678) was a governor of Surinam. He was governor from 16 February 1669 until March 1671.

== Biography ==
Lichtenberg was born on 26 April 1637 in Heusden, Netherlands. He studied law first at the University of Utrecht, and later Leiden University where he received his licentiate. After graduating, he joined the army.

In 1666, Captains Lichtenberg and de Rama with 225 soldiers were dispatched by the States of Zeeland to fight the British in America during the Second Anglo-Dutch War. In 1667, under the command of Abraham Crijnssen, they conquered the English colony of Surinam. The soldiers were from Zeeland, therefore, the Province of Zeeland considered Surinam their colony, however the States General of the Netherlands disagreed.

On 22 September 1667, Lichtenberg was awarded a gold medal, and promoted to lieutenant colonel. On 4 December 1668, Lichtenberg was appointed Governor of Surinam by the States of Zeeland, and boarded a ship to Surinam. The States General initially disapproved of the unilateral appointment, however on 16 February 1669, he was sworn in by Abraham Crijnssen.

The colony was in bad shape after the war. Crijnssen had made a deal with the Jewish plantation owners in Jodensavanna, however many of the English planters wanted to leave the colony for Barbados and Antigua. Lindenberg had no intention of stopping the planters from leaving, but wanted to minimize the losses for the planters.

To govern the colony, Lindenberg created a Court of Policy consisting of five Dutch councillors chaired by the governor, and a Court of Justice consisting of three Dutch councillors and two English councillors also chaired by the governor. The States of Zeeland insisted on the inclusion of the English in the criminal court. Strict laws were being issued including a death penalty for adultery. Paramaribo became the capital of the colony, however the courts would still meet at Torarica, the former capital, as well.

Lichtenberg became ill, and asked to be replaced. He decided to remain for his planned meeting with James Bannister, the former English governor of Surinam, to discuss the planned departure of some of the planters. Lichtenberg left for the Netherlands in March 1671, and became the colonial advisor for the States of Zeeland.

Lichtenberg died in March 1678.

== Bibliography ==
- Benjamins, Herman Daniël; Snelleman, Johannes (1917). Encyclopaedie van Nederlandsch West-Indië (in Dutch). Leiden: Martinus Nijhoff Publishers – via Digital Library for Dutch Literature.
- Wolbers, J. (1861). Geschiedenis van Suriname (in Dutch). Amsterdam. ISBN 90-6033-091-9.
