= Invasion of Surinam (1667) =

Dutch invasion of Surinam 1667

- Part of the Second Anglo-Dutch War
Date	25–27 February 1667.
Location	Suriname
Result	Dutch victory: Surinam captured; English pay 100,000 pounds of sugar to the Dutch

Belligerents
Dutch Republic	England

Commanders and leaders
(Dutch Republic) Abraham Crijnssen	(England) William Byam

Strength
7 Ships	200 Englishmen great number of black slaves

Casualties and losses
Unknown	Unknown

The Invasion of Surinam was a Dutch attempt to capture the English held colony of Surinam in February 1667. The Dutch under the command of Abraham Crijnssen captured the colony without much resistance.

== Background ==
Following the outbreak of the Second Anglo-Dutch War, the Dutch deployed a force under Admiral Abraham Crijnssen to capture Surinam. Crijnssen's force arrived at the mouth of the Suriname River on 25 February 1667.

== Invasion ==
When he arrived he started bombarding Surinam. After a while William Byam, surrendered after a brief skirmish. Following the surrender, the English colonists in the region were required to pay a sum of 100,000 pounds of sugar as a form of ransom. Subsequently, they were given the choice of leaving or pledging their allegiance to the States of Zealand, a Dutch province. The majority of the English colonists opted to swear allegiance to the Dutch authorities.

Many of the English colonists had grown weary of the stringent rule imposed by the English, and Abraham Crijnssen, offered a different approach. He assured them that his intention was not to destroy but to rebuild. As part of his efforts, Crijnssen renamed the town of Paramaribo as Nieuw-Middelburg and Fort Willoughby as Fort Zeelandia.

To transport the significant amount of sugar collected as part of the ransom, Crijnssen arranged for it to be shipped to Zealand using the vessel Aardenburg.
