= Invasion of Surinam =

Invasion of Surinam may refer to:

- Invasion of Surinam (1667)
- Invasion of Surinam (1804)
