= Abbot of Saint-Romain =

French diplomat

Abbot of Saint-Romain was a French diplomat commissioned by Louis XIV to visit Portugal in 1666 with the mission of drawing it into the sphere of France, preventing the establishment of an understanding between Portugal and Spain, which was desired by England. In fact, he managed to get a treaty signed between Portugal and France in 1667, with the value of a defensive and offensive alliance against the Castile and its allies.
