= Surinam =

Surinam may refer to several territories or states in South America:

- Surinam (English colony) (1650–1667), in what is now the country of Suriname
- Surinam (Dutch colony) (1667–1954), or Dutch Guiana, a plantation colony in the Guianas
- Suriname, a country established in 1954
