= Fort Zeelandia (Paramaribo) =

Fortress in Paramaribo, Suriname

- Part of Suriname
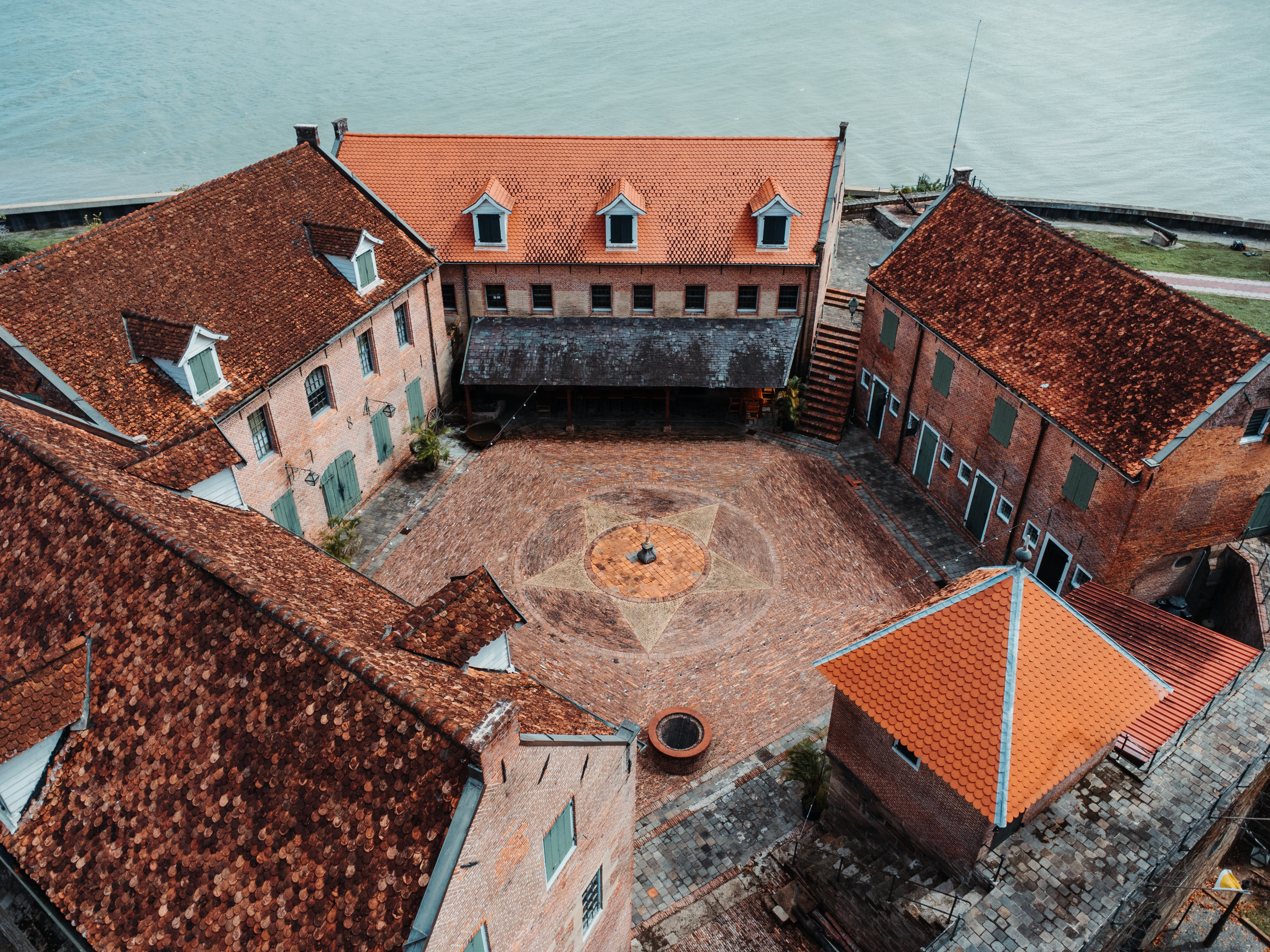
- Fort Zeelandia in Paramaribo

Location
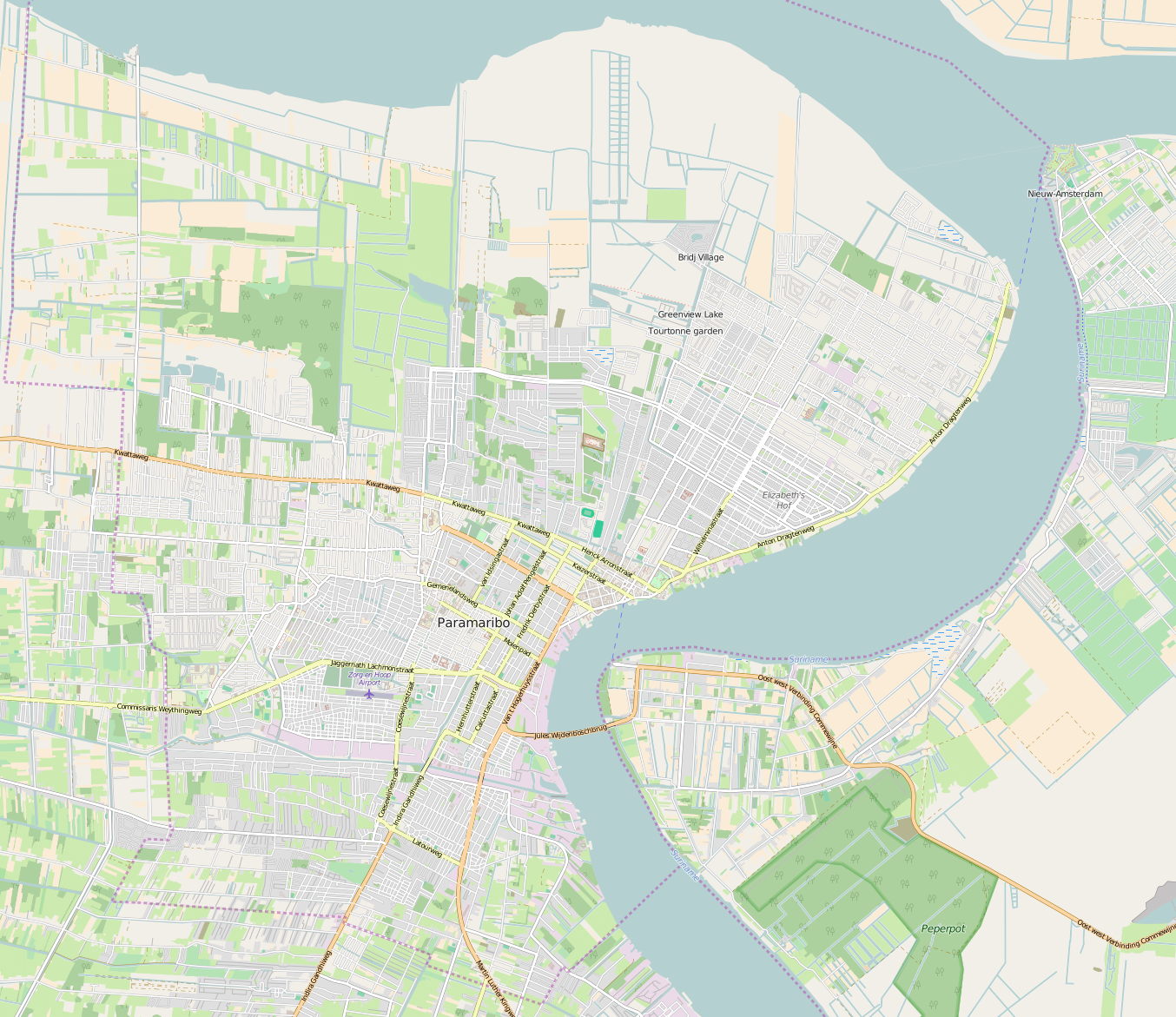
- Coordinates: 5.8252°N 55.149872°W

Site history
- Built: 1651

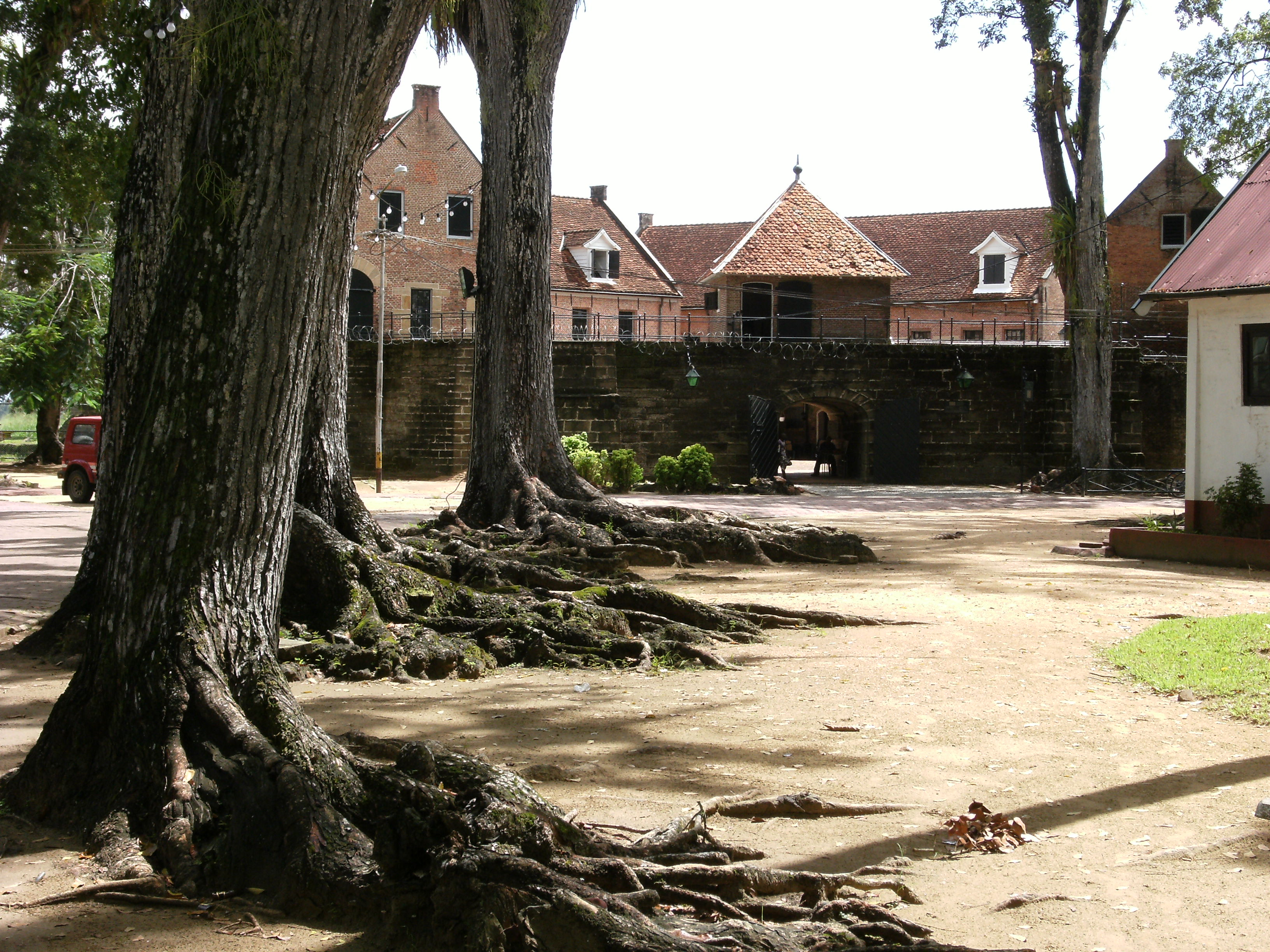
Fort Zeelandia

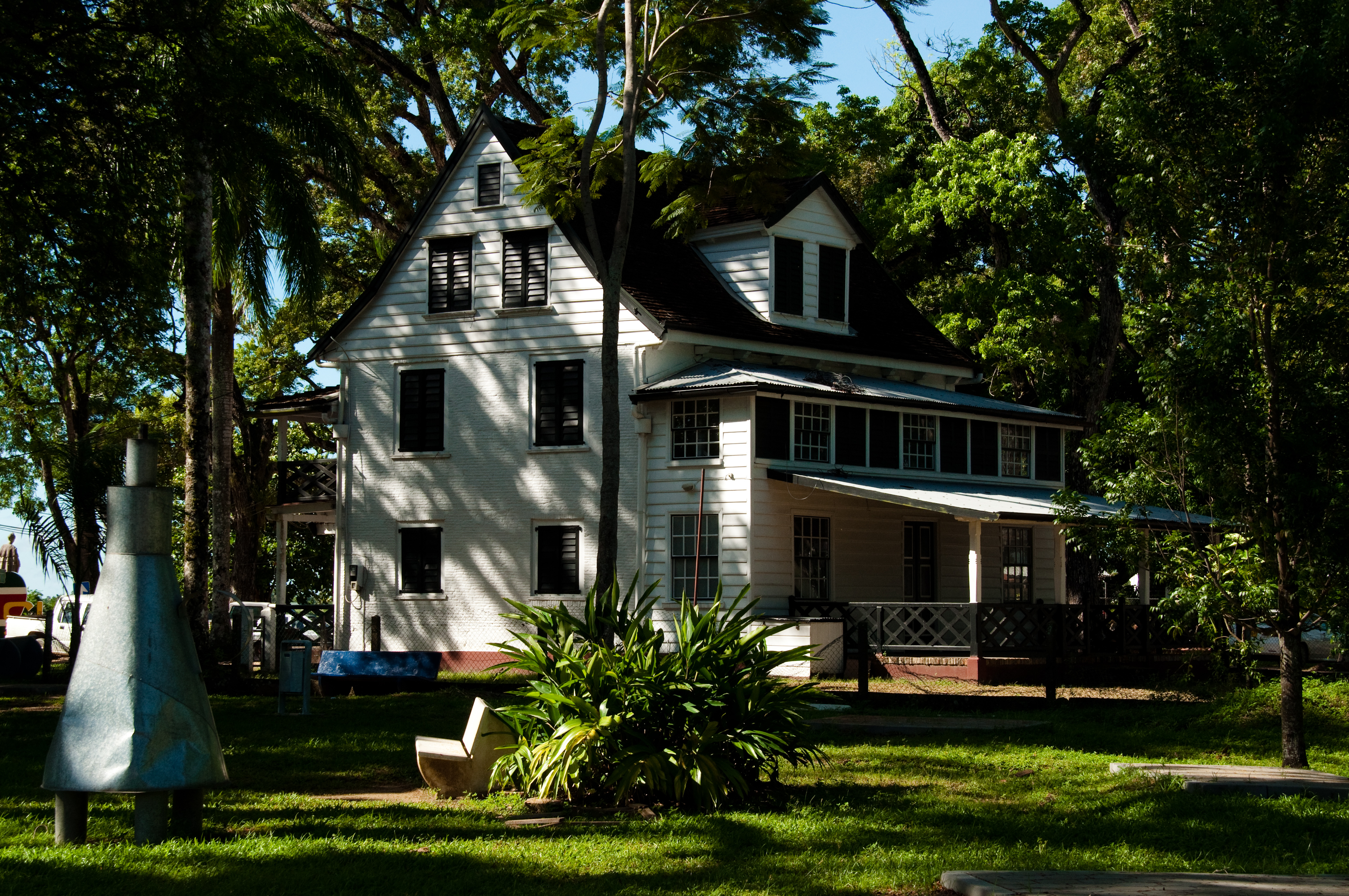
Officers' houses at Fort Zeelandia

Fort Zeelandia is a fortress in Paramaribo, Suriname. In 1640 the French built a wooden fort on the spot which, during British colonial period, was reinforced and became Fort Willoughby. It was taken by the Dutch in 1667 and renamed Fort Zeelandia.

== History ==
Surinam, a small English colony, was established in 1650 by Major Anthony Rowse on behalf of the governor of Barbados, Francis Willoughby. In 1651 the English reinforced the abandoned French fort near present-day Paramaribo, calling it Fort Willoughby.

In 1667 the Dutch Admiral Abraham Crijnssen captured Fort Willoughby from forces under Lieutenant-Governor William Byam. The battle lasted only three hours before British munitions were exhausted. Crijnssen renamed the captured fort Fort Zeelandia, creating the Dutch colony of Surinam. Crijnssen also recaptured the Essequibo-Pomeroon Colony.

Over the years, it started to become obsolete as a military asset and, in 1772, there were even plans to tear it down.

After Surinamese independence in 1975, under the military government of Dési Bouterse in the 1980s, Fort Zeelandia was the location of the "December murders" of 1982 and was used to hold and torture political prisoners.

The Surinamese Museum is located in Fort Zeelandia. The museum has a large collection of ethnographica. Its collections contain archeology, visual arts, colonial furniture, textiles and historical photos.

The Nola Hatterman Art Academy is located in the former commander's house.

== See also ==
- Fort Nieuw-Amsterdam
