= Pieter de Huybert =

Dutch politician and diplomat

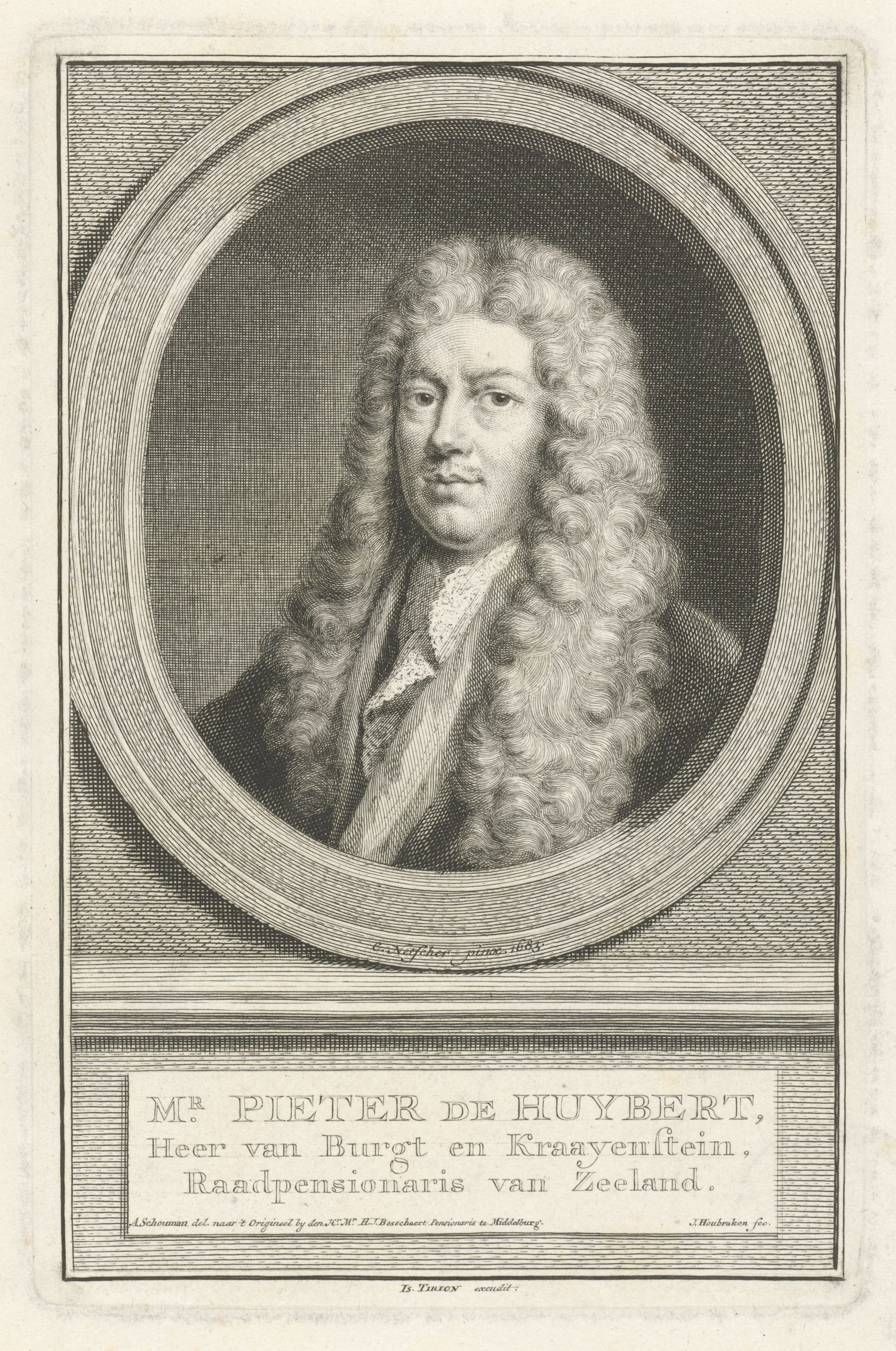
Pieter de Huybert (Note: Etching by Jacobus Houbraken after a painting by Caspar Netscher.)

Pieter de Huybert (Middelburg, 1 April 1622 - The Hague, 7 January 1697) was a Dutch politician and diplomat.

== Life ==
=== Personal life ===
De Huybert was a son of Johanna Haecx and Anthony Anthonyszoon de Huybert, a Middelburg merchant in Madder. He studied law at Leiden university, just like his nephew Justus de Huybert. He was first married with Anna Elisabeth van Panhuijs, and after being widowed, with Elisabeth de Hoochepied. He had two daughters: Clara Elisabeth and Petronella Genoveva, and at least one son: Antonie. Through inheritances and purchase he acquired the ambachtsheerlijkheid of Burgh and Kraaiesteijn, making him a lord of the manor. He had the church of the village built in 1674. He was buried in this church under a monument with his bust and an inscription from Daniel Gravius.

=== Career ===
De Huybert became a member of the Middelburg Vroedschap in March 1646. In this period he was used by the Dutch Republic as a diplomat, among others in Mechelen in the Spanish Netherlands (1652 and 1659); Sweden (1656-7); Polish–Lithuanian Commonwealth and Brandenburg-Prussia(1659-1660). He was appointed clerk of the States of Zeeland and of the Gecommitteerde Raden (Note: "Commissioned Councillors", the Executive of the States) on 24 March 1659. He held these posts until 15 December 1664, when he was succeeded by his nephew Justus. His next post was that of Grand pensionary of the States of Zeeland (and of the Gecommitteerde Raden at the same time), which he attained on 19 March 1664 (so there was an overlap with his previous function). He remained Grand pensionary until 9 October 1687. He became a member of the Raad van State of the Dutch Republic on 10 November 1687 until his death on 7 January 1697.

De Huybert (together with his nephew Justus) was instrumental in having William III recognized as First Noble (Note: This was one of the five members of the States of Zeeland, the other four being the voting cities of Middelburg, Goes, Zierikzee and Tholen. The First Noble represented the Zeeland nobility. He was normally the Prince of Orange as this worthy possessed the marquisates of Vlissingen and Veere. But William had been barred from this membership during the First Stadtholderless Period.) in 1668. He thereafter belonged to the Orangist faction in Zeeland and the Republic. (Note: De Huybert already in 1669 (so before the 1672 Orangist revolution) published a notorious Orangist pamphlet against the regime of Grand Pensionary Johan de Witt, entitled: Apologie tegen de algemeene en onbepaalde vrijheid voor de oude Hollandsche regeering (Apologia against the general and unlimited freedom for the old Dutch government).)

In 1672 both De Huyberts were drivers behind the naval expedition of Cornelis Evertsen the Youngest that would recapture New Netherland from the English in 1673.

== Sources ==
- Nagtglas, F. (1890). Levensberichten van Zeeuwen: Zijnde een vervolg op P. de la Rue, Geletterd, staatkundig en heldhaftig Zeeland (in Dutch). Vol. 1. J.C. & W. Altorffer. pp. 443–444.
- "dr. Pieter de Huybert". Repertorium ambtsdragers en ambtenaren 1428-1861 (in Dutch).
