= Justus de Huybert =

Dutch politician and diplomat

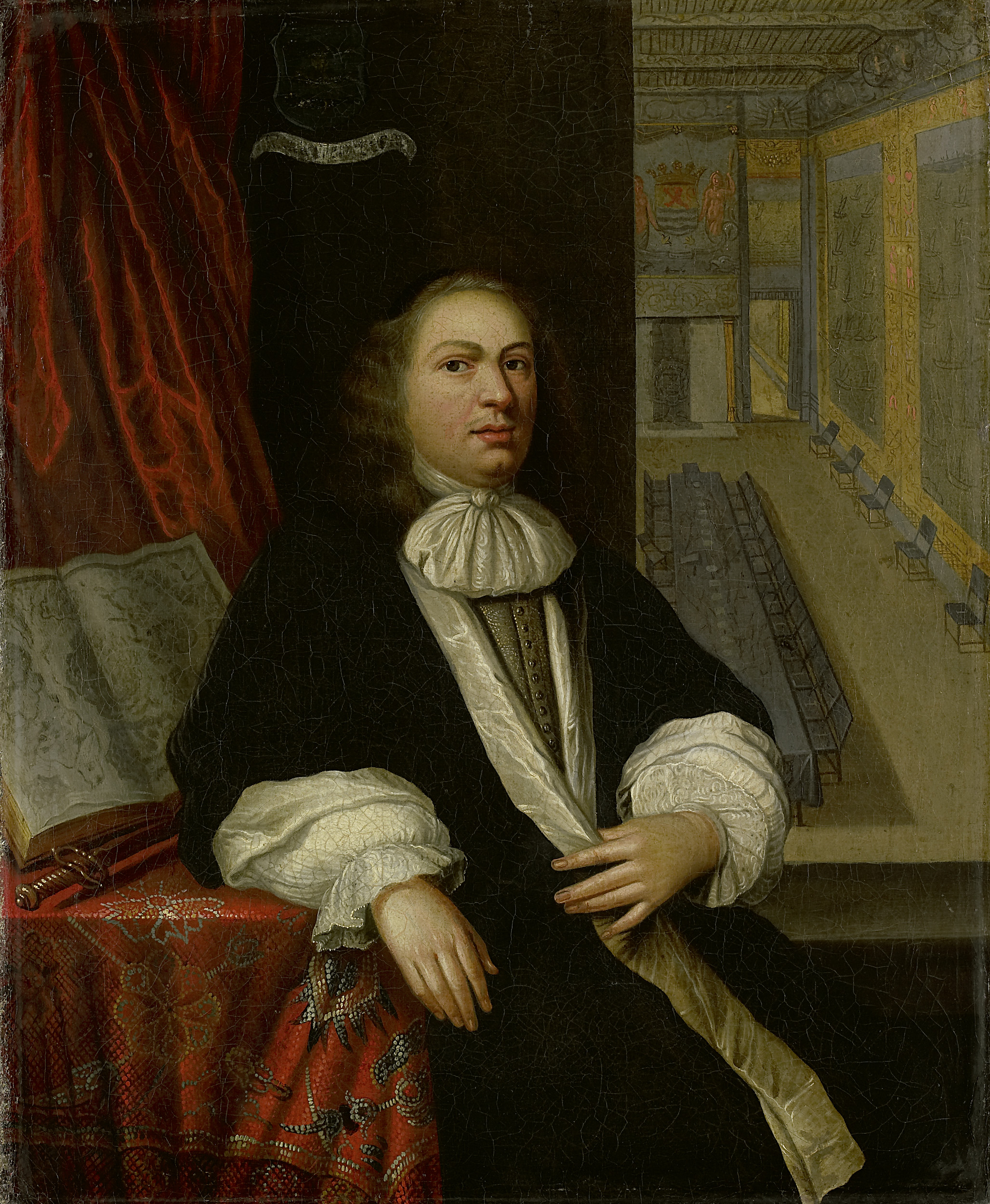
Justus de Huybert

Justus de Huybert (Zierikzee, 1610 - Zierikzee, 4 September 1682) was a Dutch politician and diplomat. He held offices of the States of Zeeland in the middle years of the 17th century.

== Life ==
=== Personal life ===
Justus (who was actually baptized Joos, after his grandfather) was the second son of the Zierikzee Regent Adriaan de Huybert, who held many positions in the government of the city of Zierikzee in the Zeeland province of the Dutch Republic, and Anthonetta Teellinck. He studied law at Leiden university. He married three times, with Anna Engelbrecht (1640), Levina Munniks, and Geertruida Vorstius (1676; after twice being widowed), and he had two daughters: Genoveva and Anthonia, and a son: Adriaan, from the first marriage.

=== Career ===
Justus was unable to become a member of the Vroedschap of the city of Zierikzee, because his father was already a member, but in 1645 he was appointed Schepen of the city. In 1649 followed an appointment as pensionary and clerk of the city.

In 1652 the States of Zeeland nominated him as an ambassador of the Dutch Republic to Denmark–Norway and Sweden. In 1660 he was sent together with Godard Adriaan van Reede, Coenraad van Beuningen, and Joan van Gendt in an embassy to France to conclude a new commerce treaty of the Dutch Republic with king Louis XIV of France, which ended with success in 1662.

After the death of the Zeeland Grand pensionary Adriaan Veth in 1663, the States of Zeeland commissioned De Huybert to draft a new instruction for the Grand pensionaries of the province, which he did in a week's time. The States next appointed him their Clerk (and that of the Gecommitteerde Raden of the province (Note: The Gecommitterde Raden, or Commissioned Councillors, acted as the Executive of the province.)) in 1664. He held this position until his death in 1682.

in 1668, together with his uncle Pieter de Huybert, the Grand pensionary of Zeeland, Justus promoted the acceptance of William III, the Prince of Orange, as First Noble of Zeeland, proving their Orangist credentials. (Note: The First Noble was one of the five members of the States of Zeeland, together with the voting cities of Middelburg, Goes, Zierikzee, and Tholen. The First Noble represented the Zeeland nobility. He was usually the Prince of Orange, as that worthy possessed the marquisates of Vlissingen and Veere. But William had been barred from the position during the First Stadtholderless Period.)

In 1672 both De Huyberts (Note: Justus de Huybert was secretary of the Board of the Admiralty of Zeeland.) were drivers behind the naval expedition of Cornelis Evertsen the Youngest that would recapture New Netherland from the English in 1673.

== Sources ==
- Aa, A. J. van der, ed. (1867). "Mr. Justus de Huybert". Biografisch Woordenboek der Nederlanden. Deel 8. Tweede stuk (DBNL) (in Dutch). pp. 1488–1489.
- Uil, H. "Mr. Justus de Huybert (1611-1682)". Zeeuwse Ankers (in Dutch).
