= William Byam =

British physician and philatelist (1882–1963)

- Born: 19 August 1882
- Died: 25 October 1963 (aged 81)
- Education: Wellington College, Berkshire
- Occupation: Physician
- Title: Dr
- Parent: William Byam

Lieutenant-Colonel William Byam OBE MRCS LRCP (19 August 1882 – 25 October 1963) was a British Harley Street physician whose home in Guernsey was occupied by the Germans during the Second World War. In his spare time, Byam was a noted philatelist who was added to the Roll of Distinguished Philatelists in 1949.

== Early life ==
Byam was the son of Emily née Bean and Major General William Byam who were married in Aden. William Byam junior was educated at Wellington College, Berkshire, and studied medicine at St George's Hospital, London.

== Royal Army Medical Corps ==
Byam entered the Royal Army Medical Corps in 1904 and reached the rank of lieutenant colonel.

He served in the Egyptian Army, 1908–16, including South East Sudan in 1912, for which he was awarded the Order 4th class Medjedieh. He was a member of the British Red Cross Unit to Bulgaria in 1912 for which he was awarded the Order 4th class St Alexander of Bulgaria, and the New Zealand Expeditionary Force, 1914–16, for which he was awarded the Order 3rd class Nile.

In his autobiography, The Road to Harley Street (1963), Byam described his army service during the First World War and his research into trench fever, conducted at the Hampstead Heart Hospital. Trench fever was a major cause of illness amongst soldiers during the war and the method of transmission was uncertain. Byam contributed a chapter on the condition to Lloyd's Lice and their Menace to Man (London, Hodder & Stoughton, 1919).

Byam developed a deep interest in Egypt during his service there, later even decorating a room in his Harley Street house in an Arab style. He donated the contents of that room, complete with hand-painted ceiling and wood panelling, to the Egyptian Embassy in London.

== Philately ==
Byam took up philately in 1923 as a method of relaxation from his stressful medical practice and joined the Royal Philatelic Society London (RPSL) in 1924. He decided to specialise in the philately of Egypt, a country he knew well, and founded the Egypt Study Circle in 1935. The Egypt circle was the first philatelic study circle to be established anywhere in the world and following a paper given to the 1938 Philatelic Congress of Great Britain titled "Organisation of a Study Circle", many other collectors were inspired to establish study circles in their own areas of specialism.

During the Second World War, Byam's home in Guernsey was requisitioned for the use of German officers, and all his philatelic trophies and medals were stolen. They were never recovered. Fortunately, Byam's stamp collection remained in England and was safe. It was sold by auction in 1961.

== Philatelic honours ==
Byam received many philatelic honours. In 1931 the RPSL awarded him the Tapling Medal for his research into the postage due stamps of Egypt and in 1956 the Tilleard Medal for his display of the 1872–75 postage stamps of that country. He also won nine gold medals at international philatelic exhibitions.

Byam was the first foreigner to be appointed a "Member of Honour" by the Societe Philatelique d'Egypte. He was a fellow of the Society of Postal Historians and president of the Oriental Philatelic Association of London.

== Death ==
Byam died 25 October 1963. He was survived by his wife and two of his daughters.

== Selected publications ==
- Trench Fever, a louse-borne disease. With … a Summary of the Report of the American Trench Fever Commission by Lieut. R.H. Vercoe. Henry Frowde; Hodder & Stoughton, London, 1919.
- Practice of medicine in the tropics, by many authorities.... (Editor with Robert George Archibald) (Three volumes)
- Dr Byam in Harley Street: An autobiography. Bles, London, 1962.
- The Road to Harley Street. Bles, London, 1963.
