= William Byam (colonialist) =

English colonial Governor of Suriname

Treasurer of Barbados
- In office 1649–1652

Governor of Surinam
- In office 1654 – 27 February 1667
- Preceded by: Anthony Rowse
- Succeeded by: Position abolished

Personal details
- Died: 1672 Antigua
- Profession: Colonial administrator, planter

William Byam (died 1672) was an English colonist, politician, and agriculturalist who lived during the periods of the English Civil Wars, Interregnum, and Restoration. He was active in English and Barbadian politics, and played a critical role in establishing and governing a short-lived English colony in what is now Suriname. The village of Braamspunt (a corruption of 'Byam's Point') is named after him.

== Early life, English Civil War, and Barbados ==
William Byam was born in the 1620s to a Somerset family. He was educated at Trinity College, Dublin.

Fighting on the side of the Royalists in the English Civil War, he was captured following the fall of Bridgwater to the Roundheads in 1645. Following this defeat he relocated to the Caribbean, like many other Cavaliers at the time.

Settling in Barbados, he was described as a "known malignant" by the Roundhead government in London.

Barbados had remained neutral in the civil war. However, the execution of Charles I of England brought this to an end. The now-dominant Royalist faction on the island (buttressed by the arrival of many exiles from Great Britain) took power in a coup and seized control of the Governor, Philip Bell. The Royalists forced the Governor to issue a declaration of loyalty to Charles II, surrender control of the island's arsenal, and the disarmament of all Roundheads on the island. During the coup and its aftermath, William Byam led a more extreme Royalist faction which had urged the execution of Royalists.

Parker became the island's treasurer, in which role his duties included responsibility for the island's arsenal and its defence.

In Autumn of 1651 the Parliamentary authorities in England dispatched a fleet commanded by Sir George Ayscue to bring the recalcitrant island to heel. This fleet blockaded Barbados, and eventually succeeded in landing forces on the island in the winter of 1651. The island's Royalist forces, led by Lord Willoughy were unable to drive them off. After several indecisive engagements, the Royalists eventually surrendered the island on terms.

Following the loss of Barbados, Willoughby and Byam traveled to Suriname to commence the development of the colony there, which Willoughby had been preparing as a possible alternative to Barbados.

== Surinam ==
Byam arrived in Surinam and quickly became the most powerful person in the colony (Lord Willoughby himself having returned to Europe), styling himself as a "colonel". However, in the initial years there was no clear leadership in English Suriname, and it was not until 1657 that the inhabitants had created a militia, a colonial assembly of twenty-one persons selected by the wealthier inhabitants of the colony, and a gubernatorial office. Initially the position of governor was annually elective, and Byam succeeded in securing election to the position in 1657, by which time he was in his mid-thirties. He was re-elected in 1658 and 1659.

As Byam's tenure as governor wore on he was able to use his position to create an influence body of supporters, and punished and forced the exile of leading individuals and factions who were hostile to his position.

Byam is known to have personally owned two plantations in Surinam.

He features as a character in Oroonoko, by Aphra Behn, which is set in Suriname. Behn and Byam had met during the former's visit to the colony in 1663–64, and they corresponded afterwards. Byam eventually organised Behn's removal from the colony, following their falling out. Braamspunt in Suriname is a corruption of Byam's Point named after William Byam.

== Loss of Surinam ==
Following the outbreak of the Second Anglo-Dutch War, the Dutch deployed a force under Admiral Abraham Crijnssen to capture Surinam. Crijnssen's force arrived at the mouth of the Suriname River on 25 February 1667, and had Fort Willoughby under riverine bombardment and siege by the next day. Byam was in command of the fort, which controlled access to the rest of the colony. Under sustained assault, Byam surrendered the fort on terms to Dutch. Since the trading colony's access to the Atlantic was dependent upon control of the river, the loss of the fort effectively meant the loss of the colony, and the English inhabitants either fled or defected to the Dutch en masse.

Following his surrender of the colony, Byam was court-martialled for cowardice, but avoided conviction.

The Treaty of Breda, which brought an end to the war, was largely on the basis of uti possidetis, and saw Surinam ceded. The English never regained sovereignty over Suriname, and Byam's authority in the area duly disintegrated.

== Later life ==
Following the fall of Surinam to the Dutch and its final abandonment by obstinate English planters, Byam travelled to Antigua, a more settled English colony. There he sought to "hew a new fortune out of woods". In this he was successful, securing marriage for his sons into a powerful local family (the Warners), and thereby establishing one of the richest and longest-lasting sugar families. He died in 1672.
