= Anthony Rowse =

First colonial Governor of Suriname

Governor of Surinam
- In office 1650–1654
- Preceded by: Office established
- Succeeded by: William Byam

Anthony Rowse was the first Colonial Governor of Suriname during English suzerainty. Sir Thomas Modyford, 1st Baronet mentions his starting an English settlement on the Suriname River. In 1650 reportedly landed in Suriname with around 300 people. That said as the effort had been initiated by Baron Francis Willoughby it would later be known as Willoughby-Land. Once there Rowse is said to have negotiated with two "Carib kings or princes."
