= Surinam (English colony) =

Short-lived early English colony in South America

Coordinates: 5°51′N 55°12′W

Colony of Surinam
- 1650–1667
- Flag
- Status: Colony of the Kingdom of England
- Capital: Paramaribo
- Common languages: English (official); Akurio, Arawak-Lokono, Carib-Kari'nja, Sikiana-Kashuyana, Tiro-Tiriyó, Waiwai, Warao, Wayana
- Religion: Christianity; Native American religions
- Government: Constitutional monarchy
- Governor
  - 1650–1654: Anthony Rowse
  - 1654–1667: William Byam
- Legislature: House of Burgesses
- History
  - Established: 1650
  - Disestablished: 1667
- Currency: Pound sterling Spanish dollar
Preceded by	Succeeded by
Indigenous peoples in Suriname	Surinam (Dutch colony)
- Today part of: Suriname

Surinam, also known as Willoughbyland, was a short-lived early English colony in South America in what is now Suriname. It was founded in 1650 by Lord Willoughby when he was the Royalist Governor of Barbados.

== History ==
In 1598 Lawrence Kemys, leading an expedition to the Guianas on behalf of Walter Raleigh, passed a river he called "Shurinama". In 1613, a short-lived Dutch trading post had been established inside the mouth of the Suriname River, near an Amerindian village called "Parmurbo". In 1630, British settlers made the first European attempt at colonization at Marshall's Creek, a tributary of the Suriname. The Dutch navigator David Pietersz. de Vries wrote of traveling up the "Sername" river in 1634 until he encountered the English colony there, which did not last much longer.

In 1650, Lord Francis Willoughby, a Parliamentarian turned Royalist, had been appointed Governor of Barbados by the exiled King Charles II. In view of his precarious position, he planned to settle an alternative colony in Suriname, beyond the reach of the Parliamentarians. He therefore at his own personal cost equipped a ship of 20 guns, and two smaller vessels, with the things necessary for the support of a new plantation. Although Major Anthony Rowse actually established the colony in Willoughby's name, Willoughby himself went there in person two years later and further furnished it with things requisite for defence and trade.

The English colony consisted of around 30,000 acres (120 km^{2}) and a fort originally built by the French, Fort Willoughby. In 1663 there were some 50 sugar plantations on which most of the work was done by indigenous Indians and 3,000 African slaves. There were around 1,000 white settlers, who had been joined by Brazilian Jews attracted by the religious freedom granted to all settlers by the English.

The colony was administered by an assembly of twenty-one men chosen by and from the colony's wealthier male landowners, and a six-man council appointed by the governor. The governor and council administered justice and proposed measures – such as raising money for defence or building a prison – which would then be voted on by the assembly, who would meet every few months, usually in one of the larger plantation houses.

But the colony had already passed its high point. The 1660 Restoration of the Monarchy in England was the cause of much unrest in Surinam.

Willoughby himself, who had been relieved of his Governorship of Barbados by the Parliamentarians and returned to England, was in 1662 restored to the governorship of Barbados and given the proprietorship of some of the 'Charibbee' islands and of Surinam.

== Chief Justice ==
Part of his Royal grant gave Willoughby or his appointee responsibility to administer justice, including the death penalty. According to Matthew Parker, "It seems that Willoughby himself, and his establishment in Suriname, was above the law. Wasn't this the mistake that Charles I had made and had been punished for?"

Plans had been drawn up by Parliament almost a month before Charles II's arrival at Dover, that sheriffs, mayors, constables and the like should continue in their duties in the King's name. Rumours of this reached Byam in Suriname at the same time as he learnt of the restoration of the King. Byam then falsely claimed to have received a similar order to keep in his post, although there was only one month left of his year's tenure.

== Final years ==
The Second Anglo-Dutch War broke out in March 1665. Willoughby was drowned around late July 1666 off Guadeloupe, when his fleet was destroyed in a hurricane.

When the English attacked the Dutch settlements in 1667, Surinam was captured by the Dutch Admiral Abraham Crijnssen and the main settlement renamed Fort Zeelandia. Five months later the settlement was recaptured by an English fleet led by Admiral Sir John Harman. It remained in English hands until news of the Treaty of Breda signed in July had reached the settlement only weeks later, and that it would be returned to the Dutch. Surinam was de facto exchanged for New Amsterdam, now New York City, under the terms of the Treaty of Westminster seven years later.

After the Third Anglo-Dutch War, the English population was evacuated. King Charles II sent a Commission of Edward Cranfield, Captain Edward Dickinson, and Mark Brent to oversee the relocation of the settlers, their slaves, and their possessions to Jamaica. The commissioners arrived in June 1675 and by early September they dropped off approximately 1100 people using three ships, HMS Hunter, HMS Hercules, and HMS American. There was a diplomatic incident on whether Jewish settlers would be allowed to leave. The Dutch wanted the wealthy Jewish planters to remain in the colony to help the economy, but in the end, the Jews were allowed to evacuate along with the English.
