= Abraham Crijnssen =

Dutch admiral

Admiral Abraham Crijnssen

Governor of Suriname
- In office 1668 – 1 February 1669
- Preceded by: Samuel Barry
- Succeeded by: Philip Lichtenberg

Personal details
- Born: Vlissingen, Dutch Republic
- Died: 1 February 1669; Paramaribo, Surinam

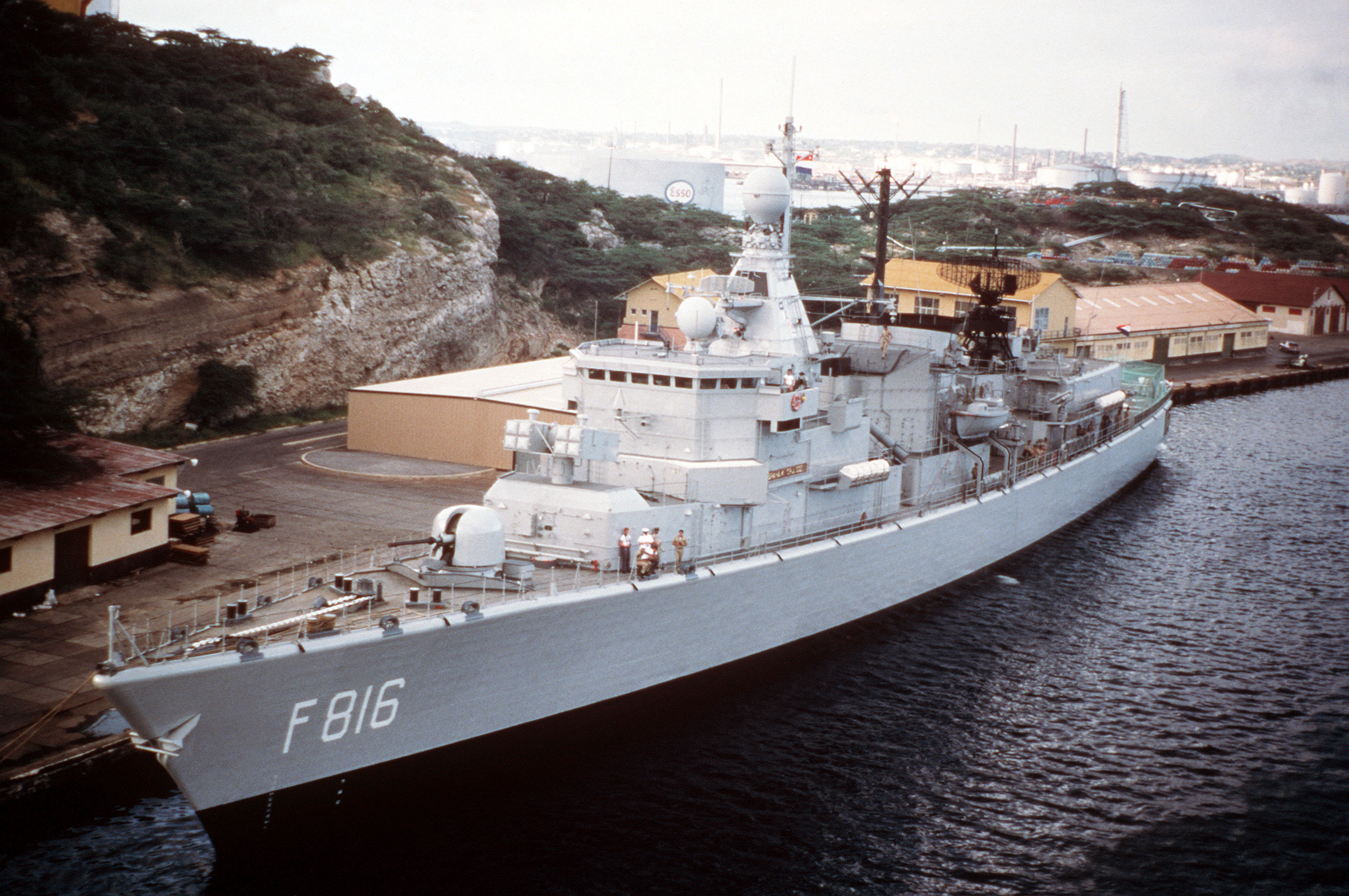
A port bow view of Kortenaer-class frigate HNLMS Abraham Crijnssen tied at the refueling pier.

Abraham Crijnssen (died 1 February 1669) was a Dutch naval commander, notable for capturing the English colony in Suriname in 1667 during the Second Anglo-Dutch War, resulting in the establishment of a long-term colony under Dutch control. The minesweeper HNLMS Abraham Crijnssen and the frigate HNLMS Abraham Crijnssen have been named after him.

== Life ==
=== 1632–1665 ===
Crijnssen (also written as Krijnssen) was probably born in Vlissingen. His date of birth is unknown. In 1632 he commanded the Samson and the Vlissingen, two ships belonging to a fleet of 12 privateers owned by the brothers Lampsins. Crijnssen inflicted much damage on the Dunkirk Privateers, and distinguished himself in 1639 during the Battle of the Downs.

In 1665, he was commander at the Admiralty of Zeeland. First he served as first captain under Adriaan Banckert, but in the autumn he was appointed captain of Prins te Paard. He fought at the Four Days' Battle and the St. James's Day Battle as commander of the frigate Zeelandia.

=== Suriname ===
In December 1666, Crijnssen received the command over a squadron, composed of the frigates Zeelandia, West-Cappelle and Zeeridder, and four smaller ships, including Prins te Paard. He was sent to the West Indies and the east coast of North America in an expedition against the English.

Crijnssen left Veere on 30 December with 700 men aboard, including more than 200 soldiers. On 25 February 1667 he reached the Suriname River where the English Fort Willoughby was situated. After a short bombardment the English surrendered the fort and on 6 March they gave up the entire colony. The plantation owners could remain and were granted equal citizenship, if they swore alliance to the States of Zeeland. Crijnssen renamed the fort Fort Zeelandia and left a garrison behind. West-Capelle captured the English frigate York, and sailed back to Zeeland in October 1667 with 1,000 pounds (450 kg) of elephant teeth taken from York.

=== Tobago, Sint-Eustatius, Martinique ===
On 17 April Crijnssen had already left to liberate the Dutch colonies of Berbice, Essequibo and Pomeroon, but upon arrival he learned that the English had already been expelled. He then sailed to Tobago and found the fort destroyed. After rebuilding it and leaving a garrison, he sailed on 4 May to Sint Eustatius, which he reconquered. He then headed for Martinique where he joined forces with a French fleet to face a strong English force near the island of Nevis. He was forced to abandon the battle because of poor collaboration between the Dutch and the French.

=== Virginia ===
After this battle, Crijnssen sailed to Virginia, where he surprised in the mouth of the James River an English commercial fleet, ready to cross the ocean with a cargo of tobacco. During the Battle of The James River (1667) he captured the English escort warship, spread his men over 11 merchant ships, and burned the rest. He then sailed back to Vlissingen with his prizes, where he arrived on 25 August. Crijnssen received a hero's welcome and received a golden chain.

=== Suriname recaptured ===
In February 1668, Crijnssen was sent back to Suriname with three ships. Despite the fact that the Treaty of Breda (1667) had given Surinam to the Dutch, the English had retaken Fort Zeelandia (Fort Willoughby) in October 1667. Crijnssen arrived in Suriname on 20 April, and by 28 April the whole of Suriname was firmly back in Dutch hands. Crijnssen remained as acting governor of Suriname until his death on 1 February 1669. He was replaced by Philip Lichtenberg. The colony was to remain a Dutch possession until 1975.

== Bibliography ==
- Benjamins, Herman Daniël; Snelleman, Johannes (1917). Encyclopaedie van Nederlandsch West-Indië (in Dutch). Leiden: Martinus Nijhoff Publishers.
