= Provincial Council of Zeeland =

Provincial council in Zeeland, Netherlands

Provincial Council of Zeeland Provinciale Staten van Zeeland

Type
- Type: Provincial council

Leadership
- President: Hugo de Jonge (CDA)
- Secretary: Flora van Houwelingen

Structure
- Seats: 39
- Political groups: Government (21): BBB (7); SGP (5); CDA (5); VVD (4); Opposition (18): GL–PvdA (6); PvZ (4); PVV (2); FvD (1); SP (1); D66 (1); PvdD (1); JA21 (1); CU (1)

Elections
- Last election: 15 March 2023
- Next election: No later than March 2027

Meeting place
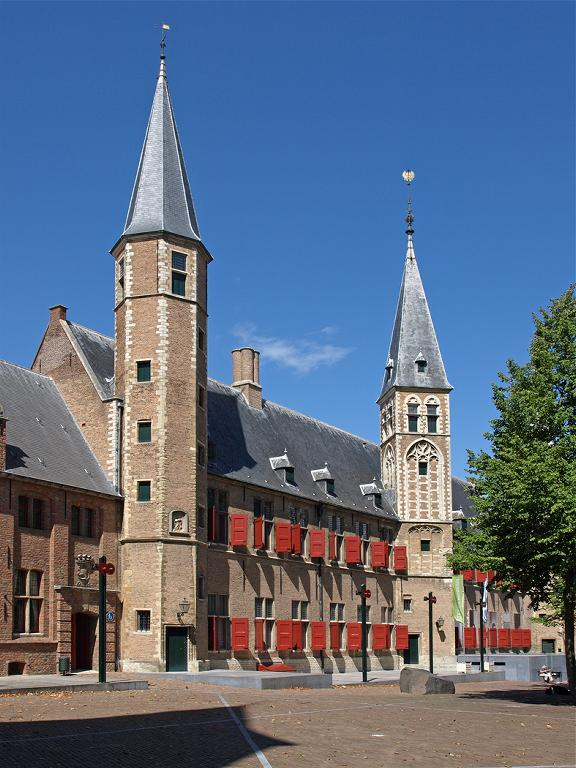
- Meeting place of the Provincial Council of Zeeland in Middelburg

Website
- www.zeeland.nl/bestuur/provinciale-staten

The Provincial Council of Zeeland (Dutch: Provinciale Staten van Zeeland), also known as the States of Zeeland, is the provincial council of Zeeland, Netherlands. It forms the legislative body of the province. Its 39 seats are distributed every four years in provincial elections.

== History ==
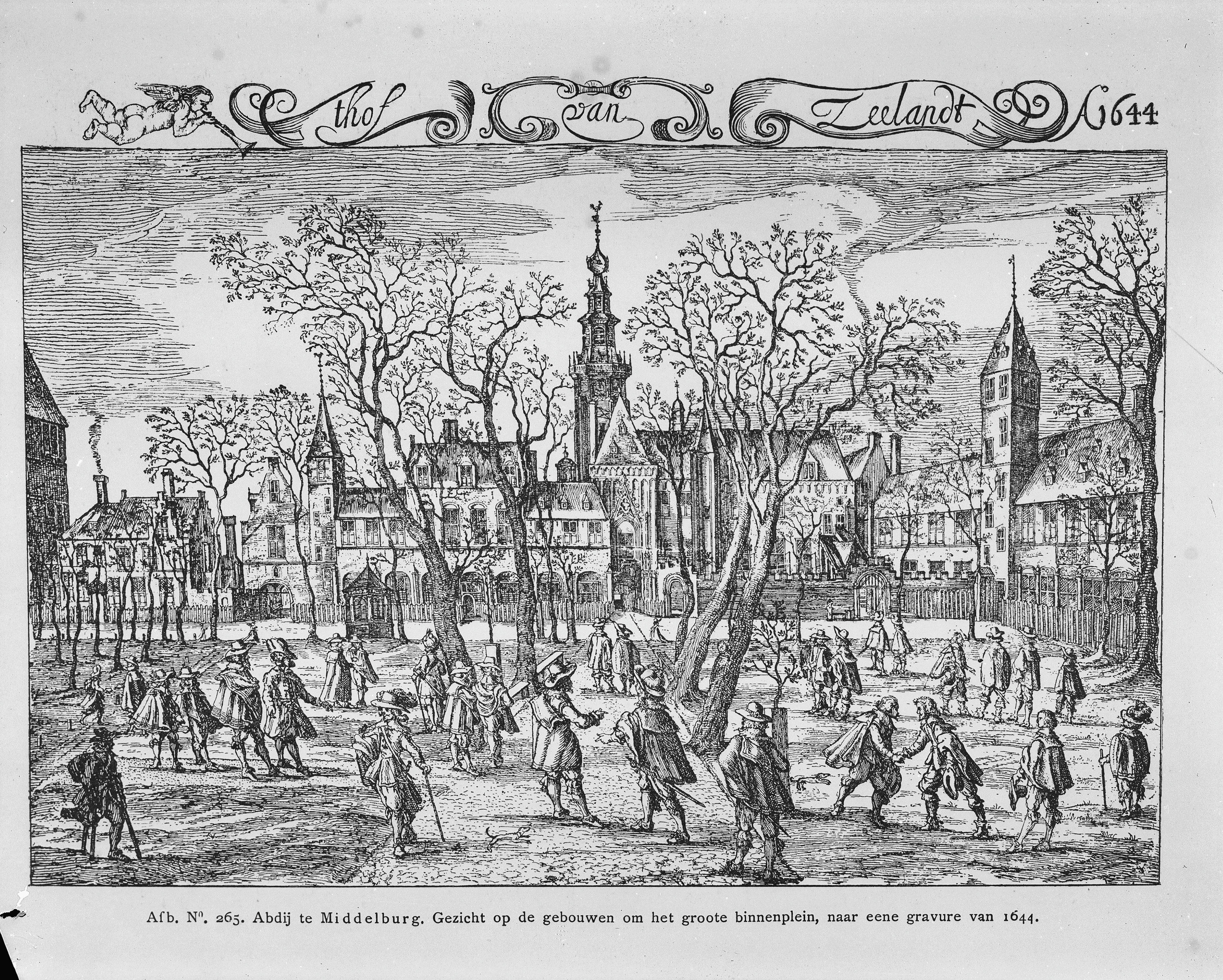
The Court of Zeeland in 1644

During the rule of Charles V, the States of Zeeland was made up of prelates from the province (e.g. the abbot of the Middelburg Abbey), the main nobles of Zeeland (the Ridderschap) and representatives of the province's six largest cities (known as pensionaries). These cities were Middelburg, Zierikzee, Goes, Reimerswaal and Tholen (with Vlissingen and Veere added after the Dutch Revolt). Decisions were taken by majority vote and the body and province were represented at the States General of the Netherlands by the Grand Pensionary of Zeeland, with this regional states (like the others) also nominating Zeeland's delegates to the States-General. Its executive board was known as the Gecommitteerde Raden. From 1578, these, the Zeeuwse Admiraliteitscollege and other regional representatives oversaw the Admiralty of Zeeland.

After the French period, the provincial council was re-established on 29 August 1814. The first session took place on 19 September of that year. The council consisted of 20 members representing the cities, 18 representing the rural estate and 6 representing the nobility. The 1850 Provinces Act abolished the estate-based representation, with the council's 42 members henceforth directly elected by the enfranchised segment of the population across multi-member electoral districts.

== Current composition ==
Since the 2023 provincial elections, the distribution of seats of the Provincial Council of Zeeland has been as follows:

Party	Votes	%	+/–	Seats	+/–
Farmer–Citizen Movement	36,100	19.76	New	9	New
Labour Party – GroenLinks	24,537	13.43	–0.82	6	0
Reformed Political Party	22,692	12.42	+0.36	5	–1
Christian Democratic Appeal	20,892	11.43	–4.84	5	–2
People's Party for Freedom and Democracy	16,294	8.92	–1.36	4	0
Party for Freedom	8,707	4.77	–1.47	2	0
Party for Zeeland	8,458	4.63	–1.58	2	0
Christian Union	7,861	4.30	–0.92	1	–1
Democrats 66	7,171	3.92	+0.17	1	0
JA21	6,287	3.44	New	1	New
Party for the Animals	6,287	3.44	–0.06	1	0
Socialist Party	6,034	3.30	–1.52	1	–1
Forum for Democracy	5,460	2.99	–8.81	1	–4
50PLUS	2,872	1.57	–3.56	0	–2
General Water Board Party	1,621	0.89	New	0	New
BVNL	1,434	0.78	New	0	New
Total	182,707	100.00	–	39	–
Valid votes	182,707	99.55			
Invalid votes	400	0.22			
Blank votes	434	0.24			
Total votes	183,541	100.00			
Registered voters/turnout	294,064	62.42	+3.27		
Source: Kiesraad

== See also ==
- States of Holland and West Friesland
- Provincial politics in the Netherlands
