= De Zeven Provinciën-class frigate =

Dutch air-defence and command frigates

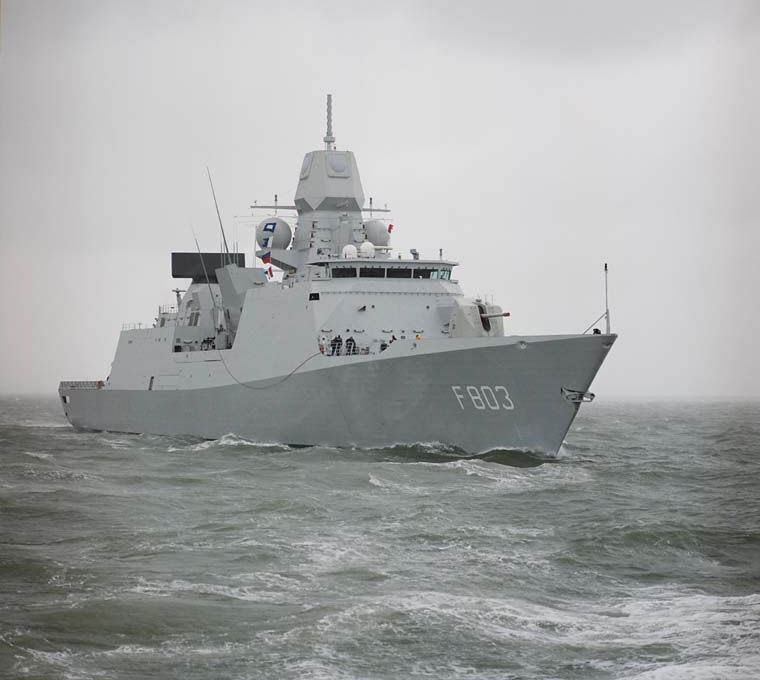
- HNLMS Tromp

Class overview
- Name: De Zeven Provinciën class
- Builders: Damen Schelde Naval Shipbuilding
- Operators: Royal Netherlands Navy
- Preceded by: Tromp class; Jacob van Heemskerck class
- Succeeded by: Future Air Defender
- Cost: ~€1.9 billion program cost
- Built: 1998–2005
- In commission: 2002–present
- Completed: 4
- Active: 4

General characteristics
- Type: Air-defense and command frigate
- Displacement: 6,050 tonnes (full load)
- Length: 144.24 m (473 ft 3 in)
- Beam: 18.80 m (61 ft 8 in)
- Draught: 5.18 m (17 ft 0 in)
- Installed power: 4 × Wärtsilä-Deutz D620 V12 diesel-generators, 1,680 kW (2,250 hp) each
- Propulsion: Combined diesel or gas; 2 × Wärtsilä 16 V26 marine diesel engines, 5.1 MW (6,800 hp) each; 2 × Rolls-Royce Marine Spey SM 1A gas turbines, 19.5 MW (26,100 hp) each; 2 × propeller shafts, 5-bladed controllable pitch propellers
- Speed: 30 knots (56 km/h; 35 mph)
- Range: 4,000 nmi (7,400 km; 4,600 mi) at 18 knots (33 km/h; 21 mph)
- Complement: 30 officers, 202 ratings
- Sensors & processing systems: Thales Nederland SMART-L long-range air and surface surveillance radar; Thales Nederland APAR air and surface search, tracking and guidance radar (I band); DECCA NAV navigation radar; Thales Nederland Scout (Low-probability-of-intercept) surface search/navigation radar; Thales Nederland Sirius IRST long-range infrared surveillance and tracking system; Thales Nederland Mirador optical surveillance and tracking system; Atlas Elektronik DSQS-24C hull-mounted sonar; MK XII IFF system
- Electronic warfare & decoys: 2 × Thomson Racal Sabre ECM suite; 4 × Sippican Hycor SRBOC Mk 36 launcher; 1 × AN/SLQ-25 Nixie torpedo decoy
- Armament: Guns: 1 × Oto Melara 127 mm/64 dual-purpose gun; 2–4 × Browning M2 12.7 mm machine guns; 4–6 × FN MAG 7.62 mm machine guns; 2 × Goalkeeper CIWS; Missiles: 40-cell Mk 41 strike-length vertical launching system; SM-2 IIIA surface-to-air missiles (typically 32 carried); Evolved SeaSparrow missiles (quad-packed, typically 32 carried); Tomahawk cruise missiles.; 8 × Harpoon anti-ship missiles; 2 × twin Mk 32 Mod 9 torpedo launchers with Mk 46 Mod 5 torpedoes
- Aircraft carried: 1 × NH90 NFH helicopter
- Aviation facilities: Hangar and flight deck for 1 medium-sized helicopter

The De Zeven Provinciën class is a ship class of four air-defence and command frigates (Dutch: Luchtverdedigings- en commandofregatten; LCF) that are in service with the Royal Netherlands Navy. The ships are similar to the German Sachsen-class frigates in role and mission, and use the same sensors and armament for the air defence task.

== Design ==
=== Anti-aircraft warfare ===
These ships were optimized for anti-aircraft warfare and command. For this role the ships are equipped with an advanced sensor and weapons suite. The primary sensors for this role are the long range surveillance radar SMART-L and the multifunction radar Active Phased Array Radar (APAR). The SMART-L and APAR are highly complementary, in the sense that SMART-L is a D band radar providing very long range surveillance while APAR is an I band radar providing precise target tracking, a highly capable horizon search capability, and missile guidance using the Interrupted Continuous Wave Illumination (ICWI) technique, thus allowing guidance of 32 semi-active radar homing missiles in flight simultaneously, including 16 in the terminal guidance phase. The primary anti-aircraft weapons are the point defence Evolved Sea Sparrow Missile and the area defence RIM-66 Standard Missile (SM-2) Block IIIA. The Mk 41 Vertical Launching System is used to house and launch these missiles. 32 Evolved Sea Sparrow Missile and 32 Standard Missile SM-2 Block IIIA are carried.

=== Ballistic missile defence ===
The Royal Netherlands Navy (RNN) investigated the use of these ships for the role of ballistic missile defence (BMD). During tests carried out by HNLMS Tromp in the Pacific Ocean near Hawaii, experimental modifications to the SMART-L to allow even longer range were proven. A study by the RNN, the Netherlands Defence Material Organization, Thales Nederland, Raytheon Missile Systems, Johns Hopkins University Applied Physics Laboratory, and Lockheed Martin was conducted to establish the feasibility of modifying the De Zeven Provinciën class to provide it the capability to intercept ballistic missiles. In particular, the study examined the feasibility of integrating the SM-3 Block IB missile with the SMART-L and APAR radars. The study concluded that – with certain modifications to the SMART-L and APAR, as well as to the ship's Combat Management System and the missile itself – BMD with the De Zeven Provinciën class could be achieved. During a 2015 very large NATO military exercise the BMD capabilities were proven, the sensor suite discovered ballistic targets, and the ship destroyed them using both its own surface-to-air missiles, as well as using a U.S. Navy destroyer's missiles, by providing target data and missile guidance.

=== Surface and subsurface warfare ===
As noted above, these ships were optimized for anti-aircraft warfare, but they also have weapons on-board capable of performing anti-surface and anti-submarine warfare, for example: the RGM-84F Harpoon missile and Mark 46 torpedoes. In a new defense Study published by the Dutch government in March 2018, it was stated the frigates will receive a new surface-to-surface missile to succeed the Harpoon Block 1D.

Proposals to equip the De Zeven Provinciën-class frigates with a total of 32 BGM-109 Tomahawk (8 per ship) cruise missiles were evaluated, but these were shelved in May 2005. In 2023 new plans were unveiled equipping the frigates with Tomahawk land-attack missiles and ordered in 2024.

== Modernization ==
In late 2011, the Ministry of Defence announced a modernization program to upgrade the SMART-L early-warning radar so that De Zeven Provinciën-class frigates can detect and track ballistic missiles at extended range. In June 2012 a contract was signed with Thales to modify the four SMART-L radars aboard the frigates. This modernization program is scheduled for completion by late 2017 for the entire De Zeven Provinciën class.

On 3 May 2018, the Dutch Secretary of Defence, Barbara Visser, informed the Dutch national parliament that the evolved sea sparrow missile (ESSM) aboard the De Zeven Provinciën-class frigates will be upgraded from block 1 to block 2. This upgrade will be completed by 2024 and will allow the frigates to deal with the growing threat of modern anti-ship missiles. ESSM Block 2 allows the four frigates to defend against missiles that have greater speed, agility and perform unexpected movements. The current Harpoon surface-to-surface missile (SSM) will also be replaced with a new SSM by 2024. Furthermore, the current Otobreda 127/54 Compact naval gun will be replaced with the Otobreda 127/64 naval gun. The new naval gun will be able to fire multiple types of ammunition, including Vulcano (Note: On 3 April 2003 the Dutch Ministry of Defence signed a memorandum of understanding with the Italian Ministry of Defence to establish the need for long range munition and to develop this munition, which was named Vulcano, together for the Otobreda 127mm naval gun.) long range guided ammunition. The project costs between €100 million and €250 million, and will be take place between 2018 and 2023. Lastly, the Goalkeepers will be upgraded to a new version and all ships will have two installed as originally designed, they will eventually be replaced after 2025 by a new system. The systems that will be replacing the goalkeeper will be the RIM-116 Rolling Airframe Missile and the OTO Melara 76 mm naval gun, the specific type of the last mentioned system is not clearly stated.

In 2019, it was announced by the Dutch Ministry of Defence that the De Zeven Provinciën-class frigates would be kept in service five years longer, with the first frigate retiring in 2032 and the last in 2035. It was also decided to modernize the frigates to keep them up to date and better able to deal with electronic warfare. As a result, the frigates will be equipped with passive observation equipment for electromagnetic signals, which would allow the ships to detect threats quickly. Furthermore, the two frigates that will stay in service the longest will be also be equipped with jammers and ESSM Block 2 missiles. The other frigates will not be equipped with ESSM block 2 missiles as the new APAR radar that is needed to guide the missiles will arrive too late. The modernization will start in 2024 when the first frigate is planned to undergo major maintenance. A simulator will also be developed together with TNO, which will be used to tune the new equipment and to train and educate crew members.

In the Defensienota 2022, it was announced that the De Zeven Provinciën-class frigates will be equipped with cruise missiles and missiles that can disable ballistic missiles in space.

In April 2026 it was reported that all four De Zeven Provinciën class frigates will be equipped with a floating decoy system.

== Service history ==
=== Live missile firings ===
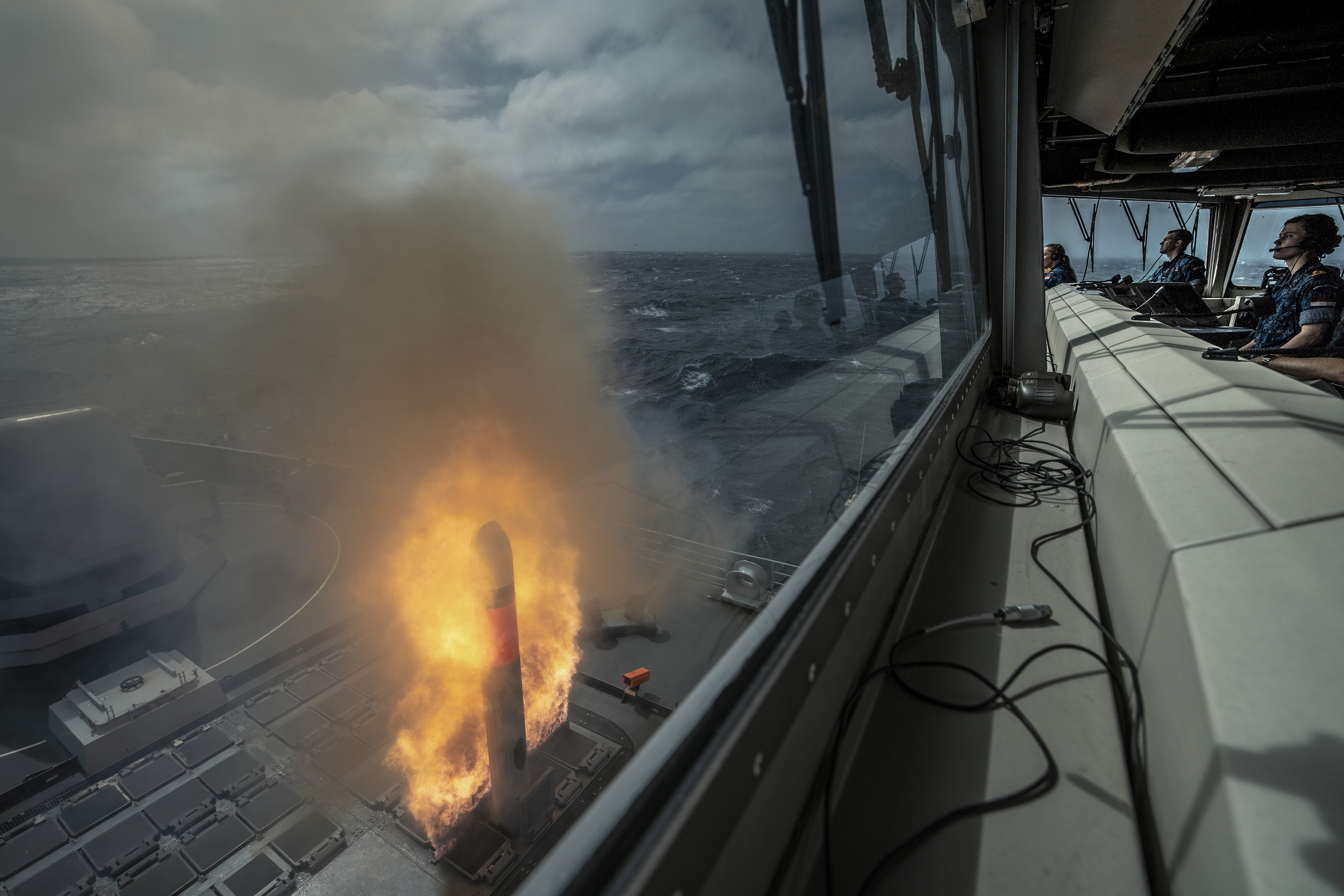
HNLMS De Ruyter launches a Tomahawk missile off the coast of Norfolk, VA (11 March 2025)

In November 2003, some 200 nautical miles (370 km; 230 mi) from the Azores, the missile guidance capabilities were tested with live firings for the first time. The firings involved the firing of a single ESSM and a single SM-2ER Block IIIA. These firings were the first ever live firings involving a full-size ship-borne active electronically scanned array (i.e., APAR) guiding missiles using the ICWI technique in an operational environment. As related by Jane's Navy International:

During the tracking and missile-firing tests, target profiles were provided by Greek-built EADS/3Sigma Iris PVK medium-range subsonic target drones. [...] According to the RNLN, ... APAR immediately acquired the missile and maintained track until destruction". [...] These ground-breaking tests represented the world's first live verification of the ICWI technique.

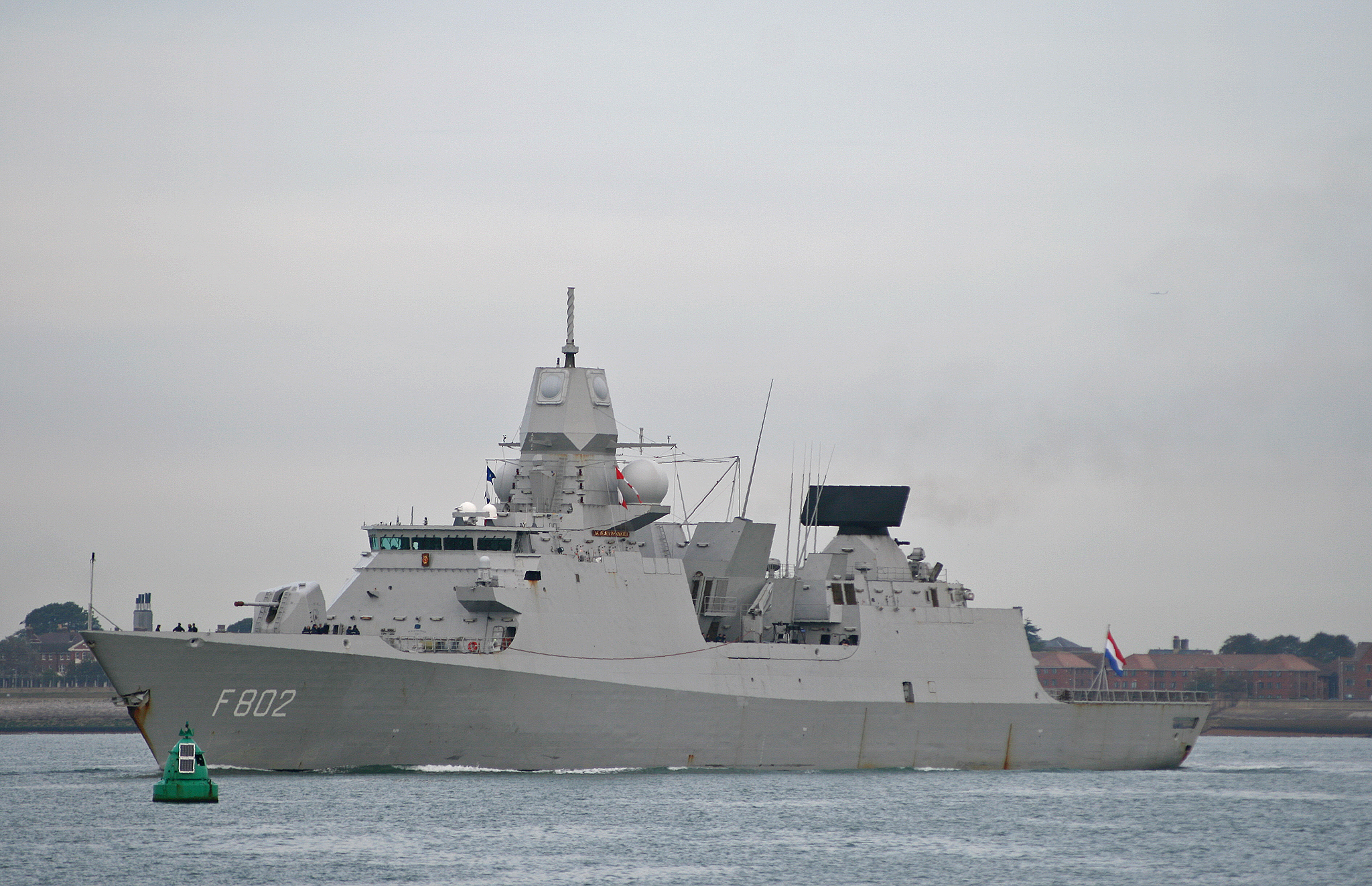
HNLMS De Zeven Provinciën outward bound from Portsmouth Naval Base, UK, on 21 September 2009

Further live firings were performed in March 2005, again in the Atlantic Ocean some 180 nautical miles (330 km) west of the Azores. The tests involved three live-firing events including firing a single SM-2 Block IIIA at an Iris target drone at long range, a single ESSM at an Iris target drone, and a two-salvo launch (with one salvo comprising two SM-2 Block IIIAs and the other comprising two ESSMs) against two incoming Iris target drones. The long-range SM-2 engagement apparently resulted in an intercept at a range of greater than 100 km (62 mi) from the ship, with a missile-target miss distance of 2.4 m (7 ft 10 in) (the warhead's proximity fuse having been disabled for the purposes of the test).

During the military exercise Formidable Shield 2021, HNLMS De Zeven Provinciën detected and tracked a ballistic missile with Thales-made SMART-L MM radar and relayed the target information to USS Paul Ignatius for SM-3 engagement. With this activity, the Netherlands becomes the only European country that can simultaneously scan the airspace beyond the atmosphere and space up to 2,000 km (1,200 mi) for air threats.

In March 2025, a successful test-fire of a Tomahawk missile was executed on a range of the US Navy on the East-Coast, near Norfolk

=== Counterpiracy operations ===
Ships of the De Zeven Provinciën class have been involved in counter-piracy operations off the Horn of Africa. The untraditional target set (i.e., small slow-moving or even static surface targets) can apparently be challenging for doppler radars designed to take on "high end" threats. However, according to Jane's International Defence Review:

[The RNLN has] reported great success using tailored surface-search software for the APAR sets fitted to the De Zeven Provinciën-class frigates deployed on antipiracy roles. By sacrificing some of APAR's high-end antiaircraft warfare capabilities, which were deemed unnecessary for the antipiracy role, its performance and resolution were improved in the surface-search role.

== Export ==
In June 2013, it was reported that Brazil was showing interest in the De Zeven Provinciën-class frigates.

On 30 November 2017, Alion Canada submitted a proposal based on the De Zeven Provinciën class for the Canadian River-class destroyer (2030s). Damen Group, as builder of the De Zeven Provinciën-class frigates, was part of Alion's team in this proposal. The proposed design has been adapted to the Canadian requirements. As a result, the Goalkeepers CIWS has been replaced, the design features more guns and it has different sensors and radars.

In May 2024, it was reported that the De Zeven Provinciën-class frigates might be sold after they have been retired from the Royal Netherlands Navy.

== Replacement ==
In 2020, it was announced that these intensively used ships will not be replaced as planned around 2025. Instead the ships will stay five years longer in service. The Royal Netherlands Navy and the German Navy will cooperate towards a joint platform design to replace both the Sachsen-class frigates and De Zeven Provinciën-class frigates from 2030–2035 onwards. In December 2023 it was reported that the letter to start the replacement project for the De Zeven Provinciën-class frigates, the so-called A-brief, had been delayed.

In March 2024, the State Secretary for Defence sent a letter to the Tweede Kamer in which plans to replace the current De Zeven Provinciën class air defense frigates with a new class of four new air defense frigates were announced. The four new ships are estimated to cost more than €3.5 billion and the first ship is expected to be operational in 2036. The Dutch Damen Group will have a main role in the construction of the new ships. Several systems of the De Zeven Provinciën-class frigates will also be reused for the new air defense frigates, including APAR Block 2-radars, 127mm naval guns, Naval Strike Missiles and Tomahawk missiles.

== List of ships ==
De Zeven Provinciën class construction data
| Pennant number | Name | Namesake | Laid down | Launched | Commissioned | Status |
|---|---|---|---|---|---|---|
| F802 | De Zeven Provinciën | The seven provinces of the Dutch republic Flagship of admiral de Ruyter | 1 September 1998 | 8 April 2000 | 26 April 2002 | In service |
| F803 | Tromp | Luitenant-Admiraal Maarten Tromp; Luitenant-Admiraal-Generaal Sir Cornelis Tromp, Bt | 3 September 1999 | 7 April 2001 | 14 March 2003 | In maintenance |
| F804 | De Ruyter | Luitenant-Admiraal-Generaal Michiel Adriaenszoon de Ruyter | 1 September 2000 | 13 April 2002 | 22 April 2004 | In service |
| F805 | Evertsen | Luitenant-Admiraal Johan Evertsen; Luitenant-Admiraal Cornelis Evertsen de Oude; Schout-bij-nacht Cornelis Evertsen de Jonge; Schout-bij-nacht Cornelis Evertsen de Jongste | 3 September 2001 | 19 April 2003 | 10 June 2005 | In service |

All ships were built at the Damen Schelde Naval Shipbuilding shipyard in Vlissingen, Netherlands.

== Similar ships ==
- Horizon-class frigate, French/Italian collaboration
- Iver Huitfeldt-class frigate, Denmark
- Shivalik-class frigate, India
- Sachsen-class frigate, German frigate based on the same radar configuration

== See also ==
- List of naval ship classes in service

== Notes ==
=== Bibliography ===
- Waters, Conrad (2016). "Section 6.2: Major Surface Combatants – 21st-Century European Air-Defence Ships". In Waters, Conrad (ed.). Navies in the 21st Century. Barnsley: Seaforth Publishing. p. 495-510. ISBN 978-1-4738-4992-1.
- Wertheim, Eric (2005). The Naval Institute Guide to Combat Fleets of the World 2005-2006: Their Ships, Aircraft, and Systems. Annapolis, Maryland: Naval Institute Press. ISBN 1-59114-934-7.
