= Battle of Dungeness =

First Anglo-Dutch War naval battle

Coordinates: 50°59′52″N 0°59′39″E

- Part of First Anglo-Dutch War
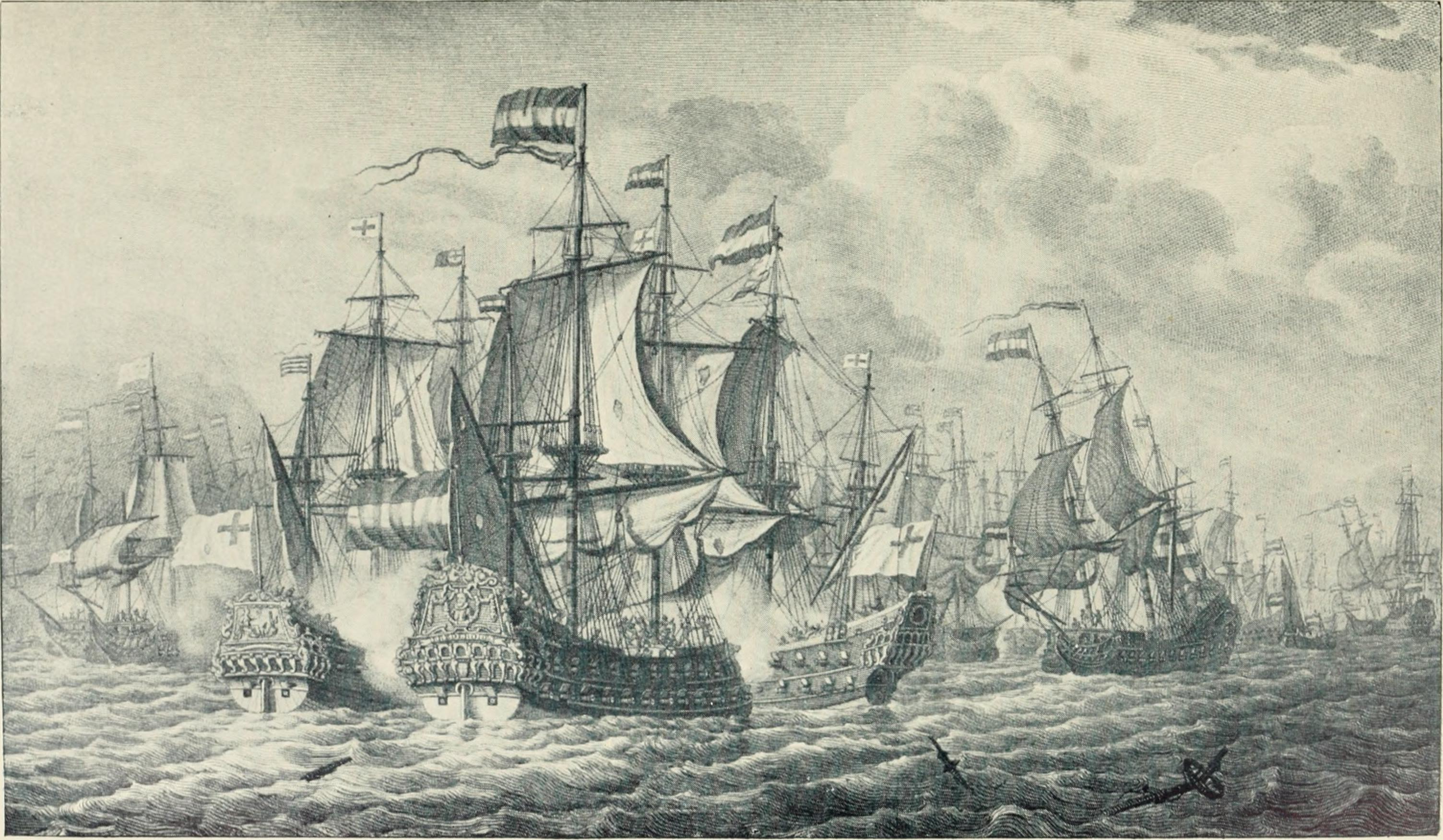
- Brederode entangled with the Garland and Anthony Bonaventure. To the right Hollandia comes to the rescue
Date	30 November 1652
Location	Off the coast of Dungeness
Result	Dutch victory
Territorial changes	Dutch gain temporary control of the English Channel

Belligerents
Dutch Republic	Commonwealth of England

Commanders and leaders
(Dutch Republic) Maarten Tromp	(Commonwealth of England) Robert Blake (Commonwealth of England) Benjamin Blake

Strength
73 warships and some fireships, though only part was able to participate	37 warships

Casualties and losses
1 ship lost in accidental explosion	5 ships lost: 2 captured 3 sunk

The naval Battle of Dungeness took place on 30 November 1652 (10 December in the Gregorian calendar) (Note: During this period in English history dates of events are usually recorded in the Julian calendar, and those the Netherlands are recorded in the Gregorian calendar. In this article, dates are in the Julian calendar with the start of the year adjusted to 1 January (see Old Style and New Style dates).) during the First Anglo-Dutch War near the cape of Dungeness in Kent.

== Background ==
In September 1652 the government of the Commonwealth of England, the Council of State, mistakenly believing that the United Provinces after their defeat at the Battle of the Kentish Knock would desist from bringing out a fleet so late in the season, sent away ships to the Mediterranean and the Baltic. At the same time the largest English vessels remained in repair and active ships were undermanned as sailors deserted or rioted because their wages were in arrears. This left the English weakened and badly outnumbered in home waters. Meanwhile, the Dutch were making every effort to reinforce their fleet. Dutch trade interests demanded that their navy would make a final effort to convoy merchantmen to the south.

== Battle ==
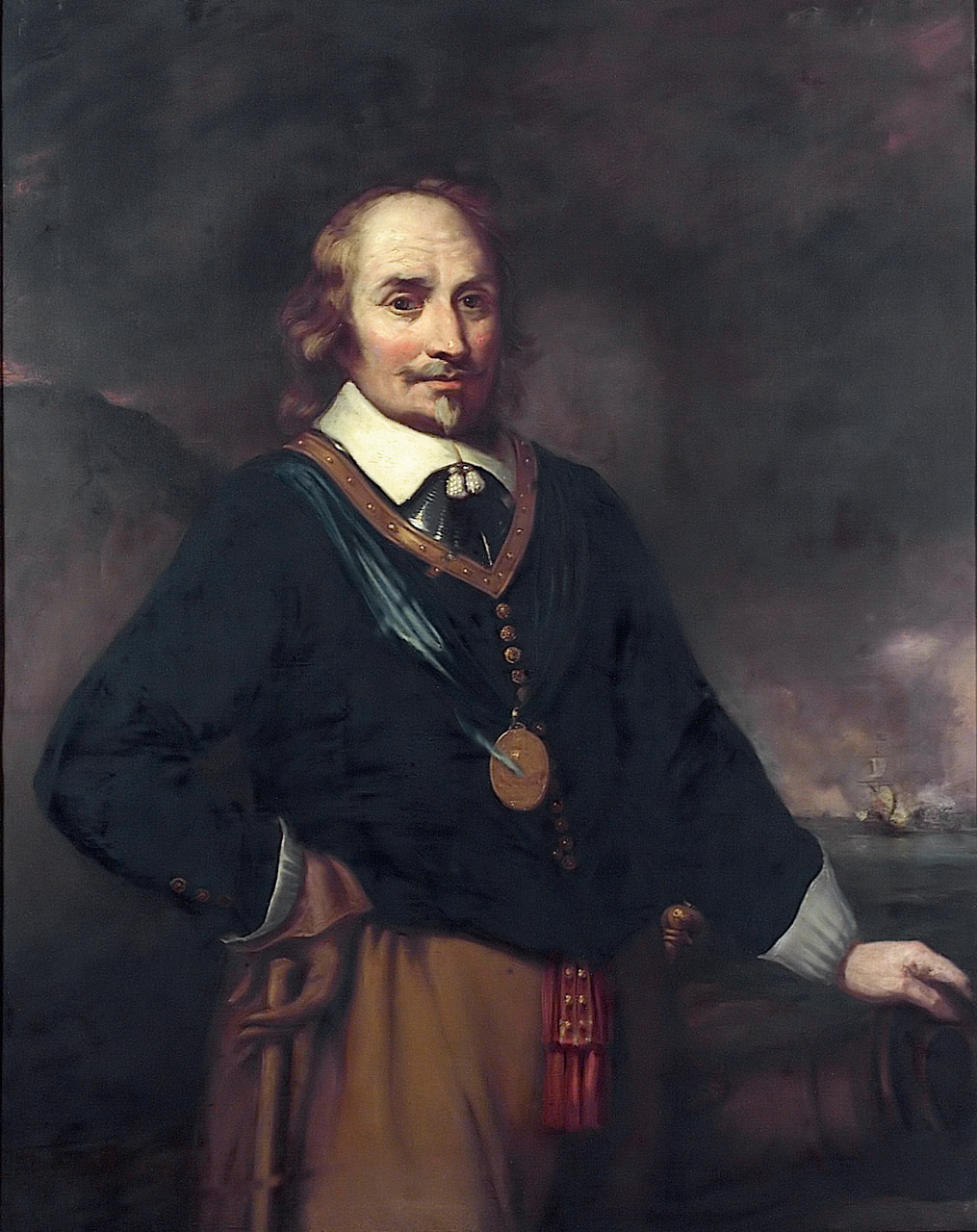
Maarten Tromp

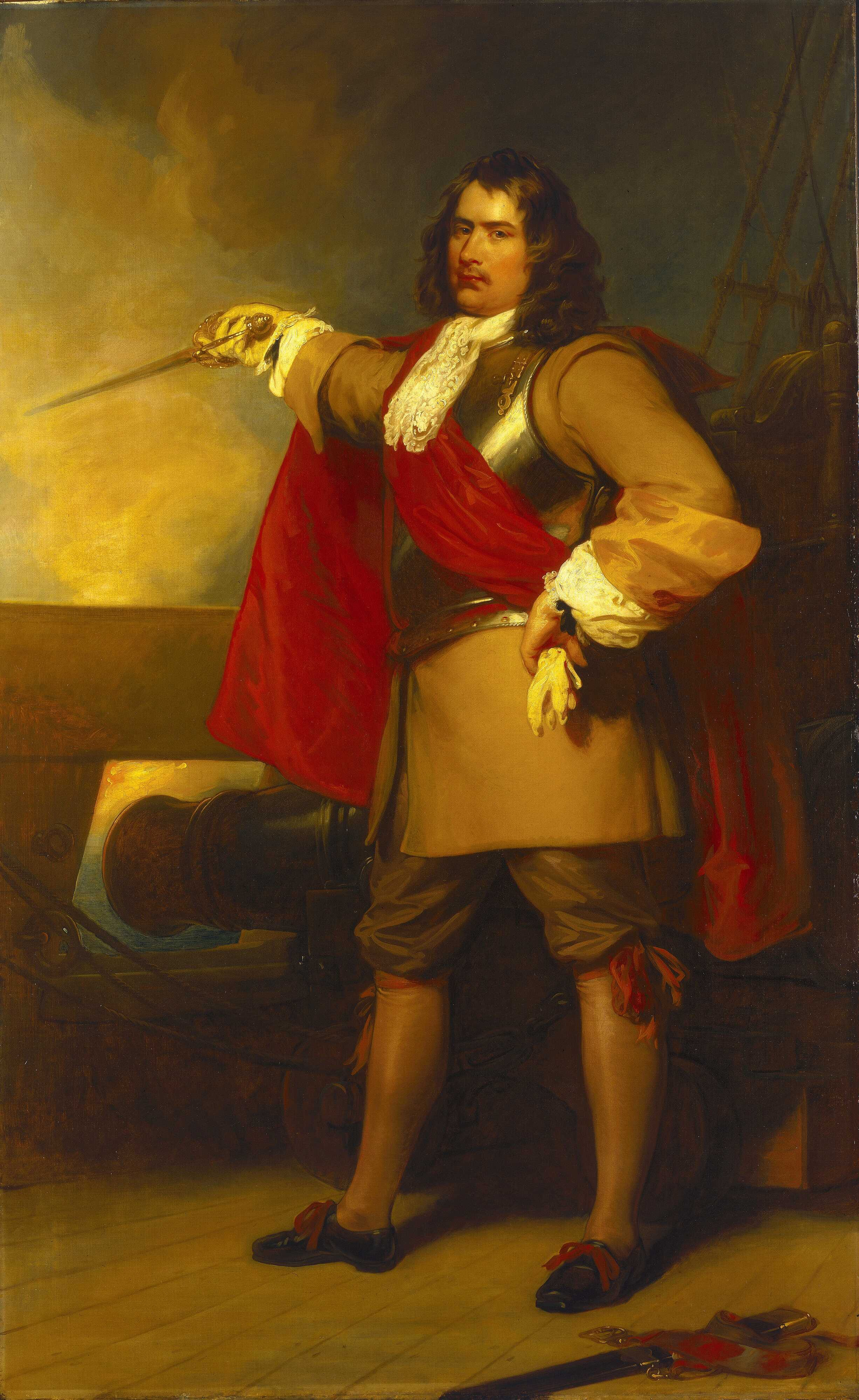
Robert Blake

On 21 November 1652 Old Style, 1 December New Style, Lieutenant-Admiral Maarten Tromp, again (unofficial) supreme commander after his successor Vice-Admiral Witte de With had suffered a breakdown because of his defeat at the Battle of the Kentish Knock, set sail from the naval port of Hellevoetsluis with 88 men of war and five fireships, escorting a vast convoy of 270 merchantmen bound for France, the Mediterranean and the Indies. At first, unfavourable southwestern gales forced him to return but on 23 November he again sailed south. With the convoy, accompanied by sixteen warships, safely delivered through the Straits of Dover, Tromp turned to the west in search of the English, and on 29 November 1652 he discovered the English fleet of 42 capital ships and ten smaller vessels anchored in the Downs, between the landheads of North Foreland and South Foreland, commanded by General at Sea Robert Blake. After a council of war in which it was decided to avoid battle, the English promptly left their anchorage, sailing south. Blake may not have realised how large the Dutch fleet was, or he may have feared to become trapped like the Spanish had been some years earlier in the Battle of the Downs. The wind was now strong from the northwest, so the English could not return to the Downs in any case, having to settle for Dover. The English fleet swiftly rounded South Foreland while the Dutch were unable to reach them, both fleets anchoring in the evening at about five miles distance. During the night a storm dispersed some Dutch vessels. Next morning, at noon the two fleets began to move southwest, with the English hugging the coast and the Dutch keeping some distance. The forces were separated by the Rip-Raps and the Varne Shoal and therefore unable to engage. Ultimately the curve of the shoreline, the cape of Dungeness or the "Hook of the Shingles" jutting out, forced the English to turn on a southerly course. Between the Varne Shoal and Dungeness a narrow exit exists. Blake had hoped to escape through it but when he arrived about seventeen Dutch ships were already waiting for him. Nevertheless, he continued his manoeuvre. At about 15:00, the leading ships of both fleets met in what a contemporary account called a "bounteous rhetoric of powder and bullet".

Blake's Triumph was the first larger ship to sail through the exit. At that moment Tromp's Brederode arrived and the Dutch commander immediately hoisted the red "bloodflag" as a sign to attack. Blake, noticing this, tacked to cross the bow of the Brederode, giving his opponent a broadside. In response, Tromp also tacked and fired a salvo. The next English ship, the Garland, then moved between the Triumph and the Brederode in an attempt to cross the latter's bow also. This failed however, the Garland ramming the bow of the Brederode at starboard with such force that both ships remained entangled. The snout and bowsprit of the Brederode broke off. The larger crew of the Brederode swiftly boarded the Garland. Tromp encouraged his men by promising a reward of five hundred guilders to the first who would strike the English flag. One sailor climbed into the main mast of the Garland and replaced the St George's Cross with the Prince's Flag. In despair, captain Richard Batten blew up his own upper deck to drive away the Dutch. Meanwhile, the third English ship to arrive, the Anthony Bonaventure, grappled the port of the Brederode. Covering the deck of the Dutch ship with canister shot, it soon forced its crew below deck. Noticing the plight of his commander, Vice-Admiral Johan Evertsen in turn boarded the port of the Anthony Bonaventure with his Hollandia, so that four ships were now attached. In ferocious fighting his men, losing sixty, killed the entire crew of the Anthony Bonaventure, including Captain Walter Hoxton. When Tromp's secretary, standing next to him, was killed by a musket ball, he exhorted the combined crews of the Brederode and the Hollandia to assault the Garland, exclaiming "Children, things cannot go on this way. It's them or us!". The Garland was taken, with sixty killed out of a crew of one-hundred fifty, including Captain Batten. At this point the Garland was in a bad condition, her rudder largely having been shot away.

Blake tried to assist the Garland and the Anthony Bonaventure but was constantly attacked by Dutch flagships such as the Princes Louise of Johan de Liefde and the Monnickendam of Pieter Florisse. The Triumph nearly avoided being grappled at both sides, by the Princes Louise and the Gulden Beer of Captain Jan de Haes. Blake received little support from the remainder of the English fleet. When the Happy Entrance entered the channel, she was at once assaulted and only with difficulty managed to extract herself. The other English ships began to understand the tactical situation: the exit functioned as a bottleneck and trying to force it would only allow the Dutch to overpower the English ships one by one. On the other hand, most Dutch ships did not engage either. Annoyed, Commodore Michiel de Ruyter on the Witte Lam entered the exit in the opposite direction to attack the mass of the English ships but no one followed him and he was forced to withdraw. He complained in his journal: "If we had had any help, yea of but ten or twelve ships, we would have beaten the entire fleet". Despite the tactical difficulties, it was unacceptable to leave Blake to his fate. The two most heavily armed English vessels apart from the Triumph, the Vanguard and the Victory, used their superior firepower to break the Dutch opposition and allowed Blake to retreat and join the English main force. The Triumph had lost her fore-topmast and Blake had been wounded.

Around 17:00, the onset of darkness ended the battle. A large part of the Dutch fleet had not even arrived yet. The English fleet by nightfall had lost five ships. These included the captured Garland and Anthony Bonaventure that would be taken into Dutch service as the Rozenkrans and the Bonaventura. Two smaller vessels were burnt, one of them perhaps the light frigate Acorn, and one sunk. In the evening, the Dutch lost the Schiedam, also known as the Gelderland because the States of Gueldres had paid for her, through fire and subsequent explosion. Captain Dirk Juinbol died from his wounds the next day. Blake that night retreated under cover of darkness to his anchorage in the Downs. The Dutch did not follow but used this time to repair the ships, especially the Brederode. The next morning the Dutch intercepted a group of three merchantmen sailing from the west. Their guard ship, the Merlin, managed to escape, but they themselves were taken and their cargo of figs and lemons were distributed among the Dutch crews. Tromp could not be satisfied with the result however as the Dutch had missed an opportunity to annihilate the English. On 1 December, he pursued Blake who, however, had already rounded South Foreland again. The wind turned east, which allowed Blake to quickly reach the Thames but slowed the Dutch. A group of English ships was encountered, that had been sent to reinforce Blake but had sailed past him in the darkness. Two new frigates, the Ruby and the Sapphire, managed to escape, but the Hercules, an armed merchantman, was run ashore by her captain, Zachary Browne. Most of the crew fled inland and the Hercules, and Browne, were captured by the Haes in 't Veld of Bastiaan Centsen, who managed to refloat the vessel.

Returning to the Strait of Dover, Tromp allowed his merchant convoy to split up, each group of merchantmen continuing its way towards their individual destination together with their protecting warships. Tromp considered attacking Blake in the Medway, but despite offering a reward of fifty Flemish pounds, in the entire Dutch fleet not a single pilot could be found who dared to navigate these dangerous waters. Not until 1667 did De Ruyter manage to execute such an attack, in the Raid on the Medway.

== Aftermath ==
The battle resulted in several reforms in the English Fleet. Part of Blake's force consisted of impressed merchant vessels that retained their civilian captains/owners. Many of them refused to participate in the battle. Some naval captains insisted on their traditional right to enter and leave the battle at times of their choosing, and to leave formation in order to secure any prize. Blake threatened to resign if something was not done. The Lords Commissioners of the Admiralty responded by requiring all impressed vessels to be under the command of naval captains, and issuing Sailing and Fighting Instructions which significantly enhanced an admiral's authority over his fleet.

The victory gave the Dutch temporary control of the English Channel and so control of merchant shipping. A legend says that Tromp attached a broom to his mast as a sign that he had swept the sea clean of his enemies, but in his book The Command of the Ocean, N.A.M. Roger doubts the legend as such a boasting action would have been out of character for Tromp. Additionally, at the time, a broom attached to a mast was the way of showing that a ship was for sale. Also, Dutch contemporaneous sources make no mention of it.

== Ships ==
=== England (Blake) ===
- Triumph 60 (flag)
- Victory 60 (Lionel Lane)
- Vanguard 58 (John Mildmay)
- Fairfax (Note: Probably there) 56 (John Lawson)
- Speaker 54 (John Gilson)
- Laurel 50 (John Taylor)
- Worcester 44 (Anthony Young)
- Garland 44 (Robert Batten) – Captured
- Entrance 43 (Edmund Chapman)
- Lion 42 (Charles Saltonsall)
- Convertine 42
- Foresight 42
- Dragon 40
- Fortune 36
- Hound 35
- Sapphire 34
- Princess Maria 33
- Mary flyboat 32
- Waterhound 30
- Dolphin 30 (William Badiley)
- Advantage 26 (William Beck)
- Swan 22
- Greyhound 20
- Hannibal 44 (Francis Barham)
- Anthony Bonaventure 36 (Walter Hoxon) – Captured
- Lisbon Merchant 34
- Loyalty 34
- Culpepper 30
- Cullen 28
- Prudent Mary 26
- Samuel 26
- Martha 25
- Katherine 24
- Exchange 24
- Acorn 22

=== The Netherlands (Tromp) ===
==== Tromp squadron ====
- Brederode 56 (flag, Admiralty of the Maze)
- Vrede 44, (flag of acting Vice-Admiral Gideon de Wildt, Admiralty of Amsterdam)
- Campen 40 (A)
- Wapen van Holland 39 (M)
- Prins 38 (flag of Rear-Admiral Corstiaen Corstiaenszoon de Munnick, Rotterdam Directors)
- Groote Liefde 38 (Amsterdam Directors)
- Engel Gabriel 36 (A)
- Burgh 34 (AD)
- Gideon 34 (AD)
- Hollandia 32 (A)
- Hoorn 32 (Admiralty of the Northern Quarter)
- Rotterdam 30 (M)
- Amsterdam 30 (A)
- Sint Pieter 28 (RD)
- Star 28 (A)
- Gouda 28 (A)
- Vergulde Pelicaen 28 (Harlingen Directors)
- Sint Maria 28 (AD)
- Hollandia 26 (RD)

==== De Ruyter squadron ====
- Vrijheid 46 (Amsterdam, flag of acting Vice-Admiral Augustijn Balck)
- Witte Lam 38 (Admiralty of Zealand, flag of Commodore Michiel de Ruyter, acting squadron commander replacing Vice-Admiral Witte de With)
- Sint Mattheeus 34 (AD)
- Croon Imperiael 34 (AD)
- Meerman 32 (RD)
- Zeelandia 32 (A)
- Schiedam (= Gelderland) 30 (R)
- Graaf Hendrick 30 (F)
- Leyden 28 (A)
- Achilles 28 (A)
- Arke Troyane 28 (AD)
- Frisia 28 (F)
- Breda 28 (F)
- Sphera Mundi 26 (R)
- Gulden Beer 24 (R)
- Overijssel 22 (R)

==== Evertsen squadron ====
- Hollandia 38 (Zealand Admiralty, flag of Vice-Admiral Johan Evertsen, flag captain Adriaan Banckert)
- Wapen van Veere 38 (Veeren Directors)
- Princes Louise 36 (acting Vice-Admiral Johan de Liefde, former flag of De With)
- Gulden Haen 36 (Middelburg Directors)
- Wapen van Zierikzee 34 (Zierikzee Directors)
- Faam 30 (Z)
- Gouden Leeuw 30 (MD)
- Gouden Leeuwin 30 (MD)
- Haes 30 (Flushing Directors)
- Zeeuwsche Leeuw 28 (Zealand Admiralty, flag of Commodore Cornelis Evertsen the Elder)
- Zeeridder 28 (Z)
- Neptunus 28 (Z)
- West Capelle 28 (Zealand Admiralty, captain Cornelis Evertsen the Younger)
- Goes 26 (Z)
- Liefde 26 (Z)
- Eendraght 24 (Z)
- Sint Joris 23 (Z)
- Liefde 23 (Z)
- Eendraght 18 (Z)

==== Florisse squadron ====
- Monnickendam 36 (Northern Quarter, flag of Rear-Admiral Pieter Florisse Blom)
- Wapen van Nassau 36 (Admiralty of Friesland)
- Tobias 30 (NQ)
- Casteel van Medemblick 30 (NQ)
- Sampson 30 (Hoorn Directors)
- Wapen van Monnickendam 28 (NQ)
- Prins Maurits 28 (NQ)
- Eenhoorn 28 (NQ)
- Lastdrager 28 (NQ)
- Prinses Albertina 26 (F)
- Peereboom 24 (NQ)
- Vergulde Schel 24 (NQ)
