= Second Battle of the James River (1673) =

- Part of the Franco-Dutch War and Third Anglo-Dutch War
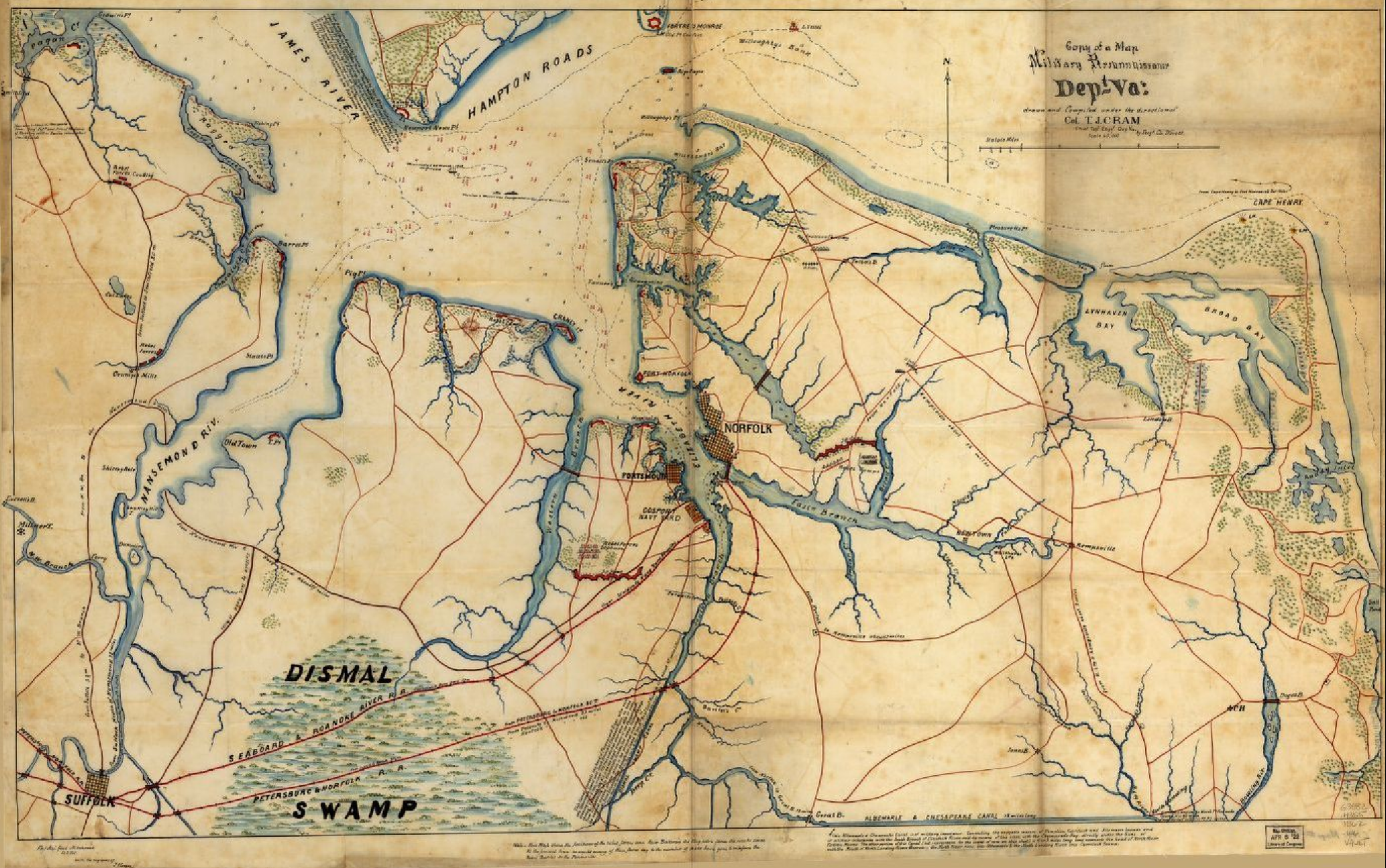
- Map of the battle area
Date	July 12–13, 1673 (O.S.); July 22–23, 1673 (N.S.)
Location	Hampton Roads and James River, Jamestown
Result	Dutch victory

Belligerents
Dutch Republic	England

Commanders and leaders
(Dutch Republic) Cornelis Evertsen the Youngest (Dutch Republic) Jacob Binckes	(England) Thomas Gardiner

Strength
9 ships	8 ships

Casualties and losses
3 killed	4 ships captured several more that where not participating in the battle

The Second Battle of the James River, also known as the Battle of Lynnhaven Bay, was a naval battle between a Dutch fleet under joint command of admirals Cornelis Evertsen the Youngest and Jacob Binckes and an improvised English squadron on 12 and 13 July 1673 (O.S., 22-23 July 1673 (N.S.)) in the Hampton Roads near the James River, during the Third Anglo-Dutch War.

== Background ==
In 1667, during the Second Anglo-Dutch War Dutch admiral Abraham Crijnssen fought the Battle of The James River (1667) in which he captured the English merchant fleet laden with tobacco from the Colony of Virginia and of the Province of Maryland. Tobacco was an important export product of the English colonies in the North America. Because of the Navigation Acts the Dutch had since the early 1650s formally been excluded from this trade, which motivated the Dutch navy to capture as much of the product as possible during the war, or at least destroy as much as possible. When the conflict resumed a few years later during the Third Anglo-Dutch War, the Dutch navy again was keen on disturbing the English tobacco trade. The Admiralty of Zeeland and the Admiralty of Amsterdam had separately sent out two squadrons, under the commands of Cornelis Evertsen and Jacob Binckes respectively, to conduct commerce raiding against English and French shipping in the Western Hemisphere in 1673. These squadrons had united in the Caribbean and, after first retaking Saba and Sint Eustatius from the English, they decided to raid the coast of the English colonies on the Atlantic Seaboard, like Crijnssen had done before them in the previous war.

The raid by Crijnssen had motivated governor William Berkeley of the Virginia colony to ask for naval reinforcements from England. In the spring of 1673, he received the support of two English armed merchantmen: Barnaby (50) under captain Thomas Gardiner and Augustine (50), commanded by captain Edward Cotterell. (Note: Both ships were hired armed merchantmen, intended as protectors of convoys. Gardiner and Cotterell were both Royal Navy officers, however, with wartime experience.) These ships would form the nucleus of an improvised English fighting force that was further made up of armed merchantmen that would defend the combined Virginia and Maryland tobacco fleets that was about to depart for England in early July 1673.

== The battle ==
The Dutch fleet of about 20 ships (including prizes) entered the Chesapeake Bay on 11 July 1673 (O.S.; 21 July 1673 N.S.) and anchored in Lynnhaven Roads. (Note: They were not all fighting ships, however. There were four Hollanders, among which Binckes' flagship Noordhollandt of 33 to 46 guns, and three Zeelanders from 30 to 46 guns, while in addition there were the Zeehond of 6 guns, and the fireship St. Joris.) They could see the masts of the Virginia tobacco fleet in the Hampton Roads. The English first decided to adopt a defensive stance, but their hand was forced in the morning of 12 July 1673 (O.S.) when suddenly the eight ships of the Maryland tobacco fleet appeared, sailing unsuspectingly straight at the Dutch fleet. (Note: The Dutch routinely used the acceptable ruse of showing the English ensign while approaching unsuspecting English vessels, hoisting the Prinsenvlag only at the last moment before opening fire. The English used the same ruse.) The English warships had to engage the Dutch, to distract them and lure them away from the strategic spot, to avoid the Maryland ships falling into Dutch hands without a fight.

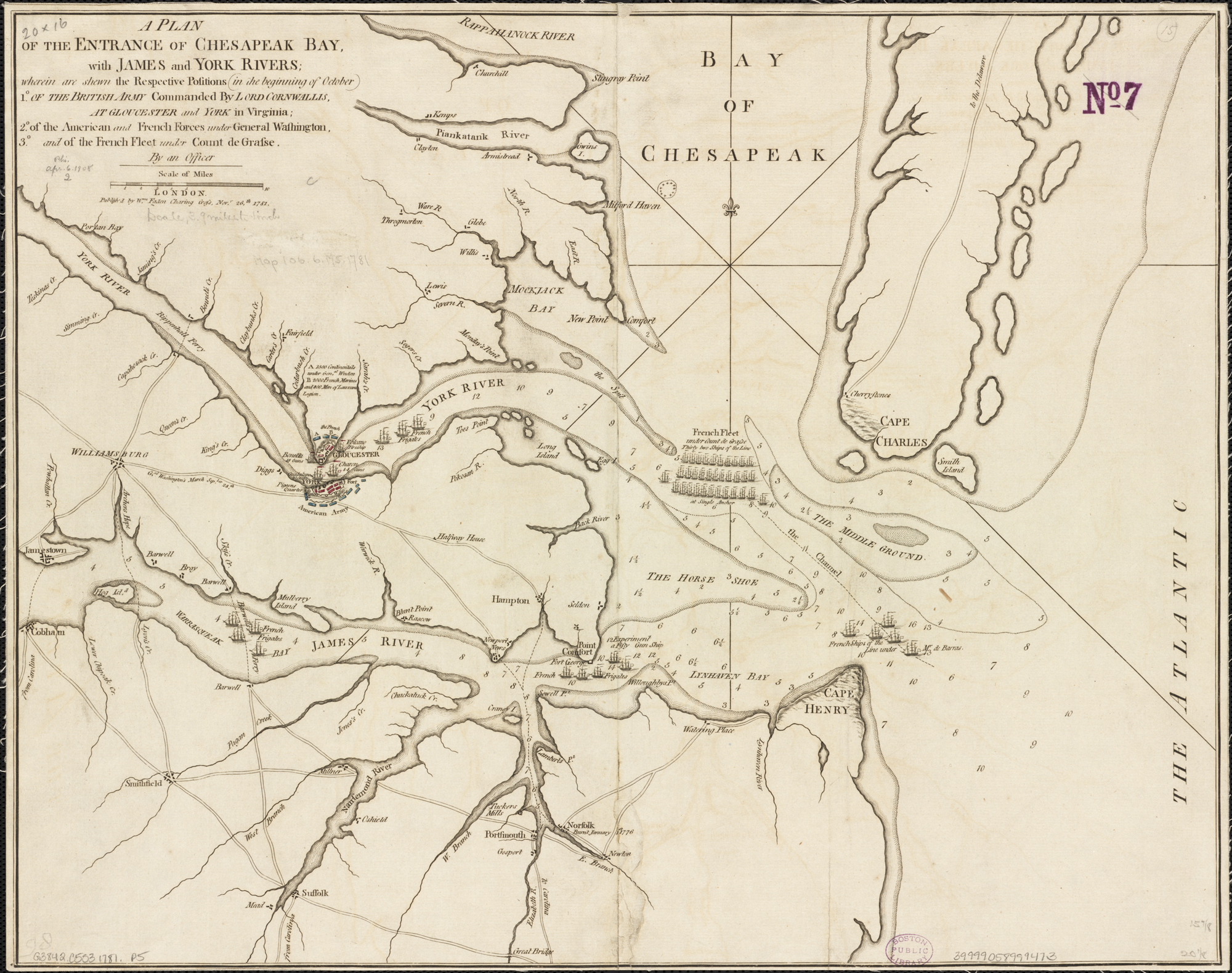
Detail map of the area where the battle was fought (Note: The map shows the Horseshoe shoal with its characteristic "tail" that would have to be rounded by the Maryland ships. The Dutch were anchored in what is today known as Lynnhaven Roads, just west of Cape Henry. The battle progressed west toward the mouths of the Elizabeth and James rivers, south of the shoal.)

The problem that faced the English commander was that the Dutch ships were anchored in a spot that dominated the escape route of the Maryland merchantmen: the tip, or "tail", of the triangular Horseshoe Shoals that the ships had to round before being able to sail up the James river. The English warships needed to manoeuver in such a way that the merchantmen had enough room to get around this point, without running aground, or onto the Dutch cannon. The Dutch also had the weather gage. This not only meant that the English ships had to beat to windward, to reach the Dutch ships, but that while doing this, due to heeling, their leeward gunports would be submerged, so had to be closed. The crews of the merchantmen that were pressed into service to assist the two English frigates were not up to this: four ran aground before a shot was fired, and a fifth ran away. Only one armed merchantman, commanded by captain Grove, remained with the two warships.

When the three remaining English ships had come within a cable length of the anchored Dutchmen they jibed and ran before the wind toward the James river. The Dutchmen took the bait, weighed anchor, and followed them. Captain Grove's ship ran aground at this point in time. HMS Barnaby now engaged the Dutch flagship Swaenenburgh (former HMS Saint Patrick) of Evertsen, by coming hard about and crossing Swaenenburgh's bow, raking her with a broadside at the same time, while HMS Augustine continued toward the mouth of the Elizabeth River after having fired a single broadside at the Dutch. (Note: Though Cotterell's behavior could be explained as just following the agreed strategy of luring away the Dutch, he was after return to England accused of cowardice, and his Royal Navy career was finished.) Gardiner alone fought an hours long running battle with Swaenenburgh and the other Dutch warships, until the falling dusk made them break off the fight. The Dutch then started to mop up the stranded English ships, capturing four ships. But while sailing up to join the anchored ship of Binckes, Swaenenburgh, misjudging the shoals, also ran aground, but with difficulty refloated during the night.

While the battle was raging the Maryland ships (bar one) escaped past the Virginia Capes, while most of the Virginia tobacco fleet escaped up the James river, toward Jamestown, where they found protection under the imaginary guns of Fort Nansemond. (Note: Fort Nansemond actually did not possess any artillery at this time.)

Due to the many shoals in the James, Nansemond and Elizabeth Rivers, which caused them to run aground repeatedly, (Note: Billings asserts that they were afraid of the artillery the fort was presumed to possess, but the log of Evertsen shows no evidence of this; Evertsen only complains of the nautical problems.) the Dutch ships kept their distance for five days, unable to get to the main tobacco fleet. They only were able to burn the four stranded ships and two that fell into their hands. (Note: Eventually they retained the following prizes (names are the Dutch translations given in Evertsen's log): Jan en Martha (pinnace); Postpaert (Fluyt); Madras (pinnace); Peerel (pinnace}; Elias (pinnace); Vreede (pinnace); and Benjamin (small fluyt).) During this wait, they captured a number of unsuspecting ships among which a ketch captained by a certain captain Samuel Davis. This little ship had important passengers on board, among whom was James Carteret, the illegitimate son of the proprietor of New Jersey, George Carteret, and his bride Francess Delavall. Also aboard was Samuel Hopkins. Both were co-conspirators against the governor of New Jersey, and so ill-disposed toward the English establishment in New Jersey.

== Aftermath ==
At first, the Dutch commanders did not understand the importance of Carteret and Hopkins. Carteret and his bride were soon released, and Carteret helped arrange an exchange of prisoners with governor Berkeley. However, a few days later, when Evertsen questioned Hopkins and captain Davis of the captured ketch more closely, Hopkins blurted out that governor Lovelace of the New York colony, up to 1664 the Dutch colony of New Netherland, was absent from his post, and that Fort James on the point of Manhattan (formerly protecting New Amsterdam, which was now called New York) was only weakly defended. This motivated Evertsen and Binckes to attempt to surprise the fort, and land marines on Manhattan, which resulted in the Dutch recapture of New Netherland on 30 July 1673 (O.S.) or 10 August 1673 (N.S.)

== Sources ==
- Billings, W. M. (2004). Sir William Berkeley and the Forging of Colonial Virginia. LSU Press. pp. 223–225. ISBN 9780807130124.
- Quarstein, J. V. (2020). "Hampton Roads Invaded: The Anglo-Dutch Naval Wars". The Mariner's Museum and Park.
- Shomette, Donald G.; Haslach, Robert D. (1988). Raid on America: The Dutch Naval campaign of 1672-1674. University of South Carolina Press. ISBN 978-0788422454.
- De Waard, Cornelis (1928). De Zeeuwsche expeditie naar de West onder Cornelis Evertsen den Jonge 1672-1674: Nieuw Nederland een jaar onder Nederlandsch Bestuur) (in Dutch). Linschoten-Vereeniging.
- Webb, S. S. (1995). 1676: The End of American Independence. Syracuse University Press. p. 113. ISBN 9780815603610.
