= HMS Fortune =

Twenty-two ships of the Royal Navy have borne the name HMS Fortune:

- English ship Fortune (1512) was a ship in service in 1512.
- English ship Fortune (1522) was a ship in service in 1522.
- English ship Fortune (1627) was a ship, formerly the French Fortunee. She was captured in 1627 and last appears on navy lists in 1635.
- English ship Fortune (1649) was a 12-gun Royalist ship, captured by the Parliamentarians in 1644 and renamed Robert. She was captured by Irish Royalists in 1649.
- English ship Fortune (1644) was a 12-gun Royalist ship purchased in 1644 and captured that year by the Parliamentarians. She was renamed Dove, and was lost in 1650.
- English ship Fortune (1651) was a ship captured in 1651, and captured in 1652 by the Dutch.
- English ship Fortune (1652) was a 10-gun fireship captured in 1652 and last listed in 1653.
- English ship Fortune (1652) was a 32-gun ship, formerly the French Fortunee. She was captured in 1652 and sold in 1654.
- HMS Fortune (1666 fireship) was a 6-gun fireship captured in 1666 and expended later that year.
- HMS Fortune (1666 flyboat) was a 4-gun flyboat captured from the Dutch in 1666 and sunk as a blockship in 1667.
- HMS Fortune (1672) was an 8-gun flyboat captured from the Dutch in 1672 and sold in 1674.
- HMS Fortune (1699) was a storeship purchased in 1699 and wrecked in 1700.
- HMS Fortune (1700) was a storeship captured in 1700 and still on navy lists in 1702.
- HMS Fortune (1709) was a 24-gun storeship launched in 1709 and sold in 1713.
- HMS Fortune was a 14-gun sloop launched in 1744. She was captured by the French in 1745, was recaptured as an 18-gun sloop in 1746, and had been renamed HMS Fortune by 1756. She was converted to a fireship in 1759 and was sold in 1770.
- HMS Fortune (1770) was a 10-gun brig-sloop purchased in 1770 and still in service in 1772.
- HMS Fortune (1778) was a 14-gun sloop launched in 1778 and captured by the French in April 1780 and served with the French navy under the same name. In October 1783 she became a packet ship under the name Courrier de Lorieint (and later Courrier de Lorient No.3), serving out of Lorient on the line Lorient-New York. In January 1787 she was transferred to the Régie des Paquebots, for whom she served on the Havre-New York line. She was put up for sale at Havre in December 1788 and sold in January 1789 to Mr. Ruellan.
- HMS Fortune (1779) was a 14-gun sloop captured from the Americans in 1779 and lost in 1780.
- HMS Fortune (1780) was a 14-gun brig-sloop launched in 1780 and wrecked in 1797.
- HMS Fortune (1798) was an 18-gun sloop captured from the French in 1798 and recaptured by them in 1799.
- HMS Fortune (1913) was an Acasta-class destroyer launched in 1913 and sunk at the Battle of Jutland in 1916.
- HMS Fortune (H70) was an F-class destroyer launched in 1934. She was transferred to the Royal Canadian Navy in 1943 as HMCS Saskatchewan, and was broken up in 1946.

== See also ==
- HMS Fortune Prize
- HMS Fortunee
- HMCS Fortune
