= Cornelis Evertsen the Youngest =

Dutch States Navy officer

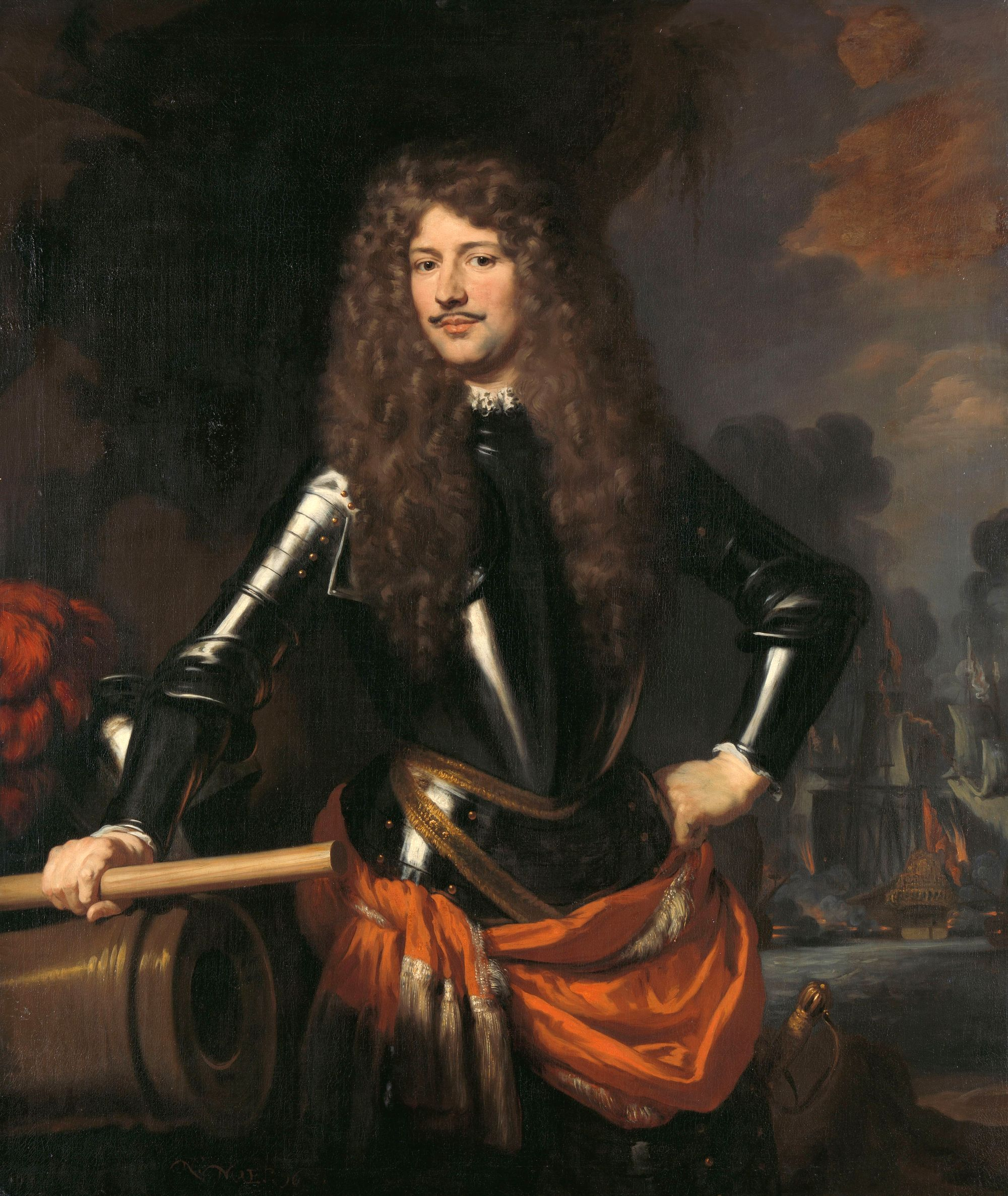
- Portrait by Nicolaes Maes, 1680

Supreme Commander Confederated Dutch Navy
- In office 1684–1690

Lieutenant Admiral of Zeeland
- In office 1684–1706

Vice Admiral of Zeeland
- In office 1679–1684

Personal details
- Born: 16 November 1642 Vlissingen, Dutch Republic
- Died: 16 November 1706 (aged 64) Vlissingen, Dutch Republic
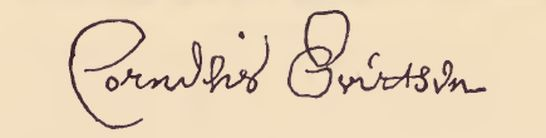
- Signature

Military service
- Rank: Admiral
- Battles/wars: Second Anglo-Dutch War; Battle of Lowestoft; Four Days Battle; St. James's Day Battle; Raid on the Medway; Third Anglo-Dutch War and Franco-Dutch War; Action of 12 March 1672; Battle of Solebay; Dutch Raid on North America; Reconquest of New Netherland; Second Battle of the James River; Nine Years' War; 1688 Invasion of England; Battle of Beachy Head

Cornelis Evertsen the Youngest (16 November 1642 – 16 November 1706) was a Dutch States Navy officer from Vlissingen who served as Lieutenant Admiral of Zeeland and Supreme Commander of the Dutch navy. Of a family that included several other naval admirals, including his father, Evertsen is noted for his distinguished service during the Second Anglo-Dutch War, Third Anglo-Dutch War, the Franco-Dutch War, the Glorious Revolution invasion, and the Battle of Beachy Head during the Nine Years' War.

== Biography ==
Cornelis was born in Vlissingen as the second son of Lieutenant-Admiral Cornelis Evertsen the Elder. He was a nephew of Lieutenant-Admiral Johan Evertsen and cousin of the latter's son Vice-Admiral Cornelis Evertsen the Younger, with whom he is very often confused. Cornelis was nicknamed Keesje den Duvel ("Little Cornelis the Devil") for his cantankerous and hot-tempered character, which he shared with his father. He followed the Protestant Synod of Dort. and Cornelis Evertsen the Younger, also played a prominent military role.

=== Second Anglo-Dutch War ===
Already at the age of ten, in 1652, Cornelis sailed on his father's ship. He became privateer in 1665 during the Second Anglo-Dutch War and was captured by the English on 15 April of that year when his force of two ships was defeated by three English vessels, among them the Diamond and the Yarmouth. His crew had to bodily restrain him to prevent him from blowing up his ship, the Eendragt of 32 cannon. Because of his famous father and uncle he was considered worthy of royal interest. During interrogation the brother of the king, Lord High Admiral James, the Duke of York, inquired about a bullet hole in the top of Cornelis's hat, asking the captain to excuse the English for having damaged his clothing. Cornelis grumpily answered that he was proud of the hole; only he would have preferred it to have been a bit lower, to now being a prisoner.

John Evelyn recounts how Cornelis was on 24 April 1665 released for his wit by Charles II of England in person: Cornelis having been admitted into the royal bedchamber, His Majesty gave him his hand to kiss, and restored him his liberty; asked many questions concerning the fight (it being the first blood drawn), his Majesty remembering the many civilities he had formerly received from his relations abroad — this was a reference to the support the Evertsen family had given Charles during his exile. Evelyn was then commanded "to go with him to the Holland Ambassador, where he was to stay for his passport, and I was to give him 50 pieces in broad gold'".

After his return in 1665 Cornelis volunteered to fight in the Battle of Lowestoft aboard his father's flagship; in July he became captain with the Admiralty of Zealand. In 1666 Cornelis was captain of his father's flagship Walcheren during the Four Days Battle. During the first night he witnessed his father's death, the Lieutenant-Admiral being cut in two by the parting shot of the escaping Henry. He also fought in the St. James's Day Battle where his uncle was killed. Following that battle, Evertsen was promoted to Vice Admiral in 1666, becoming the youngest Admiral in the Admiralty of Zeeland. The following year he participated in the great Dutch victory on the Medway.

=== Third Anglo-Dutch War ===
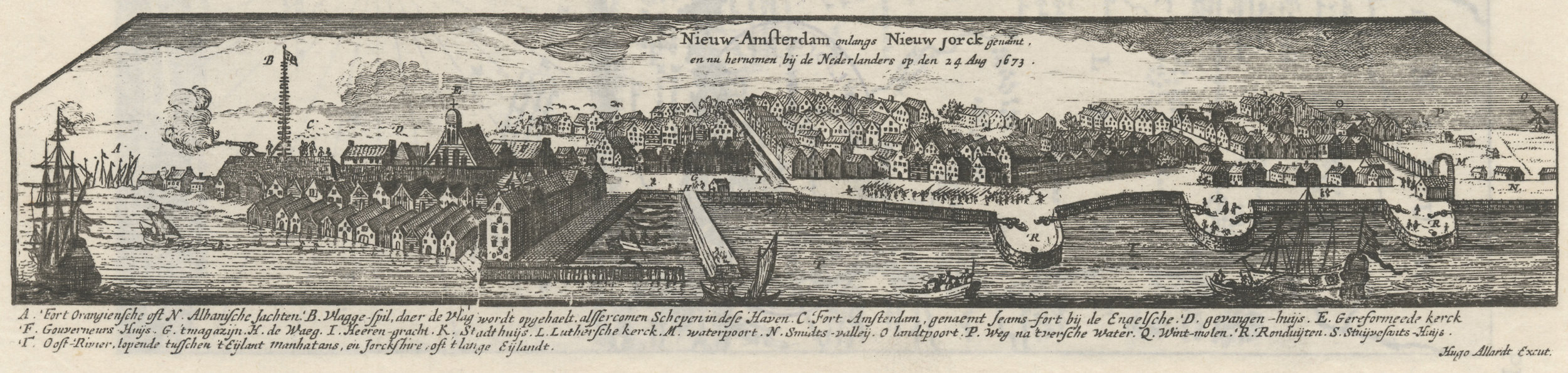
New Amsterdam lately New York retaken by the Netherlanders on 24 Aug 1673

Before the Third Anglo-Dutch War had officially began, King Charles II in 1660 was restored to the throne. The King's courtiers along with the English merchant class were determined to claim as large a portion of the West African coast as possible, and to this end they organized The Company of the Royal Adventurers into Africa, which at once pitted that company against the Dutch West India Company. They clandestinely sent Sir Robert Holmes with a fleet of warships under the guise of a private enterprise in the attempt to capture the rich returning Dutch Smyrna merchant fleet. Within one year Holmes had previously captured the Dutch settlements at Cape Verde, which was in the possession of the Dutch since 1621, the castle at Cape Coast and other Dutch possessions along the Gold Coast. Evertsen was in command of the naval escort fleet which successfully repelled Holmes' attack. That action, which commenced on the morning of March 12, along with the CRA seizing Dutch African Gold Coast slave trading forts and settlements, became the casus belli which started the war.

At the Battle of Solebay Evertsen commanded the Swaenenburgh (44 guns) (the captured English frigate formerly HMS Saint Patrick). In 1673 (the Swaenenburgh still his flagship), along with Jacob Binckes, their combined squadron of nine warships raided the English and French Antilles from Barbados to Nevis capturing over a dozen vessels. They reinforced Dutch Surinam with soldiers and supplies and retook Saba and Sint Eustatius which had been seized by the English earlier in the war.

The expedition then sailed to the coast of the English North American colonies, first attacking Hampton Roads (approaching with false English colors) and capturing or destroying most of the combined Maryland and Virginia tobacco fleet which had just been loaded and assembled for its annual voyage to London (a value of over 240,000 guilders) in the Second Battle of the James River (1673). They landed marines and torched several plantations.

While operating in the James River Evertsen captured a smaller English ketch and learned of the vulnerable condition of Fort James (formerly called Fort Amsterdam) and subsequently sailed north to reconquer New Amsterdam and Fort Amsterdam on Manhattan Island. Evertsen and Commodore Jacob Binckes arrived on August 7, 1673, with a combined fleet of twenty-three ships, carrying 1,600 men. Governor Francis Lovelace, commander of the fort was away and left Captain John Manning in command who was alarmed at the arrival of such an enormous fleet. The fort at this time had a small garrison of 60-80 men with only 30-36 guns. Manning sent a message to Admiral Evertsen asking why he arrived with such a military force, where Evertsen replied that he was there to take back what rightfully belonged to the Dutch. When Manning insisted to see Evertsen's commission, the Admiral replied that it was stuck in the barrel of a cannon, and that the English would soon see it in due course if they did not surrender the fort. After a brief battle the fort was recaptured by the Dutch on August 9. In a proclamation, dated, August 14, 1673, signed by Commanders Evertsen and Binckes, they assured the colonists, "that o" intention is no wise to hurt or spoile any of the good inhabitants but to the contrary to gouerne them as true and ffaithful subjects, prouided they doe undertake nothing in prejudice of the Gouennent." (exact spelling).

The final act of the expedition was raiding the Newfoundland fisheries. They destroyed a fort and several fine homes as well as the fisheries themselves and took prisoners. A large number of fishing boats were destroyed and several large merchantmen full of fish were captured. In all, the expedition had captured 34 prizes before heading back to Europe. The expedition sailed to Cadiz before returning to the Netherlands where in an odd ship to ship duel, a single combat took place between the English HMS Tyger and one of Evertsen's ships, the Schakerloo. The English ship was victorious, and unknown to all present, the battle actually took place a day after the war was over - making it the last battle of the Third Anglo-Dutch War. When he returned in July 1674, he was accused of disobedience, because the government of Zeeland were not enthusiastic about his conquest seeing the colony as too expensive to maintain; his real orders had been to conquer Saint Helena and Cayenne but this had not occurred due to a superior English naval force present at Saint Helena. New York was ceded by the Treaty of Westminster (1674) back to England in exchange for the English abandoning all forts, towns and claims to Suriname, making it exclusively Dutch, as well as ceding the tiny Banda spice islands of Ai and Run to the Dutch giving them a complete monopoly on the Spice Trade.

=== Admiral in the service of the Zeeland Admiralty ===
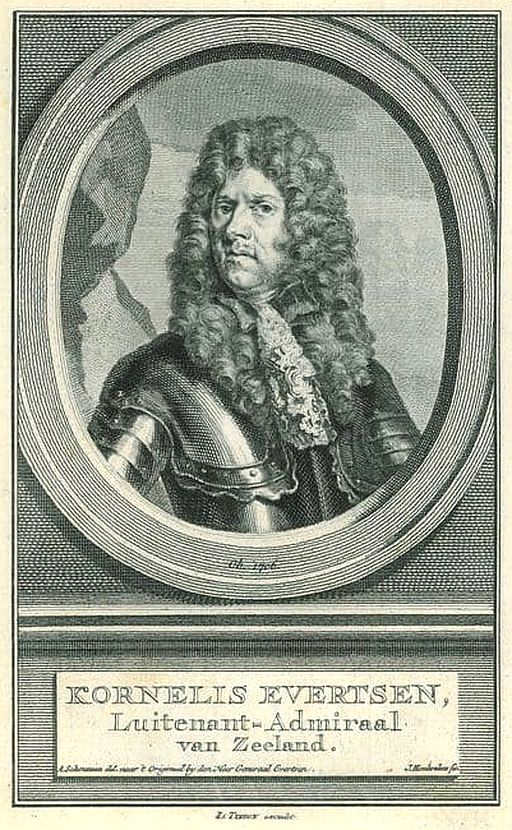
Cornelis Evertsen in later years Engraving by Jacobus Houbraken

In January 1675 Cornelis became schout-bij-nacht in the service of the Admiralty of Zeeland. In 1677 he commanded a blockade against the Dunkirkers. On 20 September 1679 he replaced his deceased cousin Cornelis Evertsen the Younger as Vice-Admiral; he became on 1 April 1684 Lieutenant-Admiral of Zeeland and supreme commander of the combined Dutch fleet, replacing Cornelis Tromp. In 1688 he helped to organise and co-led the invasion fleet stadtholder William III used during the Glorious Revolution. He directly commanded the vanguard of the fleet.

In 1690 Cornelis was commander of the vanguard of the Anglo-Dutch fleet at the Battle of Beachy Head. As commander of the van, his force made contact with a far superior French fleet at the beginning of the battle and with only 20 warships he held off 75 French ships with no help from Lord Torrington (the overall commander of the Allied fleet) who was unwilling to commit the main and rear of the battle line in engaging the French. Evertsen saved the majority of his squadron outfoxing the French by suddenly anchoring while under full sail, allowing the French fleet to be carried away with the tidal stream before they realized what was happening. The French then pursued the remainder of the Allied fleet which retreated back to the Medway. Torrington was court-martialled after the battle, and though acquitted was relieved from command and would never receive another command again.

In that same year Evertsen was replaced as supreme Dutch naval commander by Cornelis Tromp, who had been his predecessor in the office. But Tromp soon died and was replaced by Philips van Almonde in his turn. Cornelis, after 1690, never commanded a fleet again and died in 1706. Cornelis is buried in Middelburg, and was buried under the tomb of his father and uncle. He was succeeded as Lieutenant-Admiral of Zeeland by his younger brother Geleyn Evertsen, born in January 1655.

== Personal life ==
According to family papers, Cornelis never married, nor is it known that he ever had a serious relationship with a woman.

== Bibliography ==
- Aa, Abraham Jacob van der (1852). Biographisch woordenboek der Nederlanden (Biographical dictionary of the Netherlands). Vol. V. Haarlem, J.J. van Brederode. — Table of Contents to entire work, w/ links; 1859 printing
- Brodhead, John Romeyn (1871). History of the state of New York. Vol. II. Harper & Brothers.
- Brodhead, John Romeyn; Fernow, Berthold; O'Callaghan, Edmund Bailey (1853). Documents relative to the colonial history of the state of New York. Vol. III. Albany, N.Y.: Weed, Parsons and Co.
- Davies, K. G. (1970) [1957]. The Royal African Company. Atheneum. ISBN 978-0-41519-0770.
- Fernow, Berthold, ed. (1897). Records of New Amsterdam from 1653-1674 and Index. Vol. VI. New York: Knickerbocker Press.
- Kammen, Michael G. (1975). Colonial New York : a history. New York: Charles Scribner Sons. ISBN 978-0-68414-3255. (Reprinted in 1996 ISBN 978-0-19510-7791
- Van Lennep, Jacob (1880). De geschiedenis van Nederland, aan het Nederlandsche Volk verteld [The history of the Netherlands, told to the Dutch nation] (in Dutch). Leiden; z.j.
- Shomette, Donald; Haslach, Robert D (1988). Raid on America : the Dutch naval campaign of 1672-1674. University of South Carolina Press. ISBN 978-0-78842-2454.
- Stokes, Isaac Newton Phelps (1915). The iconography of Manhattan Island, 1498-1909. Vol. I. New York: Robert H. Dodd. "compiled from original sources and illustrated by photo-intaglio reproductions of important maps, plans, views, and documents in public and private collections"
- De Waard, Cornelis (1928). De Zeeuwsche expeditie naar de West onder Cornelis Evertsen den Jonge 1672-1674: Nieuw Nederland een jaar onder Nederlandsch Bestuur) (in Dutch). Linschoten-Vereeniging.
- Wilson, James Grant (1892–1893). The memorial history of the city of New York, from its first settlement to the year 1892. Vol. I. New York History Co.
- Zook, George Frederick (1919). The Company of royal adventurers trading into Africa. Press of the New Era Printing Co.
