= Battles of Tobago =

Naval battle

First Battle of Tobago
- Part of the Franco-Dutch War
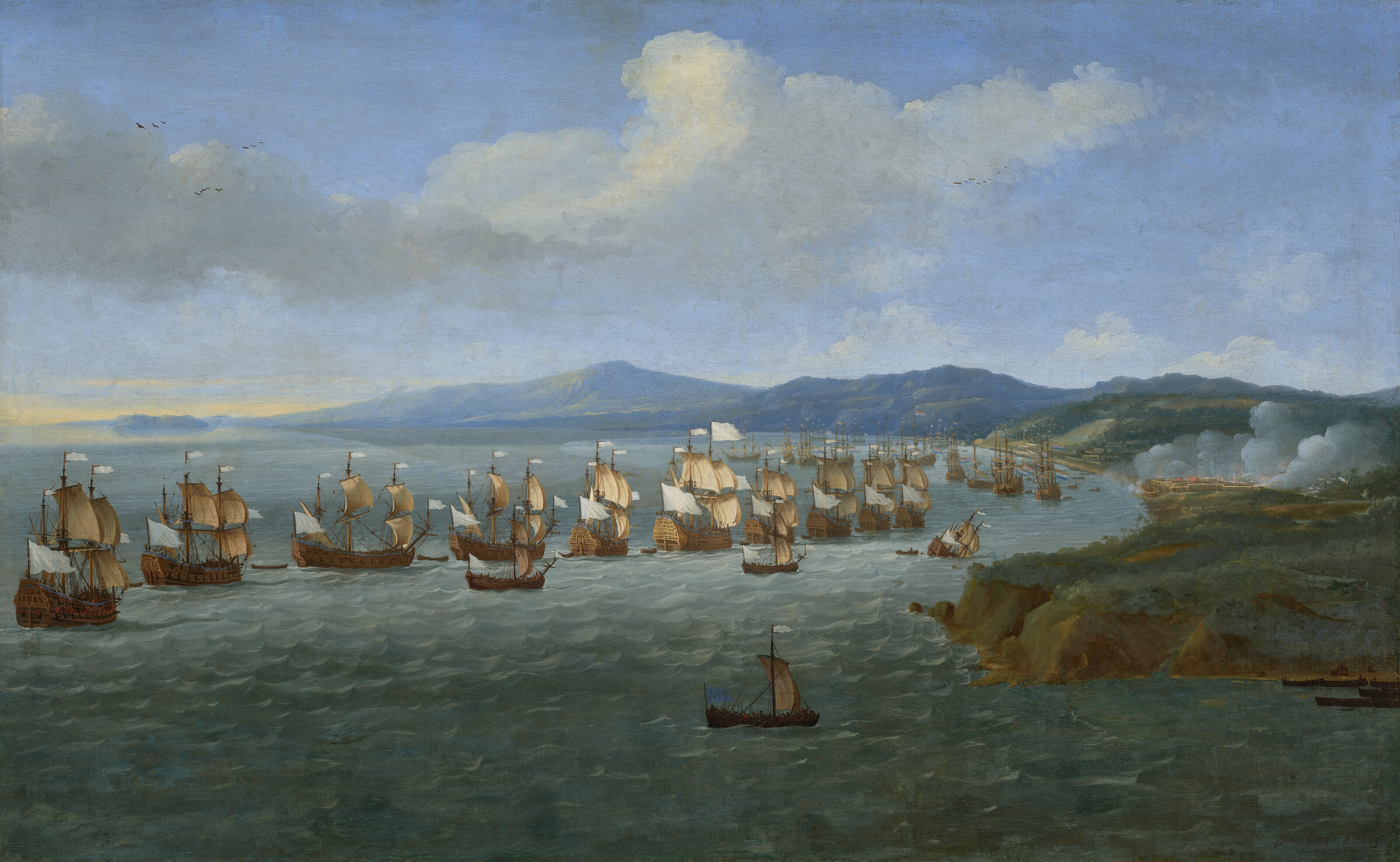
- Painting of the battle
Date	3 March 1677
Location	Off Tobago, Caribbean Sea 11°15′0.0″N 60°40′1.2″W
Result	Dutch victory

Belligerents
Dutch Republic	France

Commanders and leaders
Jacob Binckes	Jean II d'Estrées

Strength
9 warships Several smaller vessels	9 warships Several smaller vessels

Casualties and losses
1 warship destroyed 1 warship sunk	2 warships destroyed 2 warships captured

The Battles of Tobago were two naval battles between the French Navy and the Dutch States Navy during the Franco-Dutch War in 1677.

== First Battle of Tobago ==
The First Battle of Tobago took place on 3 March 1677 between a Dutch fleet under the command of Jacob Binckes and a French squadron commanded by Jean II d'Estrées attempting to recapture the island of Tobago in the West Indies. There was much death and destruction on both sides. One of the Dutch supply ships caught fire and exploded; the fire then quickly spread in the narrow bay causing several warships, among them the French flagship Glorieux, to catch fire and explode in turn which resulted in great loss of life.

== Order of battle (first battle) ==
=== France ===
- Glorieux (flagship, 64 guns) - (Jean, Comte d'Estrées) Destroyed; 60 killed
- L'Intrépide (56 guns) - (Louis de Gabaret) Captured
- Le Precieux (54 guns) - Captured
- Le Marquis (46 guns) - (Chevalier de Lézines) Destroyed
- Le Galant (46 guns) - Damaged
- Le Fendant (54 guns) - (Charles de Courbon de Blénac) Damaged
- Fortuné (52 guns) - (Nicholas Lefèvre de Méricourt)
- Le Laurier (40 guns) - (Charles-François de Machault de Belmont)
- Le Soleil d'Afrique (40 guns) - Captain killed

=== Dutch Republic ===
- Beschermer (flagship, 54 guns) - (Jacob Binckes) 50 killed
- Huis te Kruiningen (58 guns) - (Roemer Vlacq) Captured; 56 killed
- Zeelandia (34 guns) - (Pieter Constant) 44 killed
- Middelburg (38 guns) - (Jan Swart) Destroyed
- Sphaera Mundi (41 guns)
- Gouden Ster (30 guns) - (Pieter Cooreman) Captain killed
- Hertog van York (26 guns) - (Frederick Sweers)
- Alcion (24 guns) - (Cornelis Stolwijk) Sunk
- Popkensburg (24 guns) - (Pieter Slolwyck)
- Sint Salvador (6 guns)

== Second Battle of Tobago ==
Second Battle of Tobago
- Part of the Franco-Dutch War
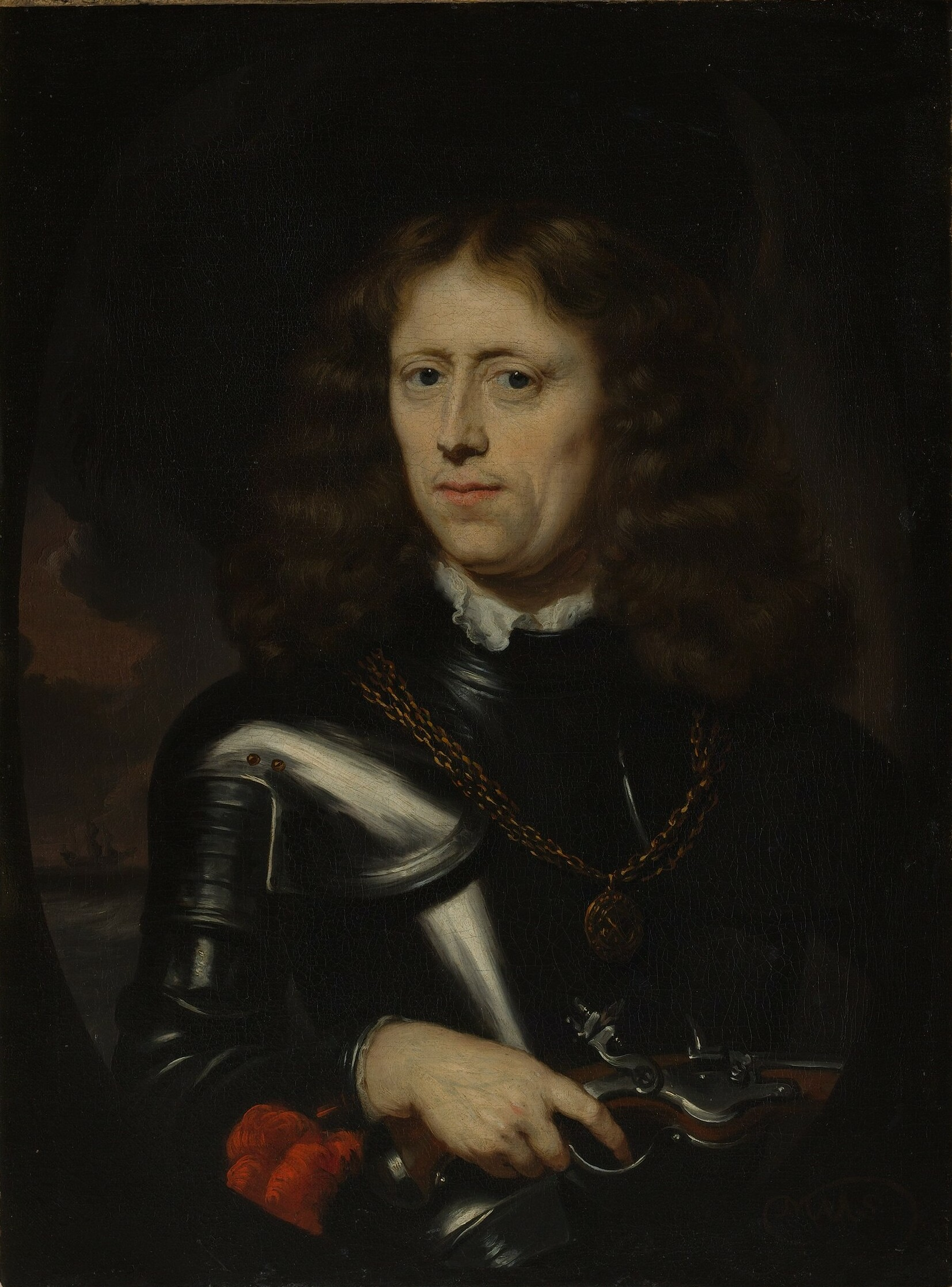
- Jacob Binckes, who was killed in the battle
Date	11 December 1677
Location	Off Tobago, Caribbean Sea
Result	French victory

Belligerents
France	Dutch Republic

Commanders and leaders
Jean II d'Estrées	Jacob Binckes †

Strength
6 ships of the line 4 smaller vessels 520 guns 3,500 crewmen	10 ships of the line 3 smaller vessels 650 guns 4,000 crewmen

Casualties and losses
1,200 killed or wounded 4 ships of the line lost	1,800 killed or wounded 600 prisoners 10 ships of the line lost

The French fleet retreated but made a second attempt to capture Tobago at the end of the year, during the Second Battle of Tobago, which took place on 11 December 1677. This time, the French were successful. The French squadron sailed to the Cape Verde Islands, took the slaving island of Gorée (off Senegal) from the Dutch, then sailed fast to the Antilles. D'Estrées stopped briefly at Barbados to find out what he could about the strength of the Dutch, then reached Tobago on 6 December 1677.Blénac led the land force of 950 men, with an artillery train to besiege the Dutch fort. The mortars and cannon had to be dragged about 4 miles (6.4 km) to the top of a hill that overlooked the fort, which took three days. The third shell fired by the French hit the powder magazine, and the explosion destroyed the fort. 250 men died, including Admiral Jacob Binckes and 16 officers. The French attacked at once and within an hour had seized what remained of the fort as well as four sinking ships. They took 600 prisoners. The French destroyed all the houses and plantation buildings on the island, deported the people and abandoned the island. This victory destroyed Dutch military power in the Antilles. D'Estrées next sailed to Martinique to prepare an attack on Curaçao. (Note: D'Estrées delayed the attack on Curaçao for four months while he tried to recruit more forces, and finally left on 7 May. His fleet ran onto coral reefs off the Las Aves archipelago, lost all but one of the ships of the line, and was forced to return to France.) Blénac raised a large contingent of buccaneers to support this expedition.

== Sources ==
- Bodart, Gaston (1908). Militär-historisches Kriegs-Lexikon (1618-1905) (in German). Vienna and Leipzig: C. W. Stern.
- Marley, David (2010), Pirates of the Americas, ABC-CLIO, ISBN 978-1-59884-201-2
- Pritchard, James S. (2004-01-22), In Search of Empire: The French in the Americas, 1670-1730, Cambridge University Press, ISBN 978-0-521-82742-3
- Woodcock, Henry Iles (1867), A History of Tobago, author
