= English ship Garland (1620) =

History

England
- Name: Garland
- Builder: Burrell, Deptford
- Launched: 1620
- Captured: By the Dutch, 1652
- Notes: Participated in: Battle of Dover (1652); Battle of Dungeness

Dutch Republic
- Acquired: 1652

General characteristics
- Class & type: Middling ship
- Length: 96 ft (29 m) (keel)
- Beam: 32 ft (9.8 m)
- Depth of hold: 13 ft 10 in (4.22 m)
- Sail plan: Full-rigged ship

Garland was a middling ship of the English navy, built by Andrew Burrell at Deptford and launched in 1620.

Garland fought at the Battle of Dungeness in 1652, where the Dutch captured her.
