= Jacob Binckes =

Dutch States Navy officer (1637–1677)

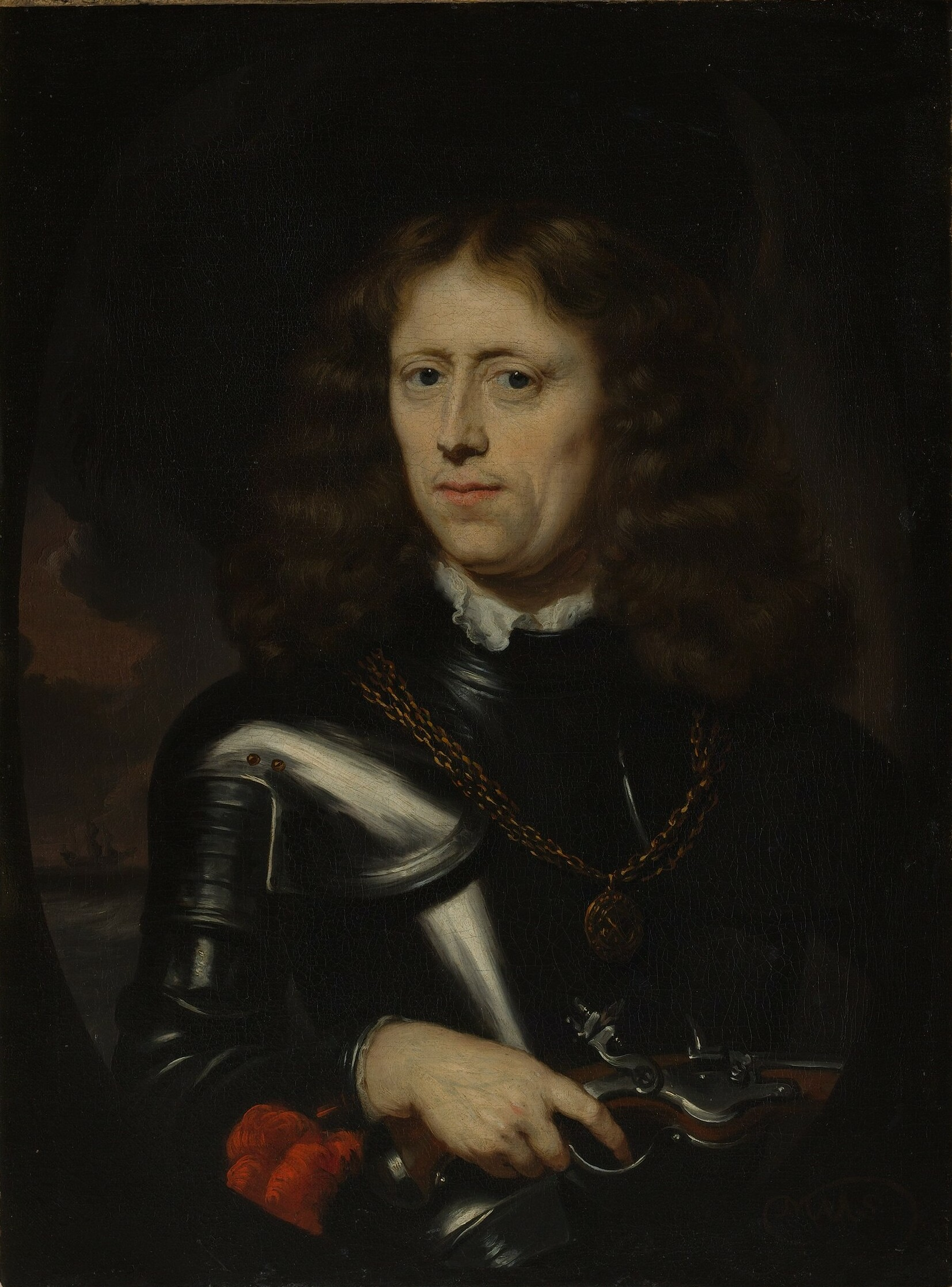
1676 portrait of Binckes by Nicolaes Maes

Jacob Binckes (1637 – 11 December 1677) was a Dutch States Navy officer. He began his career at sea serving on merchants ships which transported Norwegian wood to the Dutch Republic. In 1665 Binckes joined the Dutch navy and was assigned to the Admiralty of Amsterdam. His first assignment as a naval captain was to escort a Dutch convoy to Norway during the Second Anglo-Dutch War. In 1666 he helped make the Elbe secure for Dutch merchant shipping. Binckes participated in the raid on the Medway in June 1667 during the Second Anglo-Dutch War, commanding the frigate Essen.

During the Third Anglo-Dutch War, together with Vice-admiral Cornelis Evertsen the Youngest Binckes led a Dutch squadron which destroyed part of the English colony of Virginia's annual tobacco fleet at the Second Battle of the James River in July 1673 before they recaptured the former New Netherland capital of New Amsterdam, which had been renamed New York after it had surrendered to English forces in 1664, on 9 August. In 1674 the Treaty of Westminster ended the Third Anglo-Dutch War and in 1675 Binckes was made commander of a Dutch fleet which went to the Baltic to support Denmark–Norway against Sweden in the Scanian War.

During the Franco-Dutch War, Binckes (captaining the ship of the line Beschermer) defeated a French fleet at the First Battle of Tobago on 3 February 1677, but was killed in action at the Second Battle of Tobago on 11 December. During the second battle a mortar hit the powder storage inside Fort Sterreschans and killed Binckes and many others. Binckes allegedly served as one of the inspirations for the character of Robinson Crusoe in the 1719 novel of the same name by Daniel Defoe.
