= Cornelis Evertsen the Younger =

Dutch States Navy officer

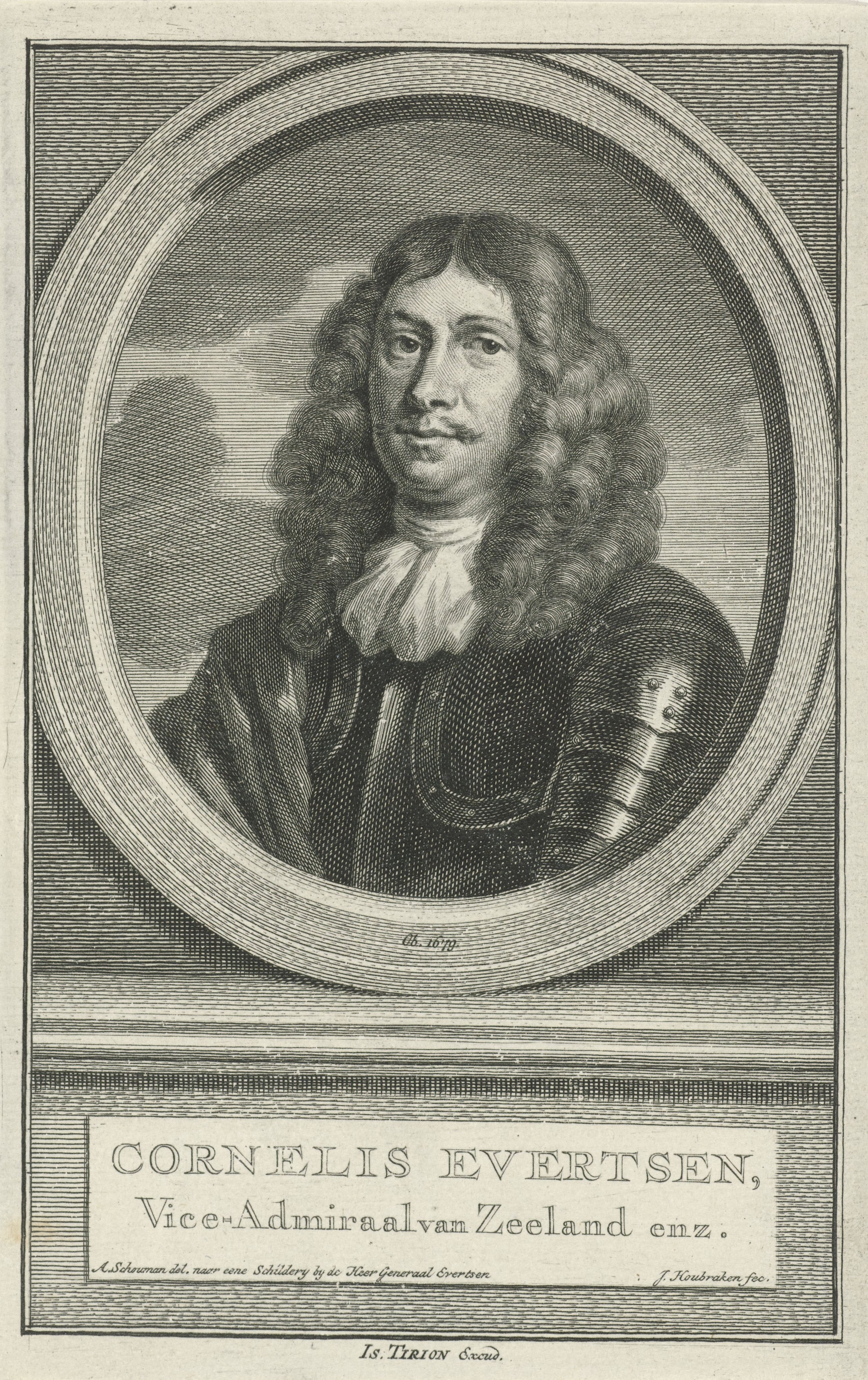
Cornelis Evertsen the Younger

Cornelis Evertsen the Younger (Flushing, 16 April 1628 – Flushing, 20 September 1679) was a Dutch States Navy officer of the 17th century.

Cornelis was the son of Lieutenant-Admiral Johan Evertsen and the nephew of Lieutenant-Admiral Cornelis Evertsen the Elder. He is not to be confused with his cousin Lieutenant-Admiral Cornelis Evertsen the Youngest.

Cornelis became master on his father's flagship the Hollandia in 1648; in 1651 he was for a time in the rank of lieutenant acting captain on the same vessel. He became captain of the Vlissingen in 1652, during the First Anglo–Dutch War. In 1653 he was wounded while being his father's flag captain in the Battle of Scheveningen. In 1659 he became a full captain. In 1661 he sailed in the Mediterranean as captain of the Delft.

In July 1665, after the Battle of Lowestoft during the Second Anglo-Dutch War, he was appointed Rear-Admiral with the Admiralty of Zealand. He fought on the Zierikzee in the Four Days Battle. He became Vice-Admiral of Zealand on 5 September 1666, the year in which his father and uncle were killed. He did not participate in the Raid on the Medway in 1667, because the Zealandic fleet wasn't ready in time.

He fought in all battles of the Third Anglo-Dutch War on his flagship, the Zierikzee.

In the Franco-Dutch War he participated in the failed attack against Martinique in 1674 under De Ruyter. In 1676 he fought for Denmark under Admiral-General Cornelis Tromp, then the Danish supreme commander, against Sweden. And in 1678 he operated against the French fleet in the Mediterranean and before the French West coast. Coming around Wissant on their way to Spain in 1678, a squadron of nine ships under Evertsen had an encounter with a French squadron under Châteaurenault of almost equal strength, during which, in spite of the violent storm, there was fierce fighting and they did each other quite some damage. However, neither side lost a ship.

Cornelis was an educated man who twice married wives from wealthy families; he died of an illness in Flushing.

== Sources ==
- Van Lennep, Jacob (1880). De geschiedenis van Nederland, aan het Nederlandsche Volk verteld [The history of the Netherlands, told to the Dutch nation] (in Dutch). Leiden; z.j.
