= English ship Fortune (1652) =

History

Kingdom of France
- Name: La Fortunee
- Captured: 1652
- Fate: Taken from 'pirate' though may have been a Royalist

Commonwealth of England
- Name: Fortune
- Acquired: 1652
- Commissioned: 1652
- Honours and awards: Dungeness 1652; Portland 1653
- Fate: Sold 1654

General characteristics
- Class & type: 36-gun fourth rate
- Sail plan: ship-rigged
- Complement: 100
- Armament: 36 guns

Fortune was a 36-gun fourth rate vessel captured from pirates or may have been in the service of Royalists by the Commonwealth of England, She was captured in 1652 as the 36-gun La Fortunnee. She was commissioned into the Parliamentary Naval Force as Fortune. She participated in the Battle of Dungeness and the Battle of Portland. She was sold 1654.

Fortune was the eighth named vessel since it was used for a 100-ton bm ship in service in 1512.

== Specifications ==
Her dimensional data is unknown. Her gun armament was 36 guns. Her manning was 100 personnel.

== Commissioned service ==
=== Service in the Commonwealth Navy ===
She was commissioned into the Parliamentary Navy in 1652 under the command of Captain Anthony Spatchurst. Later in 1652 she was under command of Captain William Tatnell. She partook in the Battle of Dungeness on 30 November 1652 and the Battle of Portland from 18 to 20 February 1653. During the battle Captain Tatnell was killed. Later Captain Anthony Archer took command.

== Disposition ==
Fortune was sold 1654.
