= Johan Evertsen =

Dutch admiral (1600–1666)

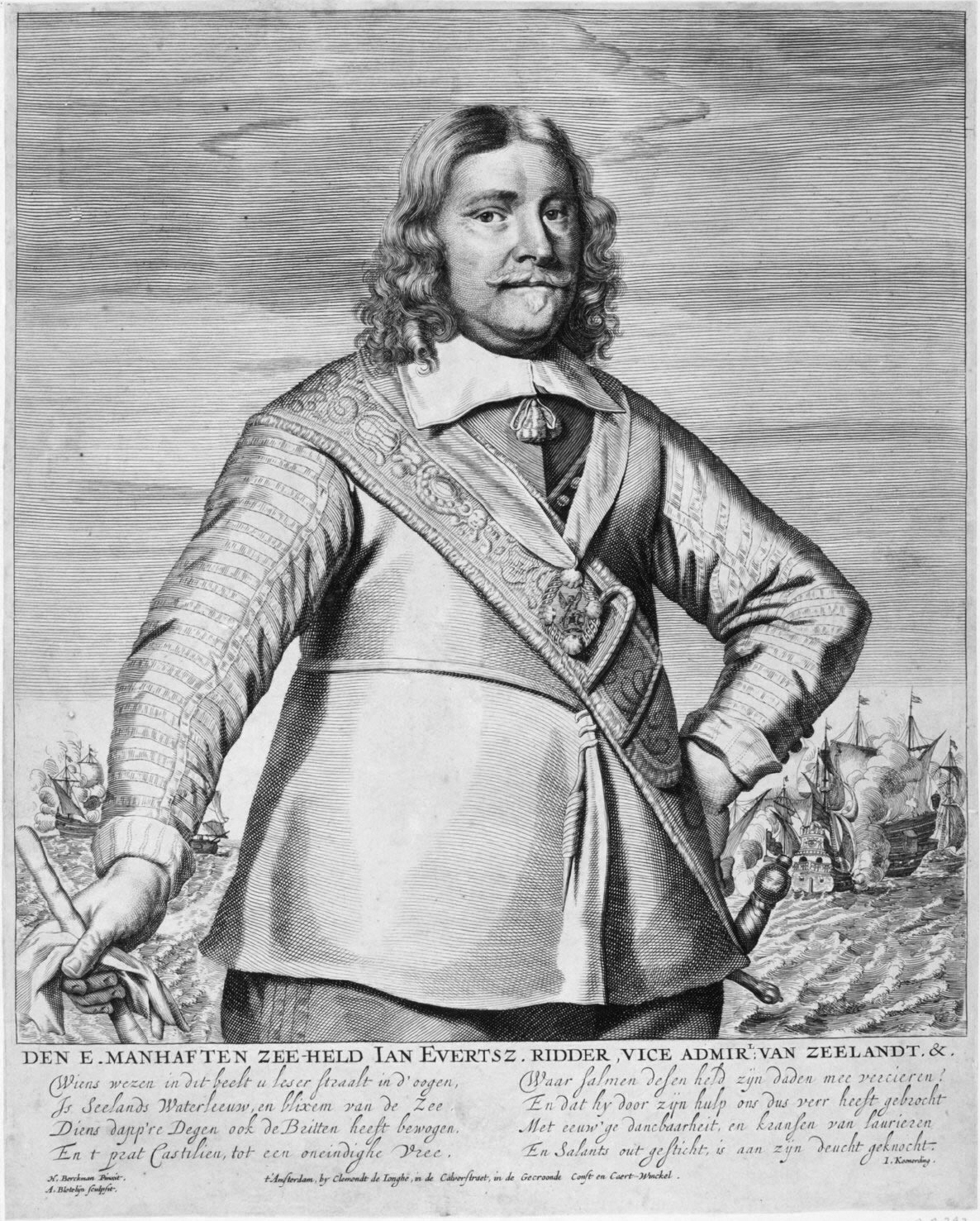
Admiral Johan Evertsen engraving

Johan Evertsen (1 February 1600 – 5 August 1666) was a Dutch admiral who was born in the 17th century.

== Early life ==
Like his five brothers, Evertsen started his military career as a lieutenant after the death of his father, "Captain Jan". He quickly moved through the ranks, fighting battles with corsairs and protecting Dutch ships from other privateers. Evertsen was eventually promoted to the rank of admiral during the Anglo-Dutch Wars. Despite Evertsen's successes and influence in the Dutch Navy, his abilities were questioned due to rumours that he was a coward.

== Career ==
Evertsen was born in Vlissingen. He was the eldest (surviving) son of Johan Evertsen, also known as Captain Jan who died in 1617 fighting near La Rochelle against a French corsair. In gratitude for the services he rendered, all five sons of Captain Jan were named lieutenants by the Admiralty of Zeeland.

At age 18, he was made captain of a ship. He fought near La Rochelle in 1625 under Willem de Zoete, and in 1626 and 1627 in a campaign against the Barbary Coast under Laurens Reael.

Between 1628 and 1636, he distinguished himself while fighting the Dunkirk corsairs. His greatest successes were in 1628, when he prevented the Dunkirkers from intercepting the captured treasure fleet of Piet Heyn and in 1636, when he captured corsair Jacob Collaert. He also played an important part in the Dutch victory in the Battle of the Slaak against the Spanish.

In the wake of this battle, he came into conflict with Witte Corneliszoon de With, and receive no other important commands. During this time, he developed a friendship with stadtholders Frederick Henry and William II.

=== First Anglo-Dutch War ===
At the outbreak of the First Anglo-Dutch War, Evertsen was left aside by de With, who considered him an orangist. But after de With's defeat in the Battle of the Kentish Knock, de With was replaced by Maarten Tromp, who reinstated Evertsen as a squadron commander. Evertsen helped to achieve victory in the Battle of Dungeness, extricating Tromp's flagship from an English attack.

In 1653, he fought the last Battle of Portland and Battle of the Gabbard.

The final Battle of Scheveningen was also lost and Tromp was killed in battle. Evertsen's ship was so badly damaged that he had to withdraw and leave the command to de With. Because he withdrew, Evertsen was accused of cowardice by de With, and he received no commands for the next 5 years.

In May 1659, Evertsen sailed under Michiel de Ruyter in the fleet that assisted Jacob van Wassenaer Obdam in reconquering the Danish islands after they had been lost in the Battle of the Sound, in which de With was killed.

=== Second Anglo-Dutch War ===
Despite his age, Johan Evertsen was third in command of the fleet that faced the English in the Battle of Lowestoft. The battle went horribly wrong for the Dutch, and the first and second in command, Jacob van Wassenaer Obdam and Egbert Bartholomeusz Kortenaer, were killed. Evertsen became commander, but the confusion in the Dutch fleet was so great, that Cornelius Tromp did the same. By evening, the Dutch fleet was in full flight.

Evertsen was summoned to The Hague. When he travelled there, he was dragged from his carriage by an angry mob, mistreated, bound hand and foot, and thrown into the water. He saved himself by clinging to the stern of a ship. He had to be escorted for his protection by an armed detachment to Den Helder, where he was tried for cowardice.

The commanders of the fleet spoke out in his favour, and when it became clear that Evertsen had prevented the worst possible scenario by covering the retreat of the fleet, receiving 150 bullet impacts in his ship, he was released.

When Johan's brother Cornelis Evertsen the Elder was killed in the Four Days' Battle, Johan joined the fleet and took command of the vanguard of De Ruyter. He was killed on the first day of the St James's Day Battle.

After much conflict between the Admiralty and the family over the costs, both brothers were buried in 1681 in the Abbey of Middelburg, where their shared grave memorial remains.

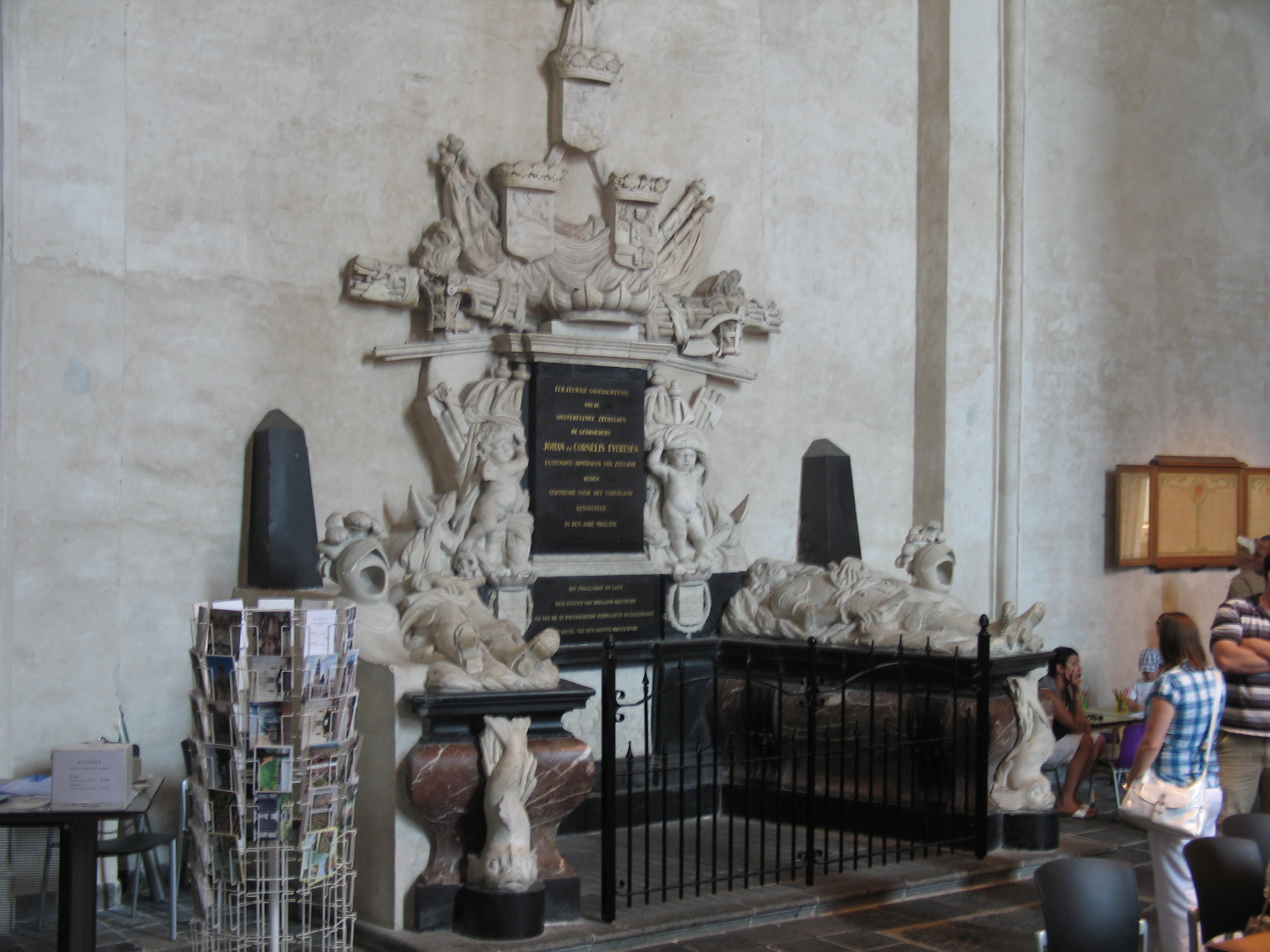
Tomb monument of Johan and Cornelis Evertsen in Middelburg

== Personal life ==
Johan married Maayken Gorcum (1600–1671). They had five children, Johan Evertsen, the younger (1624–1649), Cornelis Evertsen the Younger (1628–1679), vice-admiral and three daughters.
