= Admiralty of Zeeland =

The Admiralty of Zeeland was one of the five admiralties of the navy of the Dutch Republic. Some of its famous admirals include, Cornelis Evertsen the Youngest, Cornelis Evertsen the Elder, and Joost Banckert. The Admiralty of Zeeland was disestablished in 1795, alongside the other admiralties.

== Board of the Zeeland Admiralty ==
The Zeeland Admiralty was established in 1584, and had its seat at Middelburg. Zeeland had seven seats in its Board of Admiralty, Holland two, Utrecht one. Its direct responsibilities regarded the area of the modern province of Zeeland.

== Admiralty shipyards ==
The Zeeland admiralty had shipyards in Middelburg, Veere, Vlissingen and Zierikzee. On these shipyards the construction, equipping, maintenance and supply of warships was handled. The shipyards in Vlissingen and Veere were the most important.

== Known admirals ==
- c. 1588: Justin of Nassau, lieutenant admiral
- c. 1588: Joos de Moor, vice admiral
