= HMS Saint Patrick =

Ship of the line of the Royal Navy

History

England
- Name: HMS Saint Patrick
- Ordered: 15 April 1665 (contract)
- Builder: Francis Bayley, Bristol
- Launched: 9 May 1666
- Commissioned: 10 June 1666
- Captured: 5 February 1667, by Dutch Navy

Dutch Republic
- Name: Zwanenburg
- Acquired: 5 February 1667

General characteristics
- Class & type: 50-gun fourth-rate ship of the line
- Tons burthen: 621
- Length: 102 ft (31 m) (keel)
- Beam: 33 ft 10 in (10.31 m)
- Depth of hold: 14 ft 6 in (4.42 m)
- Sail plan: Full-rigged ship
- Armament: nominally 50 guns; actually carried 48 guns comprising 20 × 24-pounders, 2 culverins, 22 demi-culverins and 4 sakers

HMS Saint Patrick was a 50-gun fourth-rate ship of the line of the English Royal Navy. In 1665, during the Second Anglo-Dutch War, the Navy Committee of Parliament adopted a supplement to their 1664 Programme which provided for one third rate (Warspite) and three fourth rates. The King's chronic financial worries led to the cancellation of the contracts for two of the fourth rates, but the remaining vessel, awarded to Bristol shipbuilder Francis Bayley, was completed in barely a year at the contract price of £6 per ton, measuring slightly larger than her contract dimensions of 100 ft keel length and 32 ft 6 in breadth. Launched in May 1666 at Bristol, the ship proved an outstanding success as a fast, weatherly sailing warship.

Commissioned a month after her launch under Captain Robert Saunders, the Saint Patrick joined Sir Robert Robinson's squadron on Christmas Day 1666. However, less than nine months after being launched, she was captured off the North Foreland on 5 February 1667 by the Dutch 34-gun Delft and 28-gun Shakerlo, after a battle which left Saunders and 8 of his crew dead and another 16 wounded. She was commissioned by the Dutch States Navy later in 1667 as the Zwanenburg.
