= Cornelis Evertsen the Elder =

Dutch admiral (1610-1666)

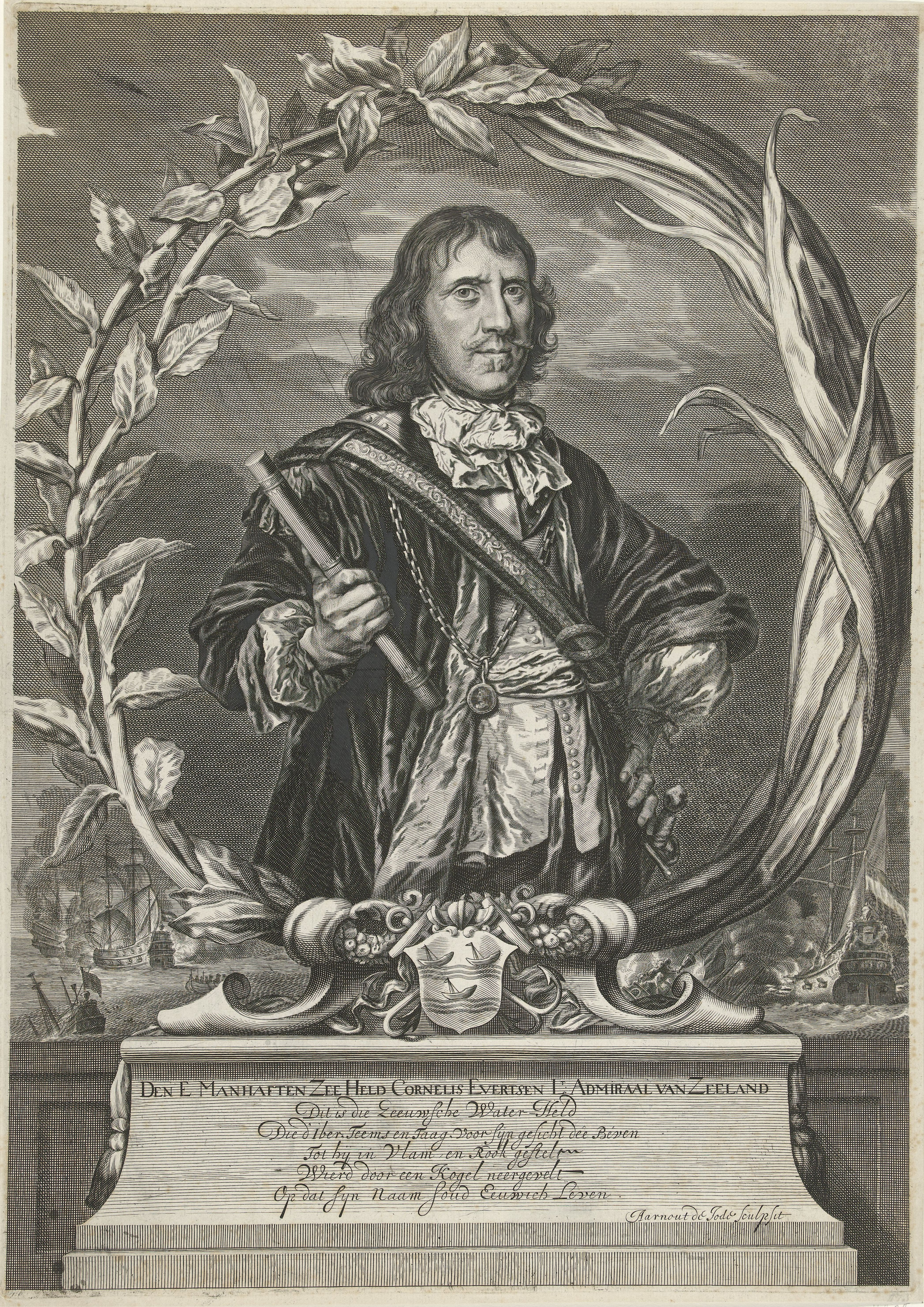
Cornelis Evertsen the Elder, engraving after a painting by Pieter Borsseler

Cornelis Evertsen the Elder (4 August 1610 – 11 June 1666) was a Dutch admiral.

Cornelis Evertsen the Elder was the son of Johan Evertsen and Maayken Jans; grandson of Evert Heindricxsen, a Watergeus, both commanders of men-of-war of the navy of Zealand.

When his father was killed in battle in 1617, the Admiralty of Zealand appointed all five of his sons as Lieutenant, including Cornelis (or Kees) and his oldest brother Johan, despite their young age. This exceptional favour was granted in recognition of the great merits of the father and of course prevented his family from becoming destitute.

In 1626 Cornelis is first mentioned as actually serving on sea, during a privateering raid. On 25 August 1636 he was appointed captain. In the Battle of the Downs in 1639 he captured a galleon.

During the First Anglo-Dutch War Cornelis functioned as a Vice-Commodore in the Zealandic navy; he was appointed on a confederate level to the equivalent rank of temporary Rear-Admiral on 1 May 1652. In the Battle of Scheveningen his ship sank and he, wounded, was prisoner of the English for three months.

On 14 March 1654 he was appointed Rear-Admiral. During the Northern Wars he was in 1659 subcommander of the fleet of Michiel de Ruyter and liberated Nyborg from the Swedish. In 1661 he was third in command of the Dutch Mediterranean fleet under De Ruyter, executing punitive actions against the corsairs of Algiers. He and De Ruyter were close personal friends.

When the Second Anglo-Dutch War threatened, he was made Vice-Admiral of Zealand, while his brother Johan Evertsen was promoted to the first Lieutenant-Admiral that province ever had. Cornelis Evertsen took part in the Battle of Lowestoft (13 June 1665); his elder brother was after the fight much criticised for his behaviour and had to resign as commander, though keeping his rank. Cornelis was now promoted to Lieutenant-Admiral also, so that for a time the Dutch navy had seven officers of this rank.

When the next major naval battle was fought with England in June 1666, the Four Days Battle, Cornelis the Elder was killed on the first day on the Walcheren, cut in two by the Parthian shot of the escaping Henry.

His brother Johan Evertsen decided first to stay ashore, but when Cornelis was killed, he joined as yet the fleet and took command of the vanguard of De Ruyter. He was killed on the first day of the St. James's Day Battle, in August 1666. Both brothers were, after much conflict between the Admiralty and the family over the costs, in 1681 buried in the Abbey of Middelburg, where their shared grave memorial is still to be seen.

Cornelis Evertsen the Elder had fourteen children from his first marriage in 1640 with Johanna van Gorcum, five of which died as infants. Two of them would become flag officers as well: his second child, named after him, Lieutenant-Admiral Cornelis Evertsen the Youngest (1642–1706) and the tenth son Lieutenant-Admiral Geleyn Evertsen (1655–1711). Both would be supreme commanders of the confederate Dutch fleet. All three men shared the same cantankerous character. After the death of his first wife in 1657 Cornelis remarried in 1659; from this marriage another two children were born. On his death he left a heritage worth 45,000 guilders.

== Bibliography ==
- Jonge, J. C. de, Levens-beschrijving van Johan en Cornelis Evertsen, Luitenant-Admiralen van Zeeland, ’s Gravenhage, Weduwe J. Allart & Comp., 1820.
- Shomette, Donald; Haslach, Robert D (1988). Raid on America : the Dutch naval campaign of 1672-1674. University of South Carolina Press. ISBN 978-0-78842-2454.
