= Egbert Bartholomeusz Kortenaer =

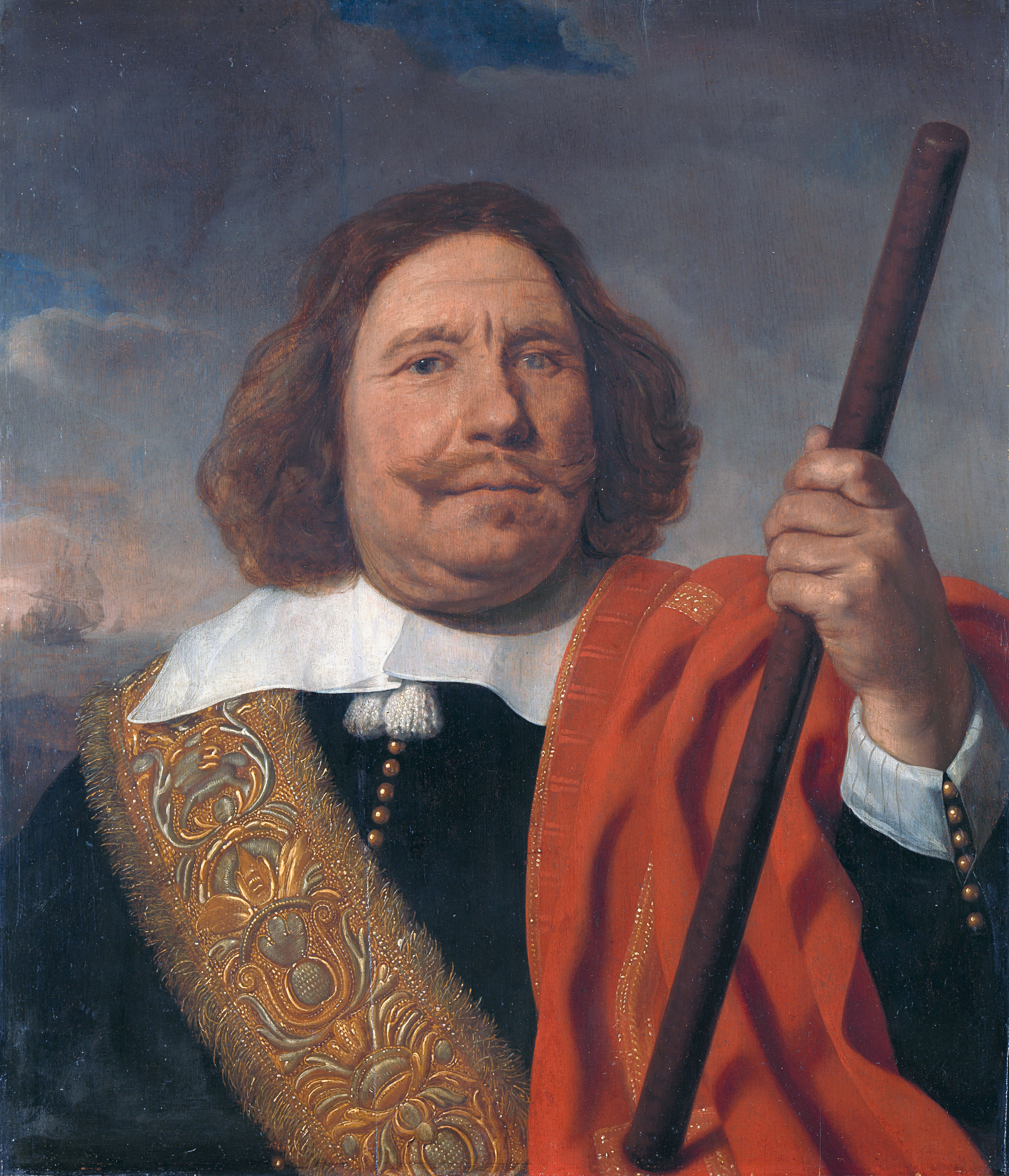
- Portrait of Egbert Meeuwsz Cortenaer, showing his blind eye and good left hand in 1660, by Bartholomeus van der Helst
- Born: 1604; Groningen
- Died: 13 June 1665 (aged 60–61) near Lowestoft

Egbert Bartholomeuszoon Kortenaer or Egbert Meussen Cortenaer (1604 – 13 June 1665) was an admiral of the United Provinces of the Netherlands who was killed in the Battle of Lowestoft.

== Biography ==
Kortenaer was born in 1604 in Groningen of humble origins. In 1626, he was made boatswain, in 1636, second mate. In the First Anglo-Dutch War, he served as first mate in 1652 on the Dutch flagship, Brederode. In the Battle of Dungeness, he lost his right hand and eye. On 10 April 1653, he was made commandeur to replace flag captain Abel Roelants when Lieutenant-Admiral Maarten Tromp used Brederode as his flagship. In the Battle of Scheveningen, Tromp was killed. Kortenaer kept Tromp's standard raised to keep up morale (this was habitual for the Dutch on such occasions) and took command of his squadron. On 21 October 1653, Kortenaer was promoted to captain. In the years after the war, he often commanded squadrons as commodore when flag officers were absent.

In the Battle of the Sound (8 November 1658), serving as flag captain on Eendragt, he beat off every Swedish attack while his commanding officer, Lieutenant-Admiral Jacob van Wassenaer Obdam, was debilitated by gout. After this heroic conduct against the Swedish, Kortenaer was promoted to vice-admiral on 8 May 1659 and knighted by Frederick III of Denmark in the Order of the Elephant. On 29 January 1665, shortly before the Second Anglo-Dutch War, he was made lieutenant-admiral of the Admiralty of de Maze. He wasn't given command of the confederate Dutch fleet because he was a supporter of the House of Orange. A British intelligence report stated, "He is the best man they have".

During the Battle of Lowestoft on 13 June 1665, Kortenaer commanded the van and was second in overall command behind Van Wassenaer. He was fatally wounded early in the battle on Groot Hollandia by a cannonball hitting his hip and buried in Rotterdam in a marble grave memorial engraved with a poem by Gerard Brandt:

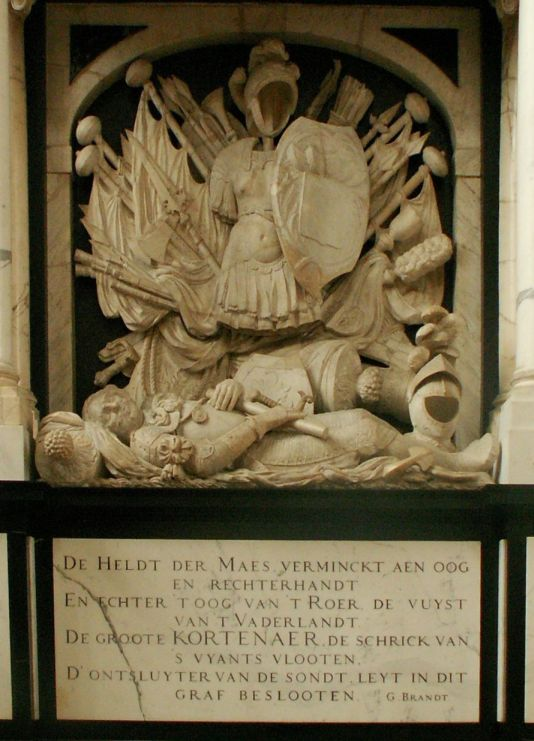
Kortenaer's grave memorial

The Hero of the Maas, bereft of eye

and his right hand

Yet of the Wheel the Eye, Fist of

the Fatherland

KORTENAER the Great, the terror

of foe's fleets

the forcer of the Sound by this grave

his country greets

== Portraits ==
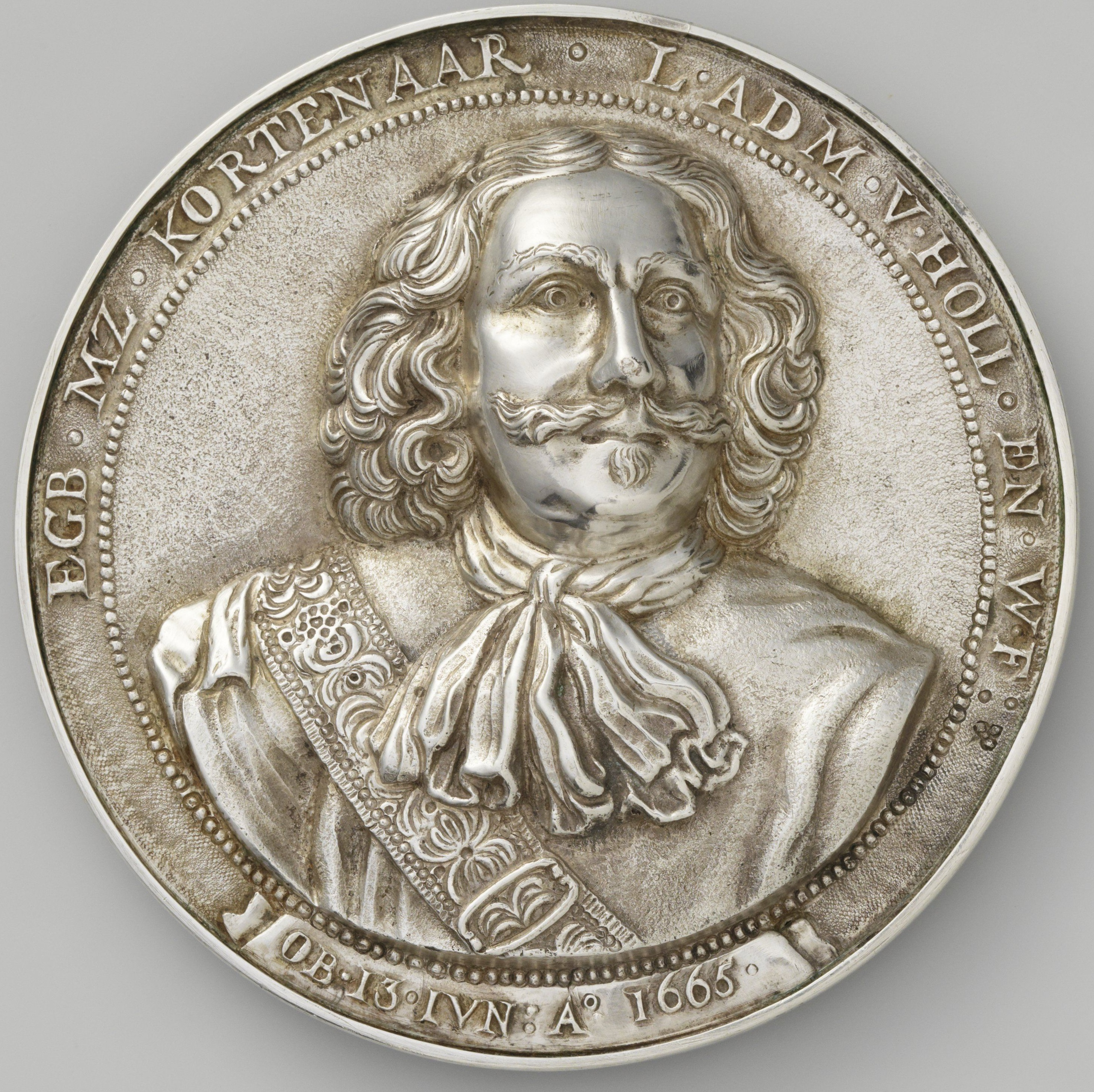
Commemorative medal by Wouter Muller, 1665

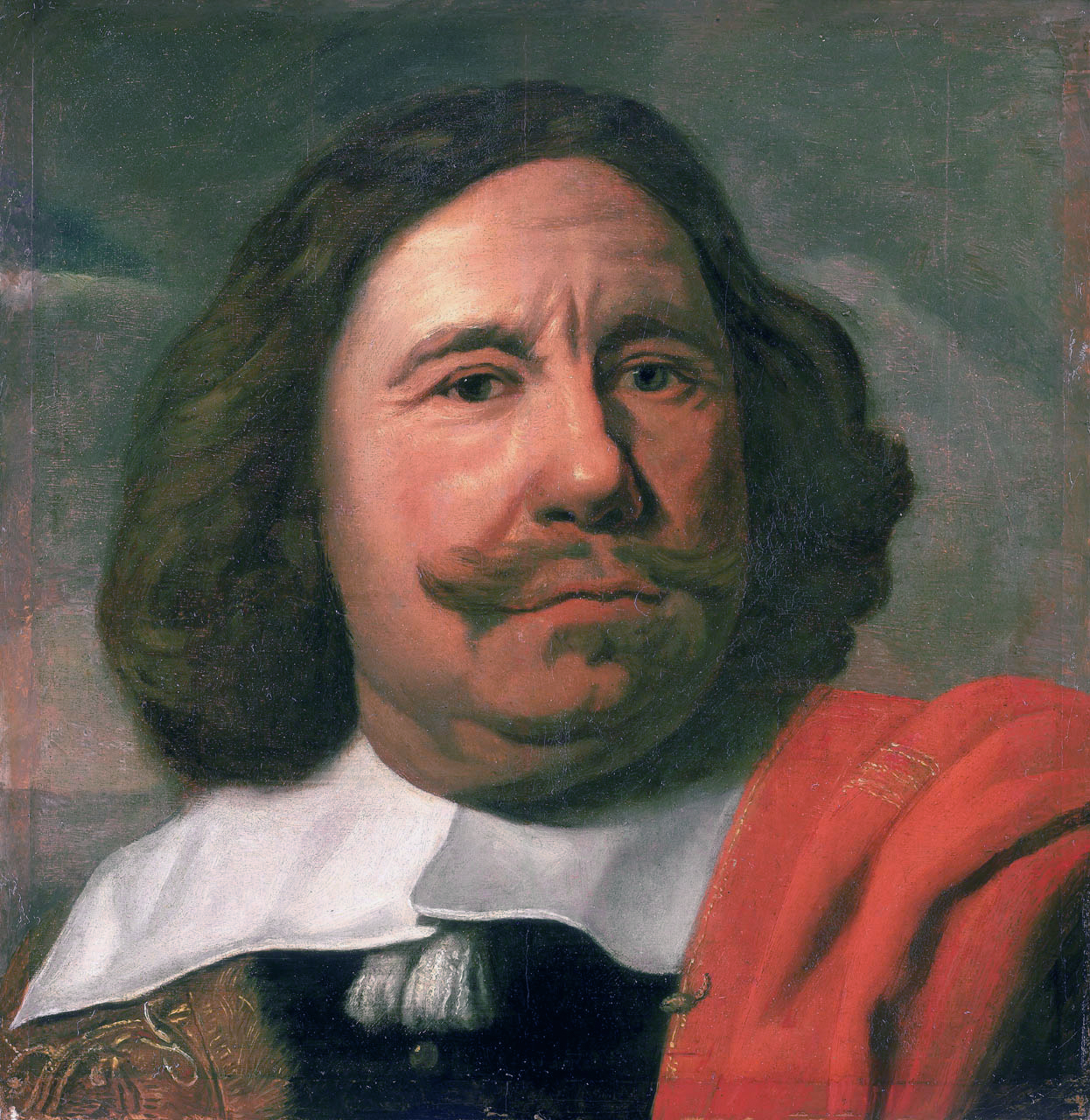
Lieutenant-Admiral Egbert Bartholomeusz Kortenaer, anonymous copy of the Van der Helst portrait, hiding his blind eye

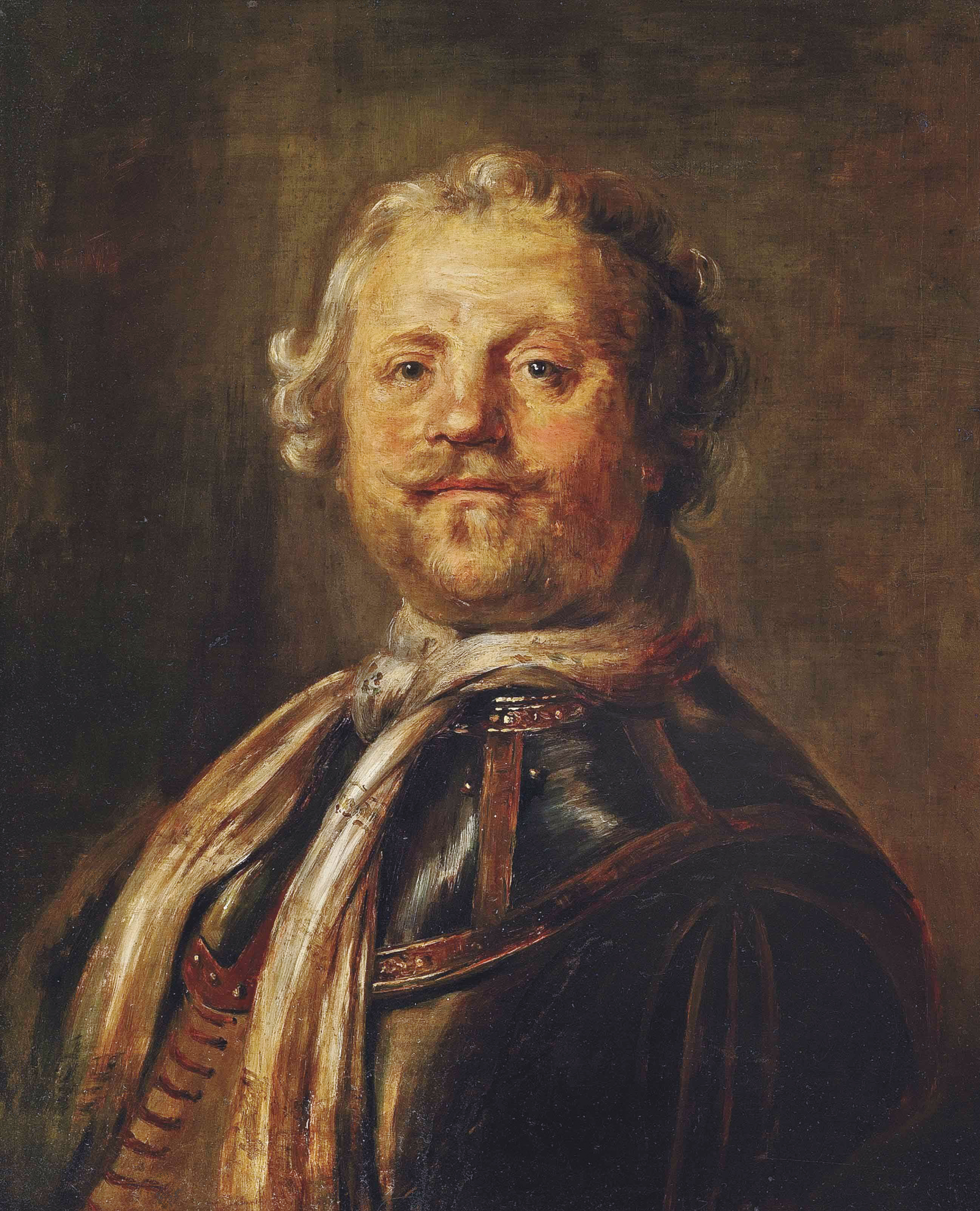
Lieutenant-Admiral Egbert Bartholomeusz Kortenaer (after a painting by Isaac Mijtens)

== HNLMS Kortenaer ==
Several ships of the Dutch navy have been named Kortenaer after the admiral,

- A late-19th century coastal defence ship
- The World War II destroyer HNLMS Kortenaer.
- An ex-British S-class destroyer, formerly HMS Scorpion, transferred in 1945
- The lead ship of the Kortenaer-class frigates
