= Pieterszoon =

Pieterszoon may refer to:

- Piet Pieterszoon Hein, Dutch naval officer
- Jan Pieterszoon Coen, Governor-General of the Dutch East Indies
- Nicolaes Pieterszoon Berchem, Dutch painter
