= Johan Carel Marinus Warnsinck =

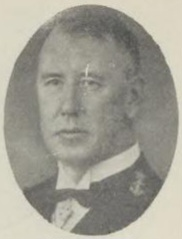
Johan Carel Marinus Warnsinck

Captain Johan Carel Marinus Warnsinck (24 November 1882 – 21 July 1943) was a Royal Netherlands Navy officer and historian. Warnsinck was the son of the notary Cornelis Warnsinck and his wife, Tettje Halbertsma. He entered the Royal Naval Academy at Den Helder in 1899 and was commissioned an officer in the Dutch navy in 1903, eventually rising to the rank of captain in 1930. In 1919, he married Catarina Elisabeth Delprat and they had one son and a daughter.

He saw naval service in the East and West Indies as well as in European waters. In the Royal Netherlands Navy, he was a hydrographic specialist. From about 1920, he began to be interested in naval history and began with a special interest in the first three Anglo-Dutch Wars. He retired from active service in 1932 and devoted the remainder of his life to the study of Dutch maritime history.

Warnsinck became a key pioneer for the academic study of maritime history in the Netherlands. In 1933, he was appointed a lecturer at the University of Amsterdam and additionally at Leiden University in 1937. In 1939, he became Professor of Maritime History at Utrecht University. For many years, he was on the Council of the Linschoten-Vereeniging (Linschoten Society) and Secretary of the Commission for maritime history of the Royal Netherlands Academy of Arts and Sciences. In 1938, he was elected an associate member of the Académie de Marine in Paris.

== Works ==
- De retourvloot van Pieter de Bitter (Kerstmis 1664-Najaar 1665) (1929)
- Reisen van Nicolaus de Graaff, gedaan naar alle gewesten des werelds, beginnende 1639 tot 1687 incluis (1930)
- Admiraal de Ruyter, de zeeslag op Schooneveld (1930).
- De geschiedenis van ons zeewezen : rede uitgesproken bij de opening zijner lessen in de geschiedenis van het zeewezen op den 30sten Mei 1933 (1933).
- De vloot van den Konig-Stadhouder 1689-1690 (1934).
- De kweekschool voor de Zeevaart en de Stuurmanskunst, 1785-1935 (1935).
- De wetenschappelijke voorbereiding van onze eerste schipvaart naar Oost-Indië (1936).
- Abraham Crijnssen: de verovering van Suriname en zijn aanslag op Virginië in 1667 (1936).
- Iaerlyck verhael van de verrichtinghen der Geoctroyeerde West-Indische Compagnie in derthien boecken (1931–37)
- Piet Heyn: generaal in dienst der West-Indische Compagnie, luitenant-admiraal van Holland, 1577-1629 (1937)
- De kapiteinsjaren van Maerten Harpertszoon Tromp (1938)
- Drie zeventiende-eeuwsche admiraals: Piet Heyn, Witte de With, Jan Evertsen (1938, 1943, 1976)
- Itinerario: voyage ofte schipvaert van Jan Huygen van Linschoten naer Oost ofte Portugaels Indien, 1579-1592; *Dl. 4-5*Reys-gheschrift vande navigatien der Portugaloysers / uitg. door J.C.M. Warnsinck (1939)
- De zeeoorlog van Holland en Zeeland tegen de Wendische steden der Duitse Hanze 1438-1441 (1939)
- Een mislukte aanslag op Nederlands Brazilië, 1639-1640 (1940)
- Twaalf doorluchtige zeehelden (1941)
- De reis om de wereld van Joris van Spilbergen, 1614-1617 (1943)
- Straat- en bochtvaarders : zijnde het korte historiael ende journaels aenteyckeninge van drie voyagiens(1943)
