= Joost Banckert =

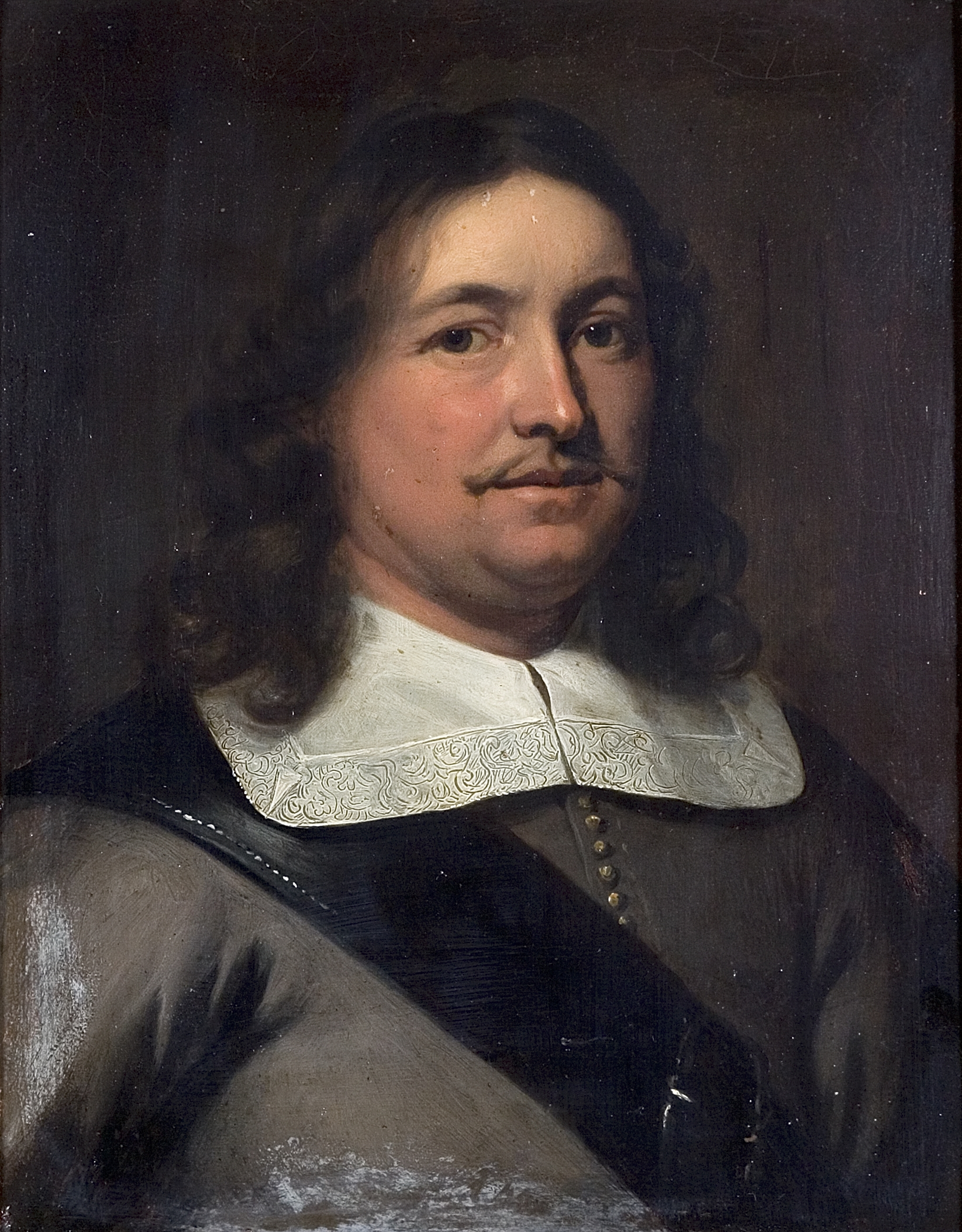

Joost van Trappen Banckert (c.1597 – 12 September 1647) was a Dutch vice admiral who spent most of his career in the service of the admiralty of Zeeland.

He was born in Vlissingen in 1597 or 1599. Early in his career, he was active against the Dunkirkers and was promoted to captain in 1624. That year he took service with the Zeeland Chamber of the Dutch West India Company (WIC), remaining there until 1636. He defeated four Spanish galleons in 1626 when commander of a squadron of three ships taking or sinking three of them, he also repeatedly defeated the Dunkirk corsairs Banckert often fought together with Piet Hein, with whom he attacked and captured the Portuguese settlement Salvador on the coast of Brazil in 1624 and as a vice admiral helped capture the Spanish treasure fleet in the Bay of Matanzas in 1628. Thanks to these and other feats he earned the nicknames "Scourge of the Marranos" (the latter word then being used as a pejorative nickname for the Spanish in general) and "Terror of the Portuguese".

Having rejoined the navy, he was promoted to rear-admiral on 3 May 1637, being a vice-admiral in the WIC not entailing an equivalent rank in the navy. From 1 October 1637 to 11 January 1638, he was a temporary vice-admiral. In 1639, again a rear-admiral, he served under Lieutenant-Admiral Maarten Tromp and was present at the first skirmish (the action of 18 September 1639) against a large Spanish fleet in the English Channel and the subsequent Battle of the Downs. He again served the WIC from 1645 until his death. He again attained the navy rank of temporary vice-admiral on 10 December 1646. In 1647 he once again set sail for the coast of Brazil.

On the return voyage, he suddenly fell ill and died at sea. He was married to Adriana Janssen. His sons were Lieutenant-Admiral Adriaen Banckert; Captain Joost Banckert de Jonge, who was killed at the Battle of Portland; and Captain Jan Banckert, who was killed on the Delft in the Battle of Lowestoft.
