= Dutch ship Brederode =

Two Dutch ships of one or other of the five regional Admiralties within the United Provinces of the Netherlands have borne the name Brederode, named after Johan Wolfert van Brederode, the brother-in-law of stadtholder Frederick Henry, Prince of Orange :

- The 46-gun ship of the line Brederode (1644) built at Rotterdam for the Maas Admiralty in 1644 and was sunk in action in 1658
- The 52-gun ship of the line Brederode (1731) built at Amsterdam for the Admiralty of Amsterdam in 1731, which was sold to be broken up in 1751
