= Battle in the Bay of São Salvador =

Coordinates: 12.877°S 38.577°W

- Part of the Dutch invasions of Brazil
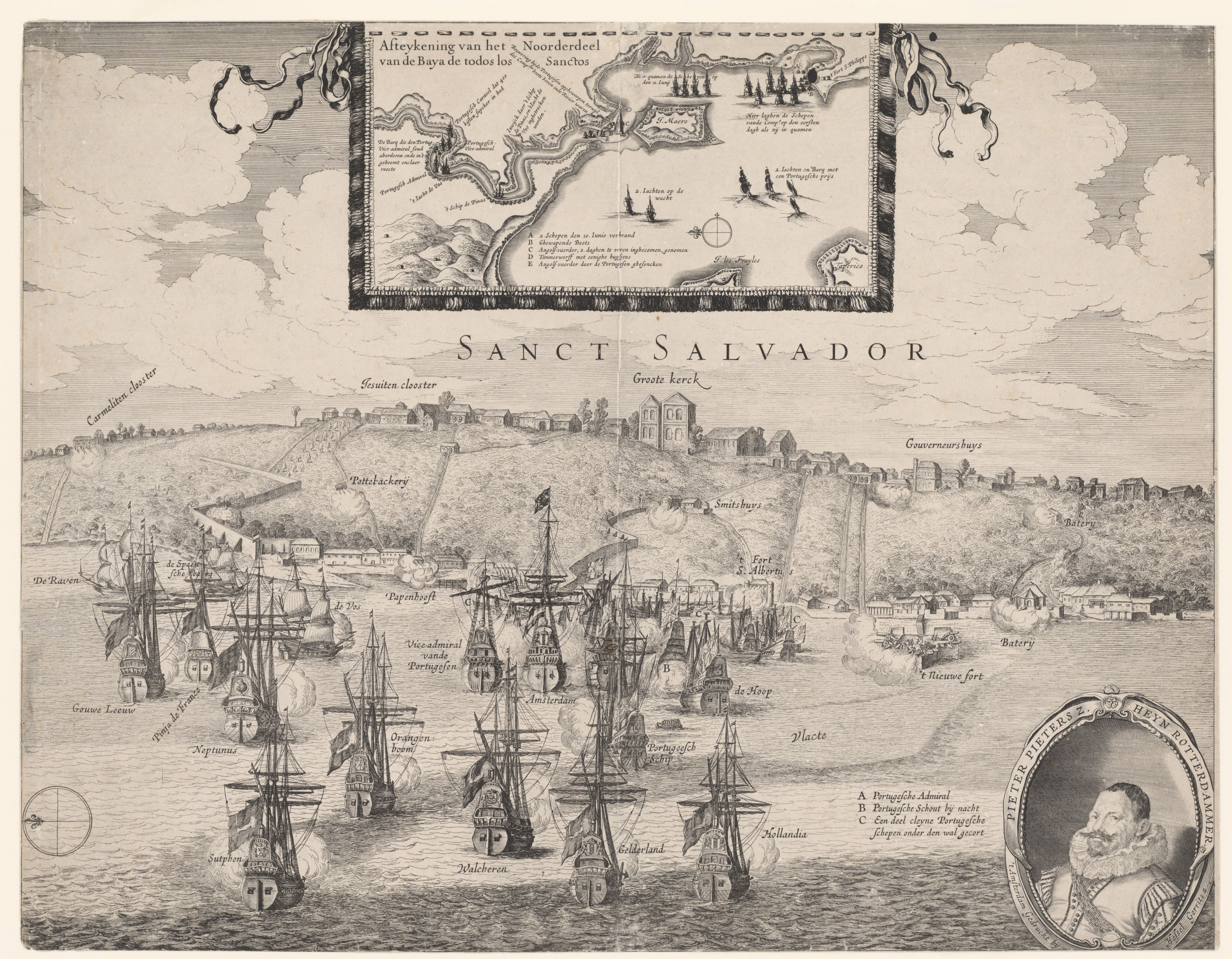
- Capture of Bahia, and this battle.
| Date | 3 March 1627 |
| Location | Bay of All Saints |
| Result | Dutch victory |

Belligerents
| Portugal | Dutch Republic: West India Company |

Commanders and leaders
| Unknown | (Dutch West India Company) Piet Pieterszoon Hein |

Strength
| 34 Ships | 3 Ships |

Casualties and losses
| 22–25 captured | None |

The Battle in the Bay of São Salvador took place on 3 March 1627 when Piet Pieterszoon Hein and his crew spotted about 34 enemy vessels at São Salvador. 16 of the ships were armed but Hein with his three vessels sailed right into the middle after a long battle the Dutch captured 22-25 of the ships with 2,700 chests of sugar, tobacco, and cotton. It was a brilliant success
