= Witte de With =

Dutch States Navy officer (1599–1658)

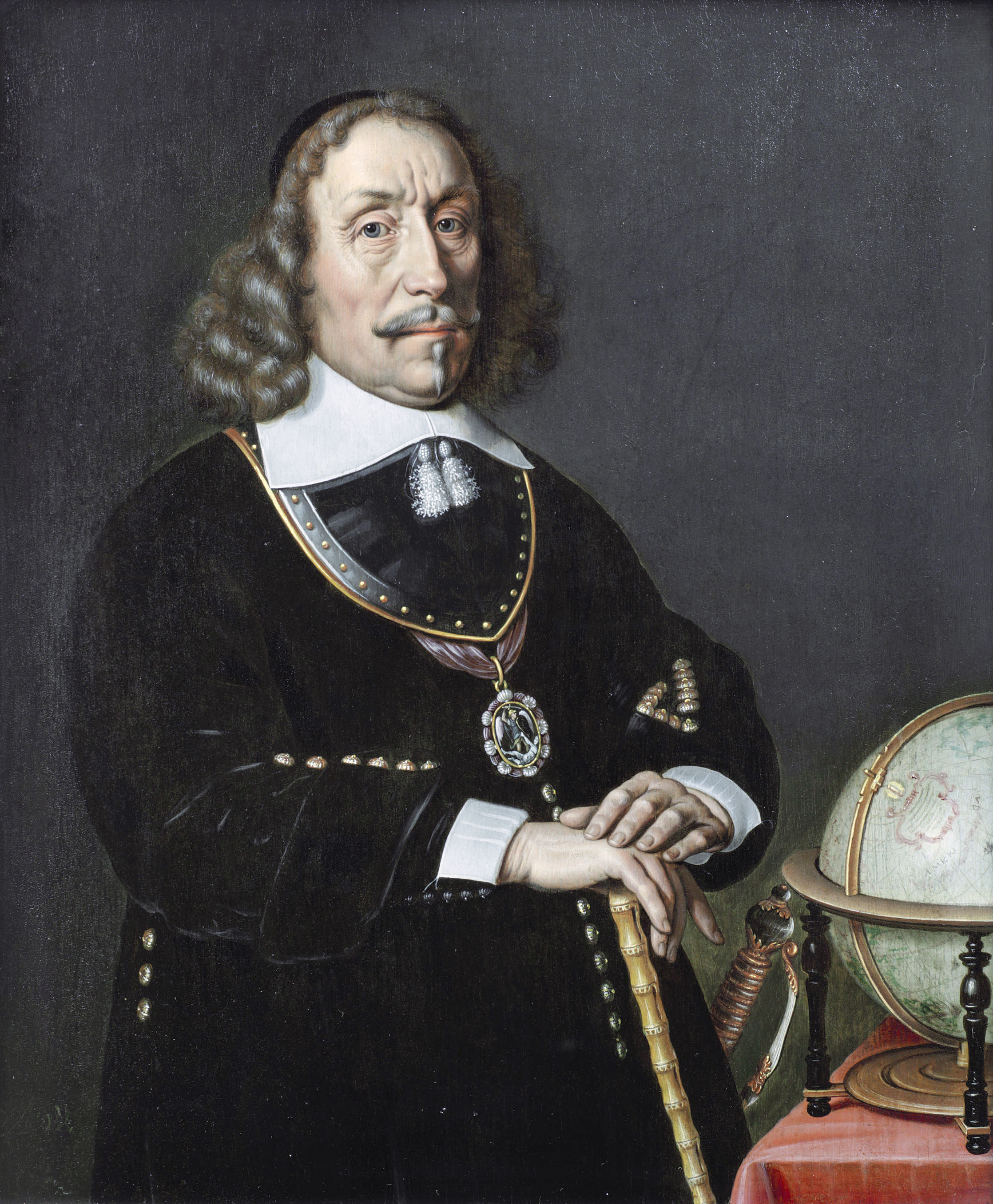
- Portrait by Abraham van Westerveld
- Born: Witte Corneliszoon de With; 28 March 1599; Brielle, Dutch Republic
- Died: 8 November 1658 (aged 59); Øresund, Denmark
- Burial place: Grote or Sint-Laurenskerk, Rotterdam
- Military career
- Allegiance: Dutch Republic
- Service years: 1616–1658
- Nickname: Dubbelwit
- Conflicts: Eighty Years' War; Battle in the Bay of Matanzas; Fight in the Channel; Battle of the Downs; First Anglo-Dutch War; Battle of the Kentish Knock; Battle of the Gabbard; Battle of Scheveningen; Second Northern War; Siege of Danzig; Battle of the Sound (DOW)

Witte Corneliszoon de With (28 March 1599 – 8 November 1658) was a Dutch States Navy officer who served during the Eighty Years' War and the First Anglo-Dutch War.

== Early life and childhood ==
De With was born on a farmstead in the hamlet of Hoogendijk near Brielle or Brill, the very town in which Maarten Tromp had been born a year earlier. According to legend, they were friends or even already rivals in their youth, but there is no proof of this. His father died in 1602, leaving behind three sons, besides Witte also Abraham and Andries, and a daughter Catharina. The De With family were Mennonites and strict pacifists; in 1610, Witte, as an anabaptist not yet baptised, obtained a baptism by a Calvinist preacher so that he would no longer feel constrained in using violence, as he was by nature not a peace-seeking boy.

After some failed minor jobs, he went on his first sea voyage to the Dutch East Indies on 21 January 1616 when he was sixteen, as a cabin boy on Captain Geen Huygen Schapenham's ship the Gouden Leeuw, part of a Dutch East India Company (VOC) fleet of five vessels. He arrived at Bantam on 13 November 1616.

Until October 1617, he participated in two trade voyages to Coromandel in India. Afterwards, he became manservant of governor Jan Pieterszoon Coen. He served as a corporal during the siege of Jakarta in 1618. On 8 October 1618, he sailed home on the Gouden Leeuw, returning to Brill on 23 May 1619. On 20 August 1620, he took service with the Admiralty of the Maze as a schipper (then the highest NCO rank), still under Schapenham on the Gelderland. From December 1620, the Gelderland participated in an expedition by Admiral Willem Haultain de Zoete against the Barbary Corsairs, returning in August 1621.

In spring 1622, De With was appointed lieutenant on Schapenham's vessel. When the latter became ill, De With functioned as commandeur, acting captain, of the Gelderland during convoy duty in the Baltic. When Schapenham recovered, De With served for a short period on the Maurits to protect the herring fleet.

In July 1622, De With became flag captain of Delft of now Vice-Admiral Schapenham, who, from 29 April 1623, carried out the spectacular raid organised by the Admiralty of Amsterdam, sending the so-called "Nassau fleet" against the Spanish possessions on the west coast of America; this fleet rounded Cape Horn in March 1624. On his first voyage as a captain, De With already showed he was the strict disciplinarian of later legend: on 13 April, six of his men deserted his ship and the constant beatings and floggings to flee to the uninhabited island of Juan Fernández. Until October, the fleet attacked Spanish shipping and settlements; during one of the actions, De With was wounded by a musket bullet. Then, it crossed the Pacific, sailing via the Mariana Islands to the Indies.

Reaching Ternate in the Spice Islands on 5 March 1625, De With, himself on request of the governor of Ambon in a punitive action, laid waste to the island, destroying by his own count 90,000 clove trees of the inhabitants, to increase the price of this commodity. He departed for the Republic on 6 February 1626, after the death of Schapenham, as Vice-Admiral (in service of the Verenigde Oostindische Compagnie) of a Spice Fleet of four ships, then worth five million guilders. He returned on 22 September 1626, thus having circumnavigated the globe, a feat in which he took much personal pride. On his return, he learned that his mother and sister had died; he remained on shore for one and a half years.

== Capture of Spain's treasure fleet ==
In 1627, De With married for the first time, with his second cousin Maria de With from Nieuwenhoorn. In April 1628, their first child, Cornelis, died. The same year, De With, entering the service of the WIC, became flag captain on the Amsterdam to Admiral Piet Heyn during an expedition from 20 May to capture the Spanish treasure fleet. In September this attack was successful near Cuba. On 10 January 1629 the fleet returned to the Republic. Out of the bounty of eleven million guilders, De With was granted about 500 guilders, with which he was very dissatisfied, as he imputed to himself a crucial role in the capture by taking a barque in August, the crew of which provided essential information regarding the whereabouts of the treasure fleet.

In 1629, the five Dutch admiralties refused to allow Heyn, effectively their new supreme commander, to enlarge his staff with a special tactical-operational officer, for which function Heyn had De With in mind. De With now hoped to be appointed flag captain on the Vlieghende Groene Draeck, but Admiral Maerten Tromp was chosen instead. De With was made captain of the Prins Hendrik in June; the same month Heyn was killed in action. Disappointed and despairing of ever being promoted, De With left direct naval service in November.

In September, his daughter Cornelia was born. From May 1630 to 1633, De With was Commodore of the Grote Visserij, the administrative body controlling and militarily protecting the Herring Fleet. The change, however, was largely a formality as regular warships were used for this task: De With remained captain of the Prins Hendrik and functioned as flag captain whenever admirals had to make use of this vessel.

In May 1631, his first wife died. In August, he remarried the eighteen-year-old Hillegonda van Goch, the daughter of a Rotterdam patrician. In 1633, his second son Cornelis was born, but the boy died in July 1634. Early in 1634, De With rejoined the navy for four months when Lieutenant-Admiral Philips van Dorp used the Prins Hendrik as his flagship for an expedition in the Gulf of Biscay. During the voyage it became clear that Vice-Admiral Jasper Liefhebber resented the domineering attitude of De With. Tensions between the two men became unbearable, and De With left his ship and thus the navy in the middle of the campaign. From October 1635 to October 1636, he was schepen in Brill; in 1636 also, his fourth child was born, Maria. In October 1637, he was appointed deacon in Brill. De With now mainly lived from rent on the land inherited from his parents, supplemented by a share in a river fishing vessel.

== Battle of the Downs ==
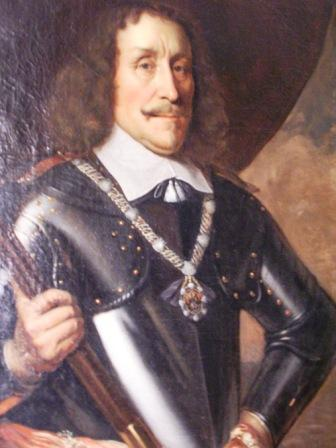
De With in 1654

Tromp as well as De With had left the navy after a conflict with Van Dorp. The two most talented Dutch navy officers were sidetracked by the attempt of stadtholder Frederick Henry to centralise the cumbersome Dutch naval administration with its five admiralties. Both Van Dorp and Liefhebber were brave men but poor managers. Overworked by the many difficulties and political strife brought by the reorganisation, they feared being replaced by the younger and more competent Tromp and De With. However, the removal of the latter only delayed the inevitable.

In the summer of 1637 the fleet supply system collapsed, bringing the hungry and thirsty sailors to the brink of a general mutiny. The Dunkirkers repeatedly broke through the Dutch blockade of Dunkirk to attack Dutch shipping. Charles I of England exploited the crisis to force Dutch North Sea herring fishers to pay for fishing permits. All that caused such an outcry that when Van Dorp offered his resignation, Frederick Henry was forced to accept it, also firing Liefhebber. He replaced them on 29 October with Tromp and De With. However, De With was again severely disappointed when he was refused supreme command. Instead, as Vice-Admiral of Holland and West Frisia, he was second in command under Lieutenant-Admiral Tromp.

De With fought under Tromp at the Battle of the Downs (1639), where the Spanish fleet was destroyed. De With became very jealous of Tromp's popularity after this victory. In the same battle, he made an enemy of Zealandic Vice-Admiral Johan Evertsen, and accused him of cowardice and avarice.

== Court martial ==
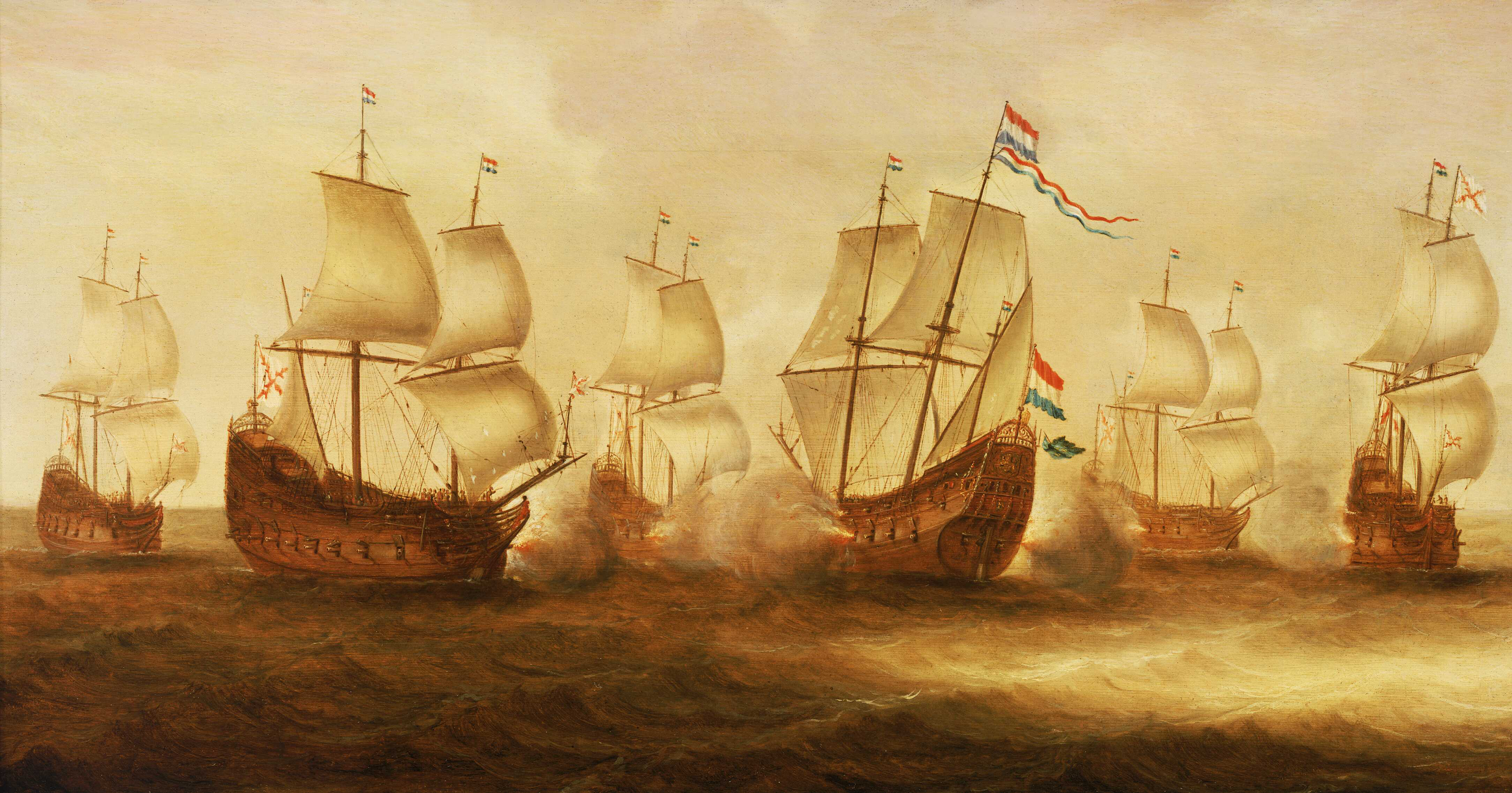
Witte de With's Action with Dunkirkers off Nieuwpoort in 1640

In 1640, De With was brought to trial when, his fleet having been dispersed by a storm, he had returned to Hellevoetsluis alone. The court martial was presided by Maarten Tromp and though he was acquitted, De With had the compulsive notion that Tromp had tried to influence witnesses against him. Both in Battle of Fehmarn (1644) and 1645, De With, along with an enormous convoy of merchantmen (702 on the return voyage of the latter year) forced the Sound against the Danes, who had tried to impose higher toll rates. After the commencement of the Torstensson War, the Dutch public openly expressed support for Sweden. Following the peace settlement, the Dutch hoped for reduced tolls, by Denmark which did not happen. This led to heightened political tensions. in the Dutch Republic. In response, a fleet comprising 48 ships under Witte de With, escorting three hundred merchant vessels, was dispatched through the Sound with the intent of paying zero tolls until the Danish lowered the tolls. De With was instructed to use force if the Danes intervened. In July 1645, he arrived, the Danish monarch wanted to see this in person, De With raised his hat when he saw him, receiving no response. The Danes perceived this as a humiliation. The Dutch fleet was in no hurry to leave, and Christian IV realized he had no choice but to concede. A treaty was subsequently signed, wherein the Danes made significant concessions. The end of the Swedish-Danish war and the Dutch naval dominance under De With in the Baltic Sea rested on the power of Andries Bicker, burgomaster of Amsterdam and member of the States General and not on that of the Stadtholder Frederik Hendrik of Orange.

In 1647, De With was sent with a poorly equipped fleet to assist the Dutch colony of Brazil from attack by the Portuguese. He refused to cooperate with the Council of Brazil and, after many months of conflict during which his fleet deteriorated through lack of supplies, he returned against orders with the two remaining seaworthy ships to the Netherlands in November 1649.

On his return, he went to the States-General to complain about the policy of the colony of Brazil but was himself arrested, charged of insubordination and desertion on 259 points and nearly condemned to decapitation. He was saved only by the intervention of the States of Holland, which pointed out their exclusive right to condemn admirals to death.

In February 1651, he was acquitted of most charges, the punishment being reduced to a loss of wages for the period involved. In September 1651, De With was again on convoy duty.

== The First Anglo-Dutch War ==
In the First Anglo-Dutch War against the Commonwealth of England, when Lieutenant-Admiral Maarten Tromp in the autumn of 1652 fell in disgrace with the States-General, De With commanded the Dutch fleet at the Battle of the Kentish Knock but failed in his mission. Morally broken, he remained ill at home for many months, while Tromp replaced him for the Battle of Dungeness and the Battle of Portland. On 8 May Tromp officially became supreme commander again and De With fought as subcommander under Tromp in the subsequent actions: the Battle of the Gabbard and the final Battle of Scheveningen in which Tromp died. De With was temporary commander between 14 August and 22 September but was denied permanent command of the Dutch fleet because of his difficult personality in favour of Lieutenant-Admiral Jacob van Wassenaer Obdam. Between 1654 and 1656 he was inactive, only sailing again for the relief of Danzig.

== Death in the Battle of the Sound ==
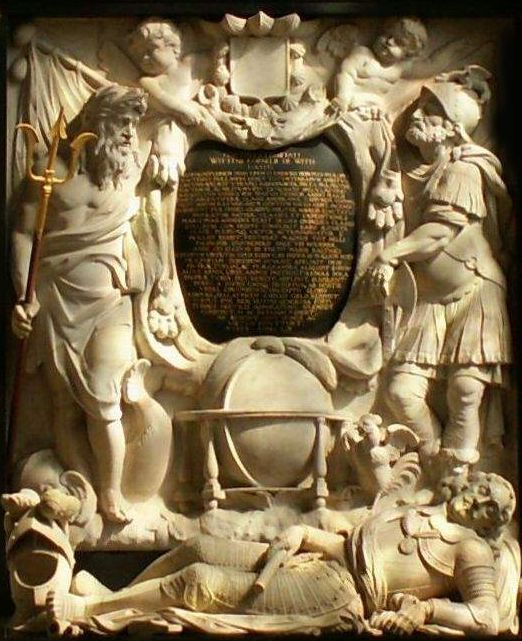
The grave memorial of Admiral Witte de With, prominently showing the globe he sailed around

De With met his end in November 1658 at the Battle of the Sound, during the Northern Wars, commanding the vanguard of the Dutch fleet relieving Copenhagen from the Swedish. His ship; the Brederode, was grounded and surrounded by the enemy at Oresund. He was first shot through the left thigh by a musket ball and hours later through the breast. When Swedish soldiers boarded the ship he refused to surrender his sword, wrestling with two of them on his knees and exclaiming: "I have faithfully wielded this sword so many years for Holland, so I won't give it up now to some common soldiers!" He collapsed, was brought to his cabin to recover, insisted on walking by himself over the gangplank to the Swedish ship, collapsed again and died. His body was embalmed on orders of Charles X of Sweden and displayed as a war trophy in the town hall of Elsinore by the Swedes, who, in January 1659, delivered his body to the Danish court in Copenhagen; after the Danes had paid their homage, it was transported to the Netherlands and buried with great pomp in Rotterdam on 7 October, in the church of St Lawrence, where the marble grave memorial, restored after being damaged by the German bombardment of 14 May 1940, can still be seen.

== The arch-rivalry with Tromp ==
De With had a lifelong rivalry with Admiral Maarten Tromp. As Dutch naval historian Johan Carel Marinus Warnsinck put it: "He was feared and hated by his inferiors (on several occasions, crews refused to let him on board to use their ship as flagship), shunned by his equals and always full of insubordination against his superiors". De With was also seen as courageous, competent and an excellent sailor. He was embittered by the neglect of the fleet between 1639 and 1650.

== Pamphleteer ==
One of the more remarkable aspects of De With's personality was his being a notorious pamphleteer, publishing many booklets, anonymously or under the name of friends, in which he sometimes praised but more often ridiculed or even insulted his fellow officers. Tromp was a favourite subject for all three categories.

== Sources ==
- Warnsinck, J.C.M., 1938, Drie zeventiende-eeuwsche admiraals : Piet Heyn, Witte de With, Jan Evertsen
- Doedens, A., 2008, Witte de With 1599-1658 — Wereldwijde strijd op zee in de Gouden eeuw, Hilversum, Verloren, ISBN 9789087040604
