= Action of 18 June 1629 =

1629 battle of the Eighty Years' War

- Part of the Eighty Years' War
- Dutch warships before Dunkirk, circa 1630
Date	18 June 1629
Location	English Channel
Result	Dutch victory

Belligerents
Dutch Republic	Spain

Commanders and leaders
(Dutch Republic) Piet Hein †; (Dutch Republic) Maarten Tromp	(Spain) Mathieu Rombaut

Strength
7 warships	3 warships

Casualties and losses
unknown	1 warship captured

The Action of 18 June 1629 was a naval engagement between a Dutch squadron under Piet Hein and three privateers from Ostend during the Eighty Years' War. The engagement resulted in the death of Hein and the capture of at least one privateer vessel.

== Background ==
In March 1629, Piet Hein was appointed lieutenant-admiral of Holland and West Friesland, following his celebrated capture of the Spanish treasure fleet in 1628. His new responsibilities included protecting Dutch merchant shipping against privateers operating from the Spanish Netherlands. His flagship was the Groene Draeck, aboard which Maarten Tromp served as flag captain.

On 30 May, Tromp departed the Goeree estuary with seven ships to escort merchantmen in the North Sea and off the Flemish coast. During the voyage, Hein received reports of privateer activity near Ostend and subsequently pursued enemy vessels along the southern coast of England.

== Battle ==
On 18 June, Hein encountered three privateers from Ostend, commanded by Mathieu Rombaut, Jacques Besage and Henri Osten. Although frequently referred to as Dunkirk privateers, the three ships were operating from Ostend. Rombaut held overall command of the small force.

Hein sailed ahead of the rest of his squadron aboard his flagship, the Groene Draeck, and engaged the three privateers before the other Dutch warships could come to his assistance. During the fighting, Hein was struck in the shoulder by a cannonball and killed. Maarten Tromp, his flag captain, continued the engagement, while the remaining Dutch ships arrived to support the flagship.

Jacques Besage, commanding the frigate Anna, was also killed during the engagement, but his second-in-command managed to escape to Ostend with the damaged vessel. The Dutch captured at least one of the remaining privateers, probably the ship commanded by Osten, while Rombaut appears to have escaped. Tromp subsequently received a gold medal for capturing an enemy privateer.

== Aftermath ==
Hein's body was taken to Hellevoetsluis and subsequently transported to Delft, where he was buried at public expense in the Oude Kerk on 4 July 1629. His death was widely mourned in the Dutch Republic. Besage was buried in Ostend, where an epitaph commemorated his death during the engagement.

Tromp's conduct during the engagement earned him considerable recognition. In July, the States of Holland awarded him a gold chain in recognition of his service. Following Hein's death, Tromp continued his operations against the Dunkirk privateers, capturing several of their vessels. However, he subsequently became involved in a dispute with Vice-Admiral Liefhebber over command of the Groene Draeck. Although the States General supported Tromp's position, the admiralty eventually appointed another captain to the ship. Disappointed by this decision, Tromp temporarily left naval service and returned to the merchant marine.

== Sources ==
- Dreesen, J. B. (1985). "Jaak Besage versus Piet Heyn" (PDF). De Plate. 85: 37–39.
- Prud'homme van Reine, Ronald (2009). Schittering en schandaal: Biografie van Maerten en Cornelis Tromp. De Arbeiderspers.
