= Fight in the Channel =

1639 battle of the Eighty Years' War

- Part of the Eighty Years' War
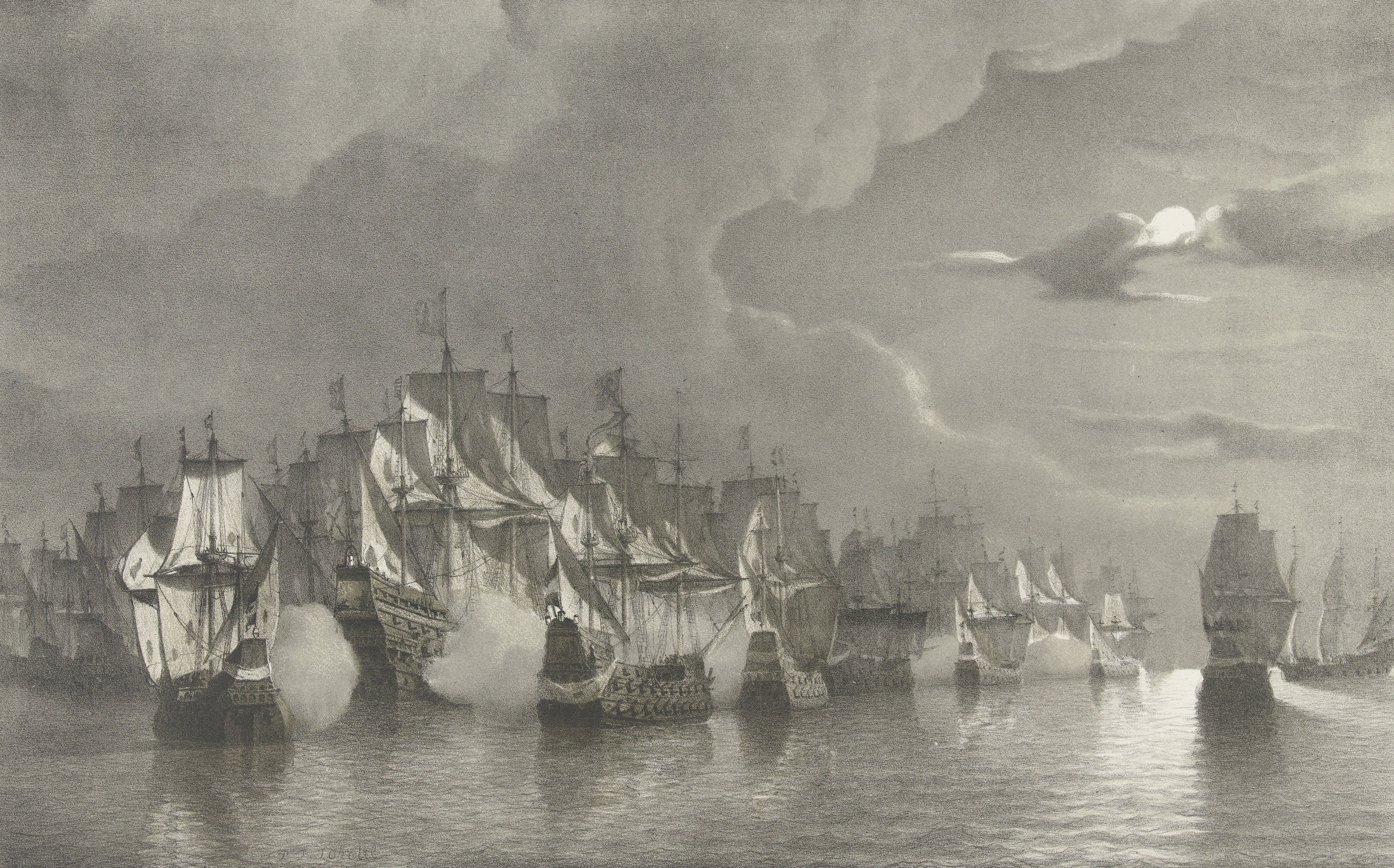
- 19th-century Dutch illustration of the battle
Date	1639
Location	Off Calais, English Channel
Result	Inconclusive

Belligerents
Dutch Republic	Spain

Commanders and leaders
(Dutch Republic) Maarten Tromp	(Spain) Antonio de Oquendo

Strength
Day 1; 17 ships 500 guns Day 2; 29 ships	67 ships 2,500 guns

Casualties and losses
1 ship exploded	1 ship captured and severe damage to the Galleons

The Fight in the Channel took place on 16 and 17 September 1639 when a Dutch squadron under Admiral Maarten Tromp and Admiral Witte Corneliszoon de With, met with a much larger but poorly led Spanish fleet under Antonio D'Oquendo, consisting of 40 to 45 men–of–war and 40 to 50 transport vessels filled with some 13,000 Spanish soldiers who were being transported to Dunkirk. Tromp with 12 ships spotted the Spanish fleet on the 16th, but waited for de With to arrive with five more ships before attacking. Despite his numerical inferiority Tromp got the upper hand in a running fight which lasted into the night. The next day, Zeeland Commodore Joost Banckert arrived to reinforce the Dutch with 12 more ships. Fighting continued until the Dutch ran out of gunpowder when D'Oquendo retreated to the roadstead of the Downs hoping for English protection which would eventually lead to the Battle of the Downs, where D'Oquendo was decisively defeated.
