= Maarten Tromp =

Dutch admiral (1598–1653)

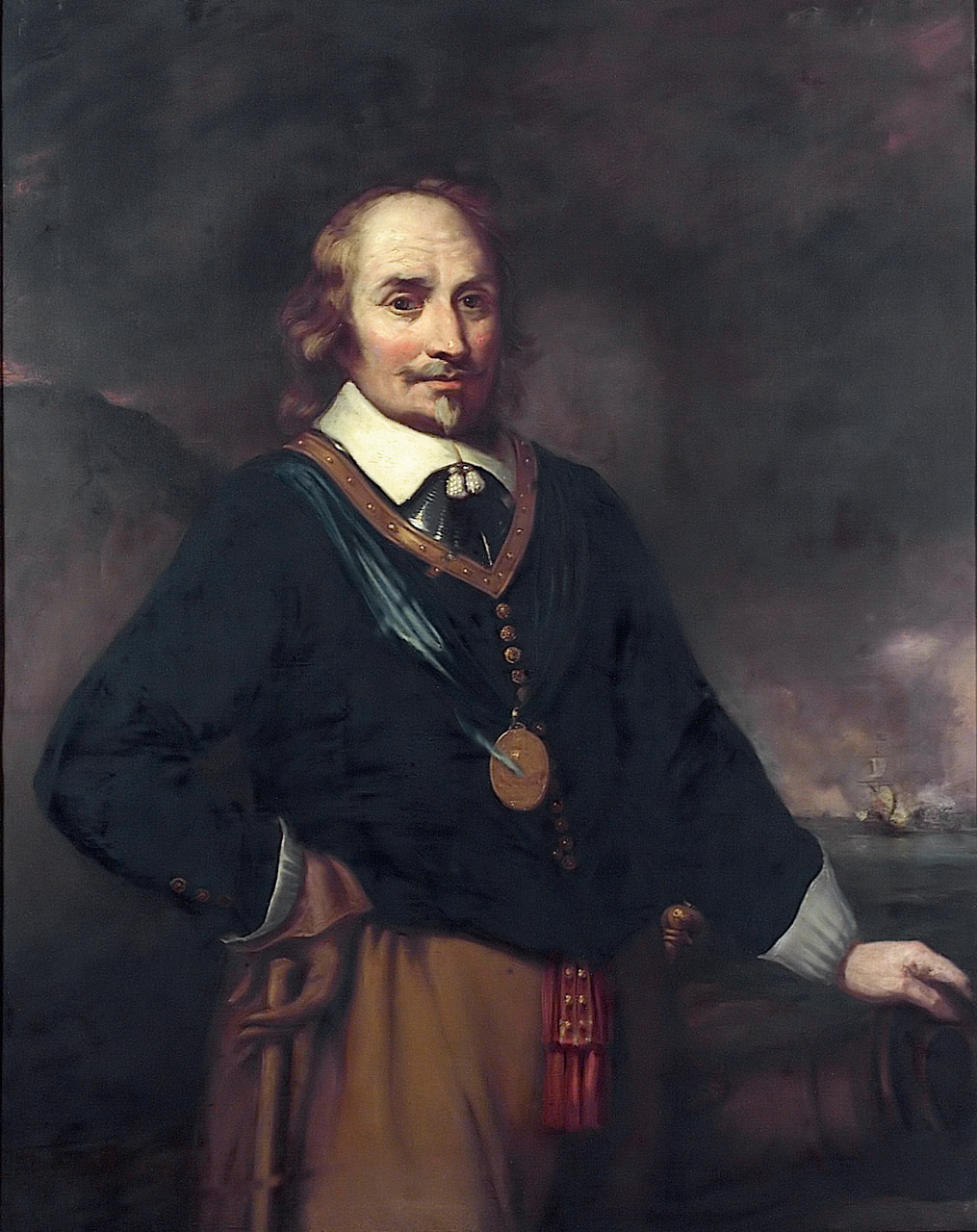
- A portrait of Tromp after Jan Lievens.
- Born: Maarten Harpertszoon Tromp; 23 April 1598; Brielle, Dutch Republic
- Died: 31 July 1653 (aged 55); Brederode, off Scheveningen, Dutch Republic
- Burial place: Oude Kerk, Delft
- Military career
- Allegiance: Dutch Republic
- Service years: 1607–1653
- Nickname: Bestevaêr
- Conflicts: Eighty Years' War; Battle of Gibraltar; Action of 18 June 1629; Action of 18 February 1639; Fight in the Channel; Battle of the Downs; Siege of Dunkirk; Siege of Mardyck; First Anglo-Dutch War; Battle of Dover; Battle of Dungeness; Battle of Portland; Battle of the Gabbard; Battle of Scheveningen †; Coat of arms

Maarten Harpertszoon Tromp (23 April 1598 – 31 July 1653), also known as Maarten van Tromp, was an army general and admiral in the Dutch navy during much of the Eighty Years' War and throughout the First Anglo-Dutch War.

Born in Brielle, the son of a ship's captain, Tromp spent much of his childhood at sea, during which time he was twice captured by pirates and sold into slavery. After regaining his freedom, he joined the Dutch navy and served with distinction, rising to the rank of lieutenant admiral in 1637 during the Eighty Years' War. Subsequently at the behest of Stadtholder Frederick Henry, Prince of Orange he accepted the command of the Dutch navy, which had fallen into a deplorable state due to incompetence and neglect. In 1639, through the deliberate use of line of battle tactics, he won a decisive victory over Antonio de Oquendo's Spanish fleet at the Battle of the Downs. The defeat all but marked the end of Spain's power at sea and ushered in an era of Dutch maritime supremacy.

A skirmish between Tromp and English Admiral Robert Blake at Dover in 1652 led to the outbreak of the First Anglo-Dutch War. Temporary control of the English Channel following the Dutch victory at Dungeness was soon lost when Tromp suffered a significant defeat at the Gabbard in the face of superior English firepower. During the final battle of the war at Scheveningen in July 1653, Tromp was fatally wounded by an English sharpshooter. His death, a major blow to both the Dutch navy and the Orangist faction, solidified his public status as a naval hero. He was accorded a state funeral and interred in the Oude Kerk in Delft.

Tromp was a Dutch naval commander active during the expansion of the Dutch Republic. He was recognized for his tactical developments and achieved significant public renown during his career.

== Early life ==
Born in Brielle in the Netherlands, Tromp was the oldest son of Harpert Maertensz, a naval officer and captain of the frigate Olifantstromp ("Elephant Trunk"). The surname Tromp probably derives from the name of the ship; it first appeared in documents in 1607. He was baptized 3 May 1598 in St. Catherine's Cathedral. In 1606, the Tromp family moved to Rotterdam where Tromp's father was appointed by the Admiralty of Rotterdam as captain of the frigate Olifantstromp. His mother supplemented the family's income as a washerwoman. In 1607, at the age of nine, Tromp went to sea with his father aboard the Olifantsdorp, of the Rotterdam squadron, commanded by Commodore Mooy Lambert, as part of the Dutch fleet of Lieutenant-Admiral Jacob van Heemskerck, with the objective of blockading Dunkirk and the Spanish coast and intercepting the Spanish fleet being sent to drive the Dutch from the East Indies. On 25 April, a fierce battle ensued at the Battle of Gibraltar, resulting in a great Dutch victory.

In 1610, after his father's discharge because of a navy reorganization, the Tromps were on their way to Guinea on their merchantman when they were attacked by a squadron of seven ships under command of the English pirate Peter Easton. During the fight, Tromp's father was slain by a cannonball, where after the battle his body was thrown overboard by the boarding party. According to legend, the 12-year-old boy rallied the crew of the ship with the cry "Won't you avenge my father's death?" The pirates seized him and sold him on the slave market of Salé where he ended up serving as a cabin boy. Two years later, Easton was moved by pity and ordered his redemption.

Set free, Tromp supported his mother and three sisters by working in a Rotterdam shipyard. He went to sea again at 19, briefly working for the navy, but he was captured again in 1621 after having rejoined the merchant fleet, this time by Barbary corsairs off Tunis. He was kept as a slave until the age of 24 and by then had so impressed the Bey of Tunis and the corsair John Ward with his skills in gunnery and navigation that the latter offered him a position in his fleet. When Tromp refused, the Bey was even more impressed by this show of character and allowed him to leave as a free man in 1622.

== Naval career ==
Maarten Tromp was supreme commander of the Dutch fleet during the later part of the Eighty Years' War and throughout the First Anglo-Dutch War. He is widely considered the best Dutch naval commander during most of this time. Tromp's former superior, Admiral Piet Pieterszoon Hein, once told a friend that Tromp as a seaman and a commander possessed a sound character that distinguished him from all the captains he had ever known. Tromp joined the Dutch navy as a lieutenant in July 1622, entering service with the Admiralty of the Maze based in Rotterdam, serving aboard the Bruynvisch. On 7 May 1624, he married Dignom Cornelisdochter de Haes, the daughter of a merchant; in the same year he became captain of the St. Antonius, a fast sailing dispatch and escort yacht. His first distinction was as Lieutenant-Admiral Hein's flag captain on the Vliegende Groene Draeck during the fight with Ostend privateers in 1629 in which Hein was killed, after which Tromp returned home with his body.

=== Eighty Years' War ===
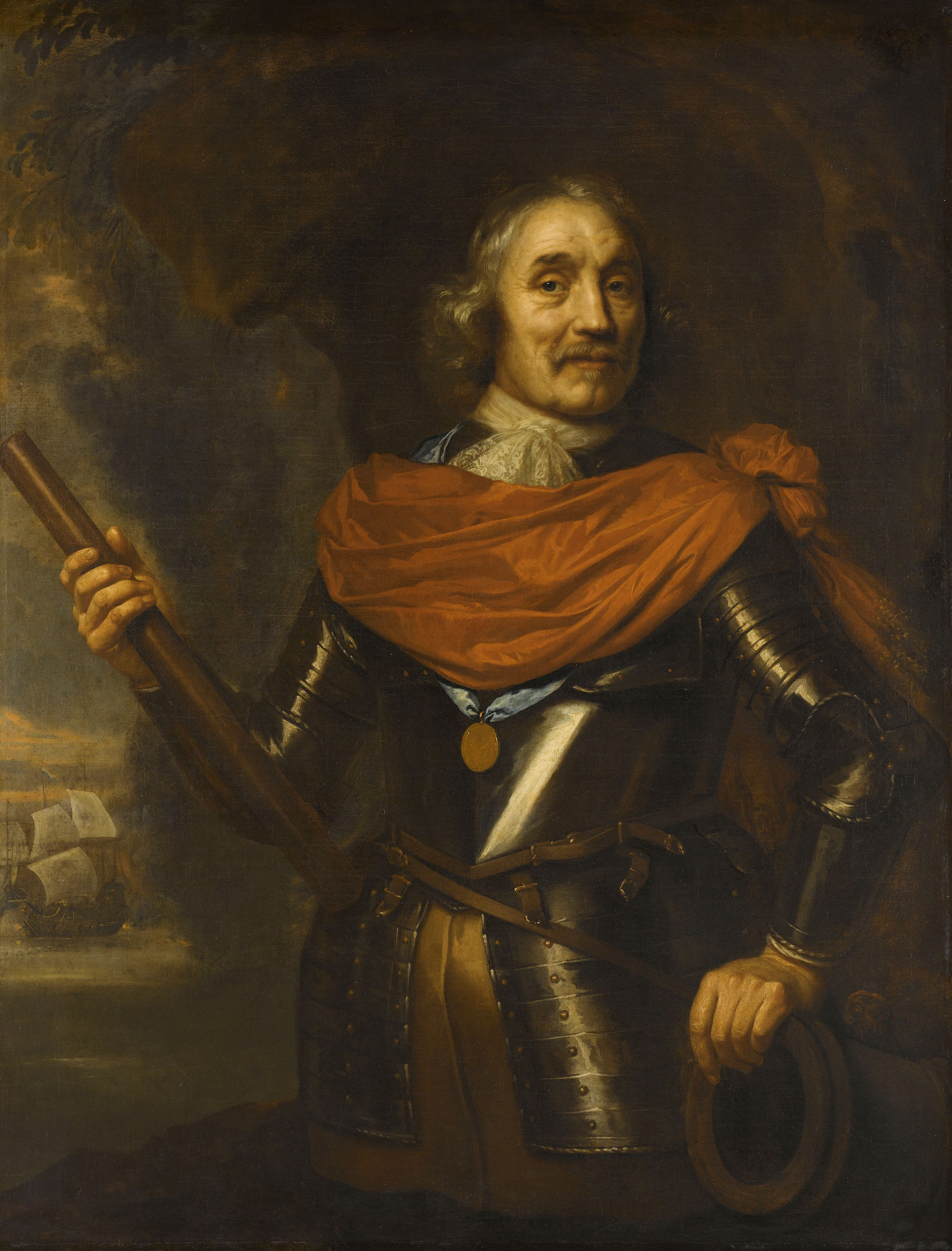
Maarten van Tromp by Jan Lievens

During the Eighty Years' War (1568–1648), Tromp was appointed as full captain in 1629 at the initiative of stadtholder Frederick Henry himself, where Tromp demonstrated that he was very successful in fighting the Dunkirkers as a squadron commander, functioning as a commandeur on the Vliegende Groene Draeck. Despite receiving four honorary golden chains, he was not promoted further. The Vliegende Groene Draeck foundered and new heavy vessels were reserved for the flag officers while Tromp was relegated to the old Prins Hendrik. After Tromp's first wife died in 1634, with whom he had three sons left for Tromp to support, he subsequently left the naval service that year in disappointment. He became a deacon and married Alijth Jacobsdochter Arckenboudt, the daughter of Brill's wealthy schepen and tax collector, on 12 September 1634.

In 1637 Tromp re-enlisted in the Dutch navy and was promoted from captain to Lieutenant-Admiral of Holland and West Frisia, under the Stadtholder, Frederick Henry, Prince of Orange. This occurred following the resignation of Lieutenant-Admiral Philips van Dorp, and the dismissal of Vice-Admiral Jasper Liefhebber, and other flag officers due to incompetence, neglecting the Dutch navy which had fallen into a deplorable state, with several captains resigning their commissions and seeking service with the army. With the resignation of van Dorp on 27 October the States of Holland once again asked Tromp to accept the command of the Dutch navy. Tromp accepted but under the conditions that afforded him greater authority than was allowed for the navy’s previous commanders, remembering how badly the fleet had been neglected by them under van Dorp. Tromp insisted on a greater number of ships, which were to be well outfitted with supplies, and well manned. The States gave Tromp their solemn promise that they would grant all his requests. The terms of Tromp’s official appointment from the Stadtholder further strengthened his position. Witte de With, a year younger, very brave but brutal and ill-tempered, was appointed as his vice-admiral. Both were born in Den Briel and served as flag captains under Piet Hein. Although formally ranking under the Admiral-General Frederick Henry of Orange, he was the de facto supreme commander of the Dutch fleet, as the stadtholders never fought at sea. Tromp was mostly occupied with blockading the privateer port of Dunkirk.

With his flagship, the Aemilia, Tromp promptly re-established the neglected blockade of Dunkirk and took steps to hinder the transportation of Spanish troops to Flanders. Tromp out-maneuvered Oquendo's fleet which was bound for Flanders but was forced to retreat to England at the Downs, behind the sandbanks of the Kentish coast, where they remained trapped, while a prolonged debate preceding the Wars of the Three Kingdoms continued in London. Tromp was already familiar with the channel from his cruising during 1637 and 1638, and sailed to Calais Roads, blocking the southwestern entrance of Dunkirk, where he resupplied his fleet from Calais with the support of Cardinal Richelieu. Now with a reinforced fleet Tromp, in spite of the objection of Charles I, who was on good terms with the Spain,. (Note: Tromp had received secret instructions from the Stadholder, Frederick Henry, Prince of Orange, to disregard English objections.) attacked on 21 October, during the Battle of the Downs, destroying a large proportion of Oquendo's armada. During the Fight in the Channel, a preliminary action to the Downs, Tromp was the first fleet commander known for the deliberate use of line of battle tactics, marking the end of Spanish naval power. For his landmark victory Tromp was rewarded by the States-General and knighted by Louis XIII of France, a close Dutch ally in the war against Spain. Shortly thereafter his second wife died. Tromp married again in 1640, to Cornelia van Berckhout. In 1643 the deputy of parliament in Holland made a loud protest in the General Assembly against the Prince of Orange for his orders to Tromp to allow two of the frigates bought by English royalists in Dunkirk, to be released for their use and command.

During his career, his main rival was Vice-Admiral Witte de With, who also served the Admiralty of Rotterdam (de Maze) from 1637. De With temporarily replaced him as supreme commander for the Battle of Kentish Knock. Tromp's crew would not permit De With, who had a reputation of severity when disciplining a crew, to raise his flag on their ship, and insisted that he use the Prins Willem (Note: Dutch for "Prince William") as his flagship. Tromp's successor was Lieutenant-Admiral Jacob van Wassenaer Obdam.

Tromp commanded the Dutch squadron that escorted Queen Henrietta Maria in 1643 when she returned from The Hague to King Charles I. Opposed to her returning to England the Parliamentarian squadron under William Batten threatened to attack the Queen's convoy when it landed at Bridlington but was thwarted by Tromp to withdraw.

=== First Anglo-Dutch War ===
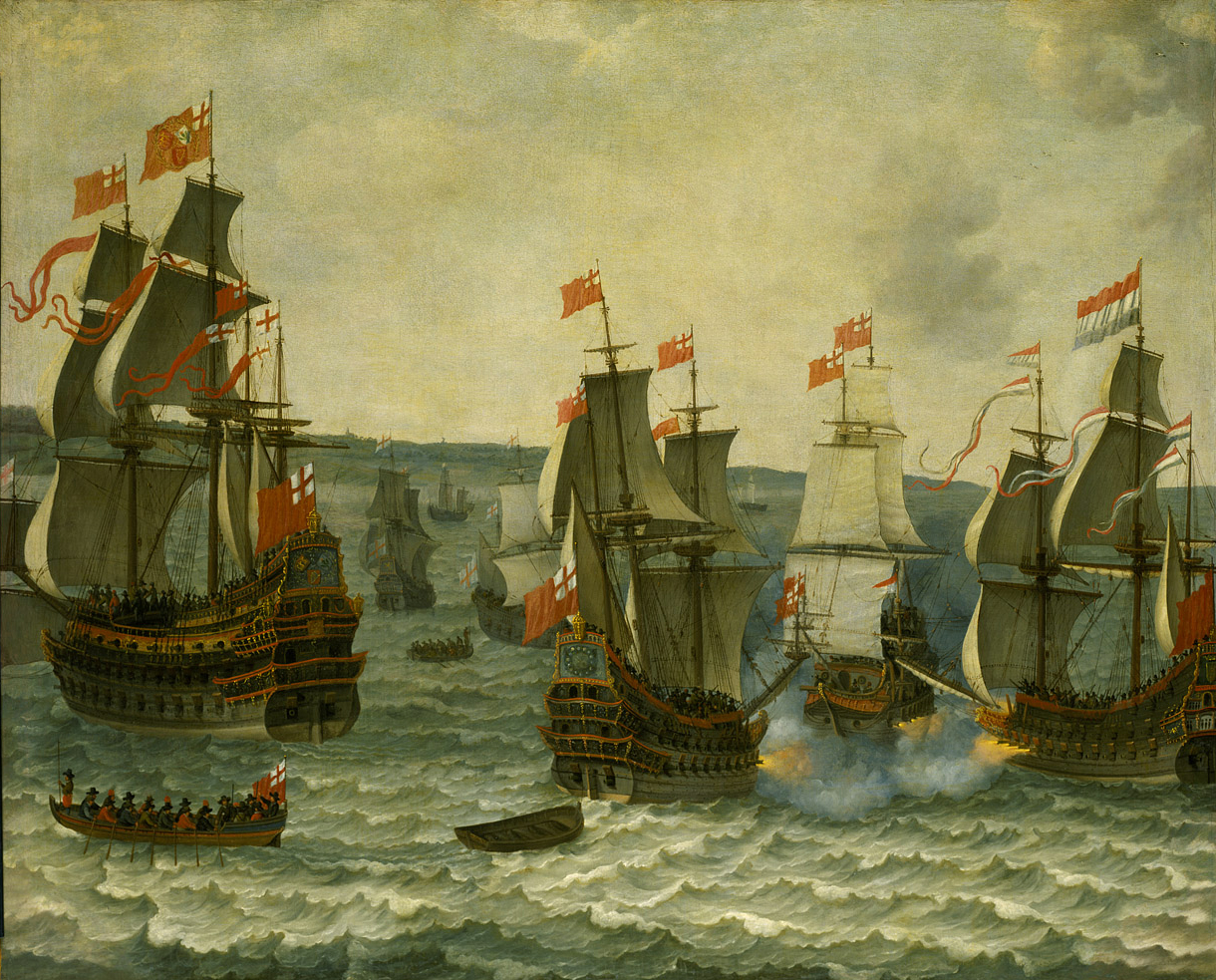
Ships in the First Anglo-Dutch War, 1652, by Abraham Willaerts

In the First Anglo-Dutch War of 1652 to 1653, Tromp commanded the Dutch fleet in the battles of Dover, Dungeness, Portland, the Gabbard and Scheveningen.

Prior to the war, Oliver Cromwell and the Rump Parliament had issued an ordinance prohibiting foreign trade and requiring all foreign fleets in the North Sea or the Channel to lower their flag in salute and as a sign of compliance. A Dutch embassy was in London trying to negotiate a lifting of the Navigation Acts, but without much success. On 19 May 1652, Tromp was cruising in the English Channel with a fleet of forty ships between Nieuport and the mouth of the Meuse River, with general orders to protect Holland's commerce, while keeping watch over the English navy, which was searching and seizing Dutch merchant ships prior. English Admiral Robert Blake had recently seized seven richly laden Dutch merchant ships, off the coast of Fairlight. Blake was now lying in Dover Roads with fifteen ships, while eight others were anchored in Bourne in the Downs. When Tromp failed to lower his flag in salute, Blake, aboard his flagship James, believing Tromp had just received orders from a dispatch ketch to commence battle, fired two warning shots with no cannonballs. The Battle of Dover was begun when Tromp refused to strike his flag and instead hoisted a red battle flag in defiance, which prompted James to fire a third shot, hitting Tromp's ship and wounding some crew members. This was followed with Tromp returning fire with a warning broadside from his flagship Brederode. James in turn fired a broadside and a five-hour battle ensued. The fighting continued until nightfall, where both sides withdrew, the battle having no distinct victor. Shortly after the battle a board of commissioners, which included Cromwell, after questioning witnesses, had concluded that Tromp had deliberately provoked hostilities. Subsequently the Dutch Republic withdrew its three ambassadors from Westminster, and on 8 July 1652 England declared war against the Dutch.

Tromp, with a larger fleet than he had ordered for, sailed to the Downs and found that Blake had made it to the north-east coast, where he set sail for the Thames River. Near the mouth of the river he came upon an English squadron commanded by Sir George Ayscue, which had the advantage of the weather gage, thus preventing Tromp from engaging effectively. Subsequently, Tromp decided to return to the Dutch coast, which was a decision that was not at all well received by the Dutch government, resulting in his removal from command, with Vice-admiral Witte de With taking his place.

On 8 October 1652, with Tromp's command still in suspension, De With underestimating Blake, with 60 ships, attempted an attack at the Battle of the Kentish Knock, but ended with Blake sending the defeated De With back to Holland. Although De With was the more adept tactician, he was no match against Blake's force that included the heavy English ships Resolution and Sovereign, the two largest warships in the world at the time. (Note: The Resolution had 70 guns, and the Sovereign had 102 guns. See: • Sovereign and • English ship Prince Royal (1610) The significance of De With's defeat was received over-optimistically by the Council of State, leading them to assume that Blake now had control over the English Channel. The Council subsequently dispersed their fleets to protect English interests in the Baltic Sea and North Sea, while another fleet was sent to reinforce the English squadron in the Mediterranean. This left Blake with about forty ships that were in anchor in the Downs, and a situation that was compounded by a lack of funds to pay for badly needed repairs and for the crews.

Subsequent to De With's defeat, Tromp was reinstated as commander, on 8 May, which proved to be a big boost for Dutch naval morale, which was the highest it had been since he was dismissed months before in July. The Battle of Dungeness occurred on 30 November 1652, and proved to be the most important Dutch victory during the war, with Tromp's fleet winning for the Dutch the temporary control of the English Channel. A great convoy of 300 merchant ships was ready to leave the Netherlands headed for the Bay of Biscay, accompanied by a large fleet of 73 warships and a small number of fireships which were sent in escort to protect it. Tromp was in command, with Jan Evertsen and De Ruyter as his subordinate commanders. Admiral Blake had seriously underestimated Dutch strength, possibly due to poor visibility, as his fleet was outnumbered, two-to-one. Blake sailed parallel to the Dutch fleet along the English coast towards Dungeness, with the coastline beginning to bend to the south. As the fleets were approaching Dungeness Point Blake's fleet became pinned against the shore bringing the two fleets close together. Tromp subsequently hoisted the red battle-flag and advanced on Blake’s new flagship, the Triumph. The battle that developed involved only a part of the Dutch fleet as the winds were preventing the others from engaging in a timely fashion. There was much hand-to-hand fighting that lasted until about 5:00 pm with the advance of nightfall, with the Dutch fleet prevailing, capturing several English ships, while Blake retreated to the mouth of the Thames. Tromp's victory prompted the English navy to issue several major reforms. (Note: British naval historian Andrew Lambert maintains that the Dutch victory was a "salutary reminder" that the English were dealing with a major and capable opponent, causing Blake to submit his resignation, which was declined, and prompting a Court of Enquiry to further look into matters, while the Council of State supported Blake's contention that he had to have absolute authority in such matters, with added subordinate commanders, and an increase in sailor's pay, while insisting for the same professional standards that existed for the army. This was followed with a large tax increase to fund these improvements.) According to contemporary English sources, after his victory at Dungeness, Tromp attached a broom to his mast as a symbol that he had swept the English from the sea.

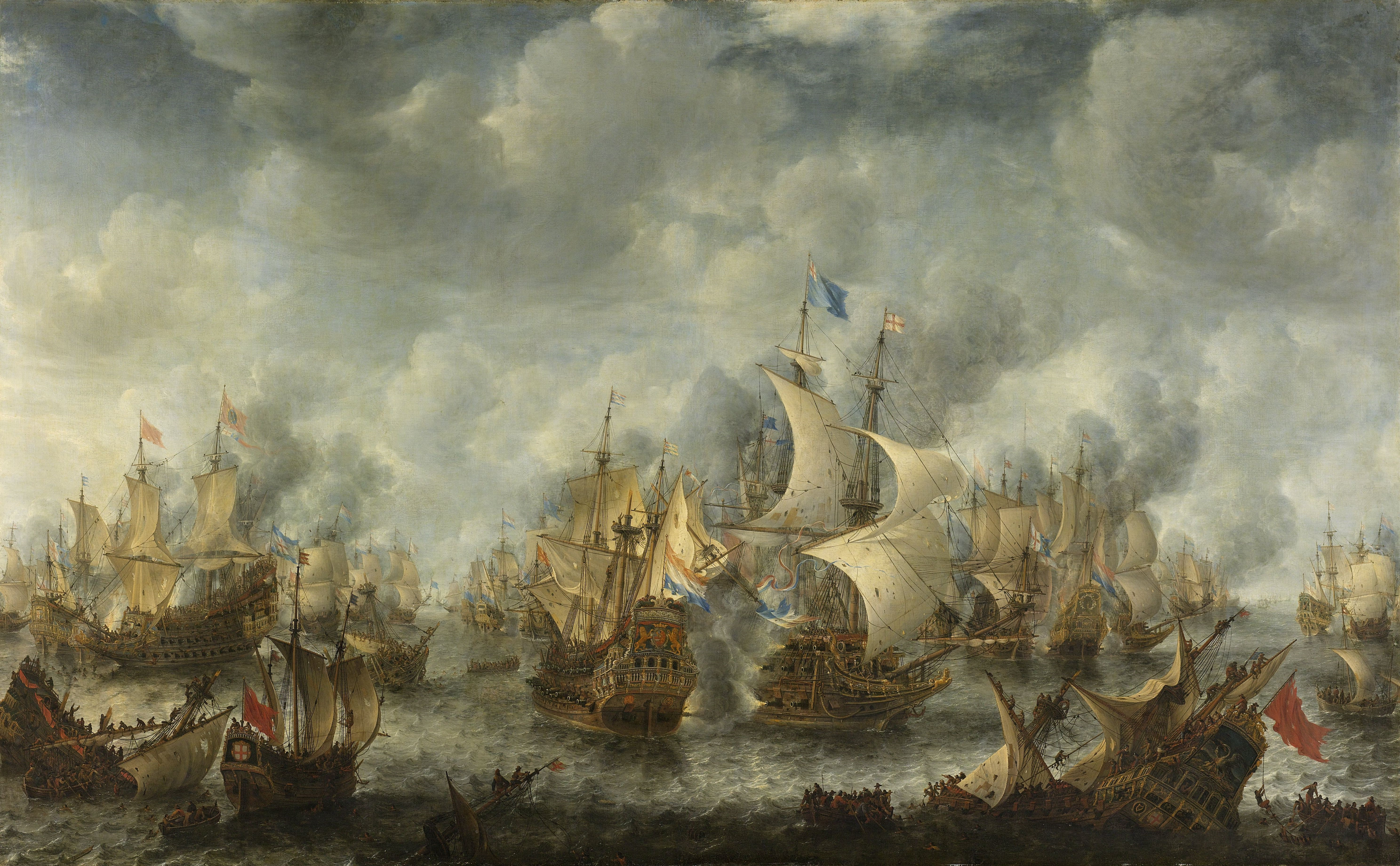
Battle of Scheveningen, Tromp's final battle

The naval Battle of the Gabbard, took place on 2–3 June 1653, (12–13 June 1653 Gregorian calendar) off the coast of Suffolk, England near the Gabbard shoal. Tromp, aboard his flagship Brederode with de With aboard Vrijheid, was in command of 98 ships and six fireships, divided in five squadrons, while Generals at Sea George Monck and Richard Deane were in command of 100 ships and five fireships, divided into three squadrons. Tromp's fleet was organized mostly for boarding actions and were largely crewed with soldiers for that purpose, while the English employed the use of superior firepower. Blake joined the English fleet on 3 June. Though his fleet was very low on ammunition Tromp decided for a direct attack, but at the time the winds became almost still, leaving the Dutch fleet vulnerable in the face of superior English fire. Subsequently the Dutch lost seventeen ships captured or sunk, while the English lost none. Deane was killed during the action. It was one of the worst defeats ever suffered by the Dutch navy, leaving the English in control of the English Channel.

During the Battle of Scheveningen, the last battle of the war, on 31 July 1653, Tromp was killed by an English sharpshooter in the rigging of William Penn's ship. Tromp's flagship, the Brederode, broke through the English line where an intense battle ensued, resulting in Tromp's imminent death. Tromp's last words were, "It is all over, O Lord, be merciful to me and thy poor people." Members of his crew carried the mortally wounded Tromp below deck to his cabin, where he died. His acting flag captain, Egbert Bartholomeusz Kortenaer, on the Brederode kept up fleet morale by not lowering Tromp's standard, pretending Tromp was still alive. At this point Evertsen assumed command, and with this the Dutch admirals returned to their ships and resumed battle with "unabated vigour". The loss of Tromp was a severe blow to the Dutch navy. The battle proved to be a tactical victory for the English, but a strategic victory for the Dutch in that they had the blockade removed.

== Legacy ==
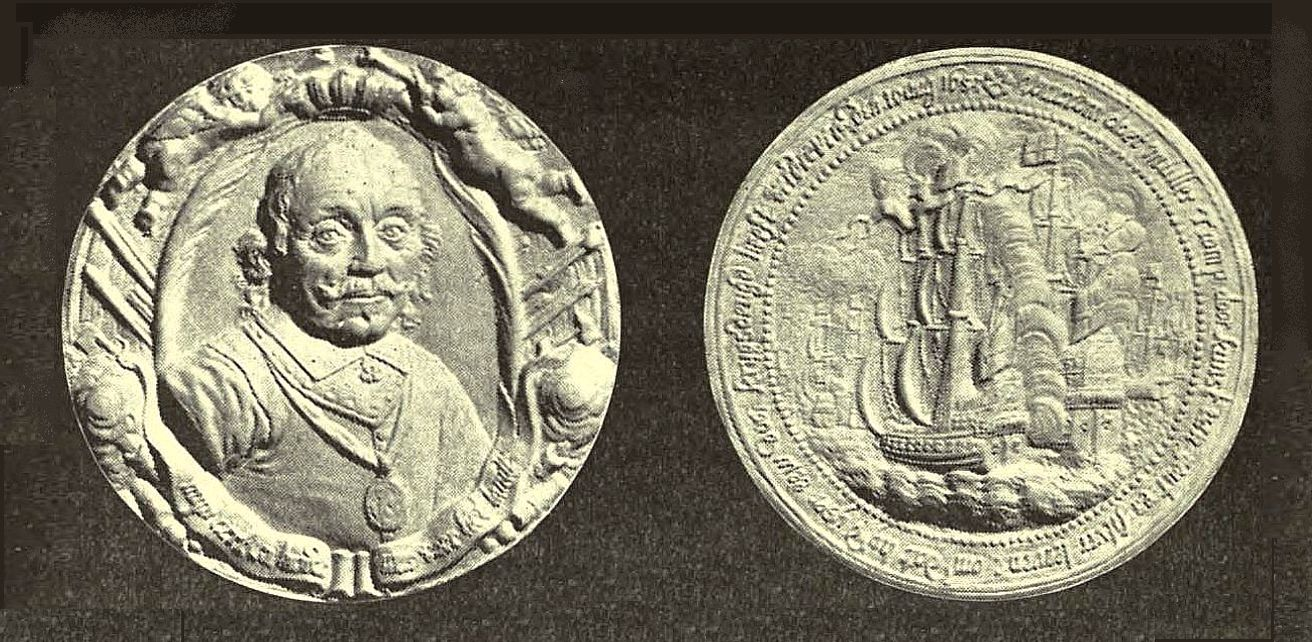
Commemorative medal of Maarten van Tromp, struck 1653 shortly after his death (Diameter: 7.18 cm / 2.82 in)

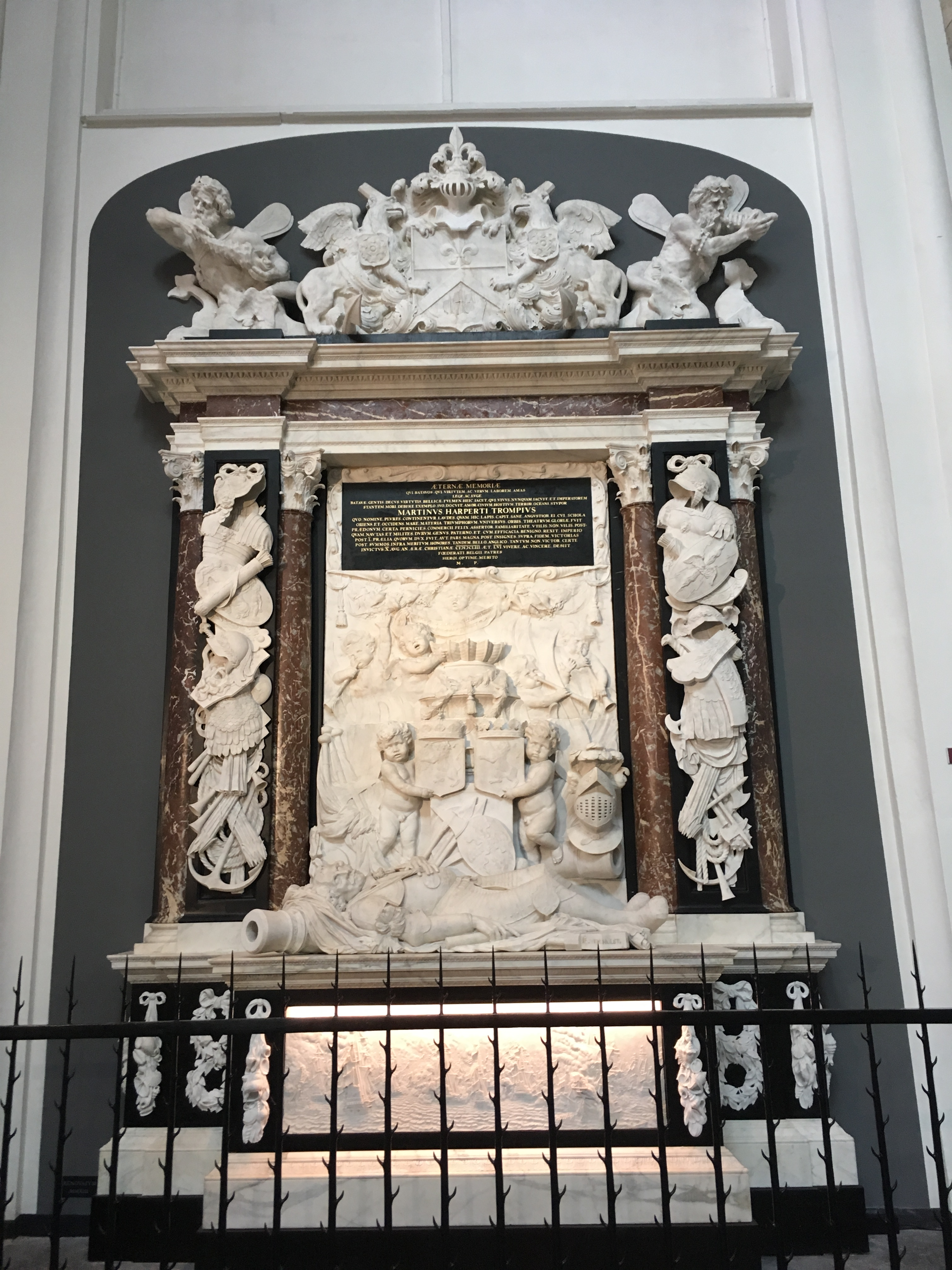
The Delft grave memorial

Tromp was held in high esteem in the Dutch navy and with the general public. His death was a severe blow to the Dutch navy but also to the Orangists, who sought the replacement of the Commonwealth of England with the House of Stuart. Republican influence strengthened after Scheveningen, which led to peace negotiations with the Commonwealth, culminating in the Treaty of Westminster. He received a state funeral in August 1653 at the Oude Kerk in Delft where a monument was erected to his honour. Tromp, a "sea hero", was immensely popular with the Dutch public, a sentiment expressed by poet Joost van den Vondel, who wrote a poem describing the marble grave monument to Tromp in Delft showing the admiral at his moment of death with a burning English fleet on the foreground:

Here rests the hero Tromp, the brave protector
of shipping and free sea, serving free land
his memory alive in artful spectre
as if he had just died at his last stand
His knell the cries of death, guns' thunderous call
a burning Brittany too Great for sea alone
He's carved himself an image in the hearts of all
more lasting than grave's splendour and its marble stone

Tromp's second son, Cornelis Maartenszoon Tromp (1629-1691) was also a distinguished naval officer. Cornelis later became Commander of the Dutch navy, in the rank of Lieutenant-Admiral-General, after previously having commanded the Danish navy. Several ships of the Royal Netherlands Navy have carried the name HNLMS Tromp after them.

In the 2015 film Michiel de Ruyter Maarten Tromp is portrayed by Rutger Hauer.

== See also ==
- Second Anglo-Dutch War
- Glossary of nautical terms : (A–L), (M–Z)

== Bibliography ==
- Gardiner, Samuel Rawson; Atkinson, Christopher Thomas (1899). Letters and papers relating to the First Dutch War, 1652-1654. Vol. IV. London: Navy Records Society.
- ——; —— (1899). Letters and papers relating to the First Dutch War, 1652-1654. Vol. V. London: Navy Records Society.
- Baumber, Michael (2004). Oxford dictionary of national biography : Robert Blake. Vol. VI. Oxford University Press. ISBN 978-0-71954-7065.
- Clowes, William Laird, Sir (1897–1903). The Royal Navy, a history from the earliest times to the present. Vol. II. London: S. Low, Marston.
- Dixon, William Hepworth (1852). Robert Blake, admiral and general at sea. London: Chapman and Hall.
- Gardiner, Samuel Rawson (1897). History of the commonwealth and protectorate, 1649-1660. Vol. I. Longmans, Green and Company.
- —— (1897). History of the commonwealth and protectorate, 1649-1660. Vol. II. Longmans, Green and Company.
- Hannay, David (1886). Admiral Blake. New York: D. Appleton and Company.
- Hinds, Allen B., ed. (1864). Calendar of State Papers and manuscripts relating to English affairs existing in the Archives and collections of Venice, and in other libraries of Northern Italy. Vol. XXIV. London: Longman, H.M.S.O. "by Great Britain. Public Record Office"
- —— (ed.). Calendar of State Papers and manuscripts relating to English affairs existing in the Archives and collections of Venice, and in other libraries of Northern Italy. Vol. XXVI . British History Online; London: His Majesty's Stationery Office, 1925 Calendar of State Papers Relating To English Affairs in the Archives of Venice, 1642–1643.
- Hyde, Edward, Earl of Clarendon (1717). The History of the Rebellion and Civil Wars in England: Begun in the Year 1641. Vol. III, pt.ii.
- Israel, Jonathan (1995). The Dutch Republic : its rise, greatness and fall, 1477-1806. Oxford : Clarendon Press. ISBN 978-0-19873-0729.
- Jones, James Rees (1996). The Anglo-Dutch wars of the seventeenth century. London; New York: Longman. ISBN 978-0-58205-6312.
- R. Prud’homme van Reine, Schittering en Schandaal. Dubbelbiografie van Maerten en Cornelis Tromp, Arbeiderspers, 2001
- Lambert, Andrew D. (2008). Admirals : the naval commanders who made Britain great. London: Faber. ISBN 978-0-57123-1560.
- Low, Charles Rathbone (1872). Great Battles of the British Navy. London: George Routledge and Sons.
- Mets, James Andrew (1902). Naval heroes of Holland. New York; London: The Abbey Press.
- Rickard, J. (19 August 2009), Battle of Scheveningen, 31 July 1653
- Plant, David (15 March 2010), The Battle of Scheveningen 1653, BCW Project
- Stradling, Robert (1979). "Catastrophe and Recovery: The Defeat of Spain, 1639-43". History. 64 (211). Wiley: 205–219. doi:10.1111/j.1468-229X.1979.tb02059.x. JSTOR 24411536.
- Vere, Frances (1955). Salt in their blood: the lives of famous Dutch admirals. London: Cassell & Company, LTD.
- Warner, Oliver (1963). Great sea battles. Weidenfeld & Nicolson.
- Warnsinck, JCM, Twaalf doorluchtige zeehelden, PN van Kampen & Zoon NV, 1941
- Wijn, J.J.A. (1997). Sweetman, Jack (ed.). The Great Admirals : Command at Sea, 1587-1945. Naval Institute Press. ISBN 9780-8-70212-291. "Johannes Jacosus Antonius Wijn (Tromp) has served as Historical Adviser to the Jan Blanken Drydock Foundation at Hellevoetsluis, the Netherlands, Deputy Head of the Historical Department of the Netherlands Naval Staff, and Curator of the museum ship Amsterdam. He received his doctorate from the State University of Leiden in 1982."
- Maarten Harpertszoon Tromp, 1598-1653, BCW Project, 15 March 2010
- "Maarten van Tromp, (1598-1653)". The HistoryFiles.com.
- "Maarten Tromp (1598-1653) – Sea hero from the Golden Age". 2023 Historiek v.o.f., Onafhankelijk particulier initiatief. 30 July 2022.
- Maarten Tromp, Dutch admiral. Encyclopedia Britannica. 27 September 2023. "Editors of Encyclopedia Britannica"
