= Dutch ship Brederode (1644) =

Dutch ship

Coordinates: 56.0164°N 12.6094°E

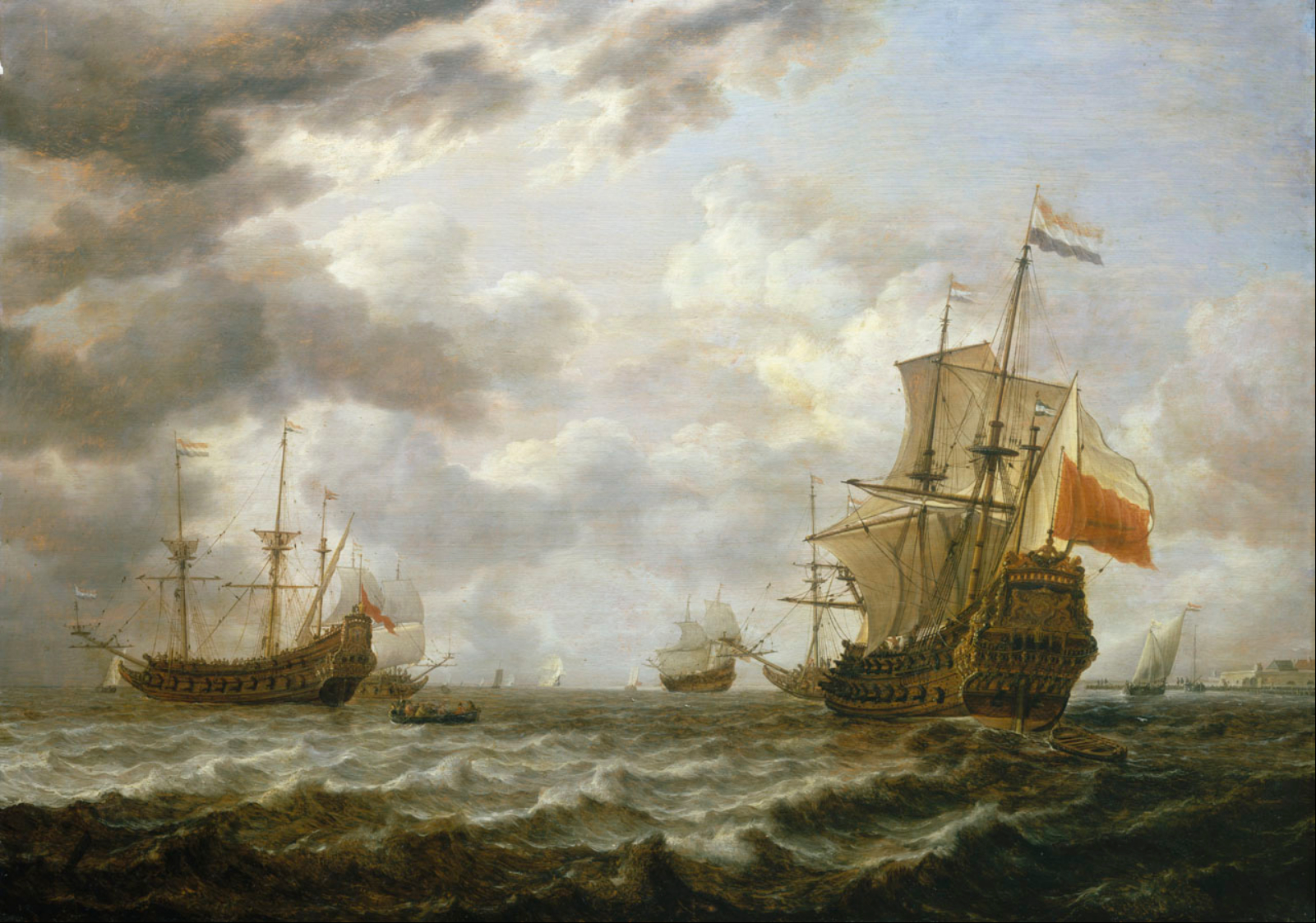
- Brederode off Hellevoetsluis by Simon de Vlieger

History

Dutch Republic
- Name: Brederode
- Builder: Jan Salomonszoon van den Tempel, Rotterdam
- Launched: 1644
- Fate: Sunk by the Swedish ship Wismar in the Battle of the Sound.
- Notes: Participated in: Battle of the Downs

General characteristics
- Class & type: 53-59 gun ship of the line
- Length: 133 ft 8 in (40.74 m)
- Beam: 32 ft 6 in (9.91 m)
- Depth of hold: 13 ft (4.0 m)
- Propulsion: Sails
- Sail plan: Full-rigged ship
- Armament: 49-59 guns: Gundeck: 4 × 36-pounders; 12 × 24-pounders; 8 × 18-pounders; Upper gundeck: 20 × 12-pounders; Quarterdeck, Forecastle & Poop deck: 10-12 × 6-pounders

Brederode was a ship of the line of the Maas Admiralty, part of the navy of the United Provinces of the Netherlands, and the flagship of the Dutch fleet in the First Anglo-Dutch War. Throughout her career, she carried from 49 to 59 guns. She was named after Johan Wolfert van Brederode, the brother-in-law of stadtholder Frederick Henry, Prince of Orange.

== Construction ==
Brederode had a gundeck length of 132 Maas feet, equivalent to 144 Amsterdam feet or 133 ft 8 in (in English Imperial measurements). The maximum breadth was 32 Maas feet (equal to 35 ft 3 in Amsterdam feet, or 32 ft 6 in Imperial), and the depth in hold was 13½ Maas feet (equal to 14 ft 2 inches in Amsterdam feet, or 13 ft Imperial).

Brederode was initially armed with 49 guns, increasing to 54 from 1652. These comprised four 36-pounders, twelve 24-pounders, and eight 18-pounders on the lower deck, twenty 12-pounders on the upper deck, and ten to twelve 6-pounders on the forecastle, quarterdeck, and poop deck. All of her guns were bronze-cast except four of the 12-pounders which were Swedish-made and cast in iron.

Crew numbers varied considerably over Bredereode's sailing career. In September 1652 her complement was 175 sailors, rising to 260 in June 1653 before falling back to 113 in 1656. Between 40 and 75 soldiers were also accommodated aboard.

== Ship history ==
Launched at Rotterdam in 1644, and a design of shipwright Jan Salomonszoon van den Tempel, she was the flagship of Vice-Admiral Witte Corneliszoon de With from May 1645 until 1647 when she was assigned to Lieutenant-Admiral Maarten Tromp. The same year however, she again became De With's flagship for his expedition to Dutch Brazil. De With delegated actual command of the vessel to Lieutenant Jan Janszoon Quack, who remained in that role after the expedition returned to Holland in 1647. Only in 1652 would Tromp sail for the first time with his flag on Brederode, during an attack against royalist privateers operating from the Scilly Islands.

In the First Anglo-Dutch War Brederode was present under Tromp's command at the Battle of Dover on 29 May 1652. After Tromp's failure to bring the English to battle off the Shetland Islands in July, Tromp was relieved and Michiel de Ruyter took over command. When De Ruyter was subordinated to De With in September, Brederode's crew refused to let the latter come on board to take command, so he had to content himself with Prins Willem. Without Tromp, Brederode fought at the Battle of the Kentish Knock on 8 October 1652.

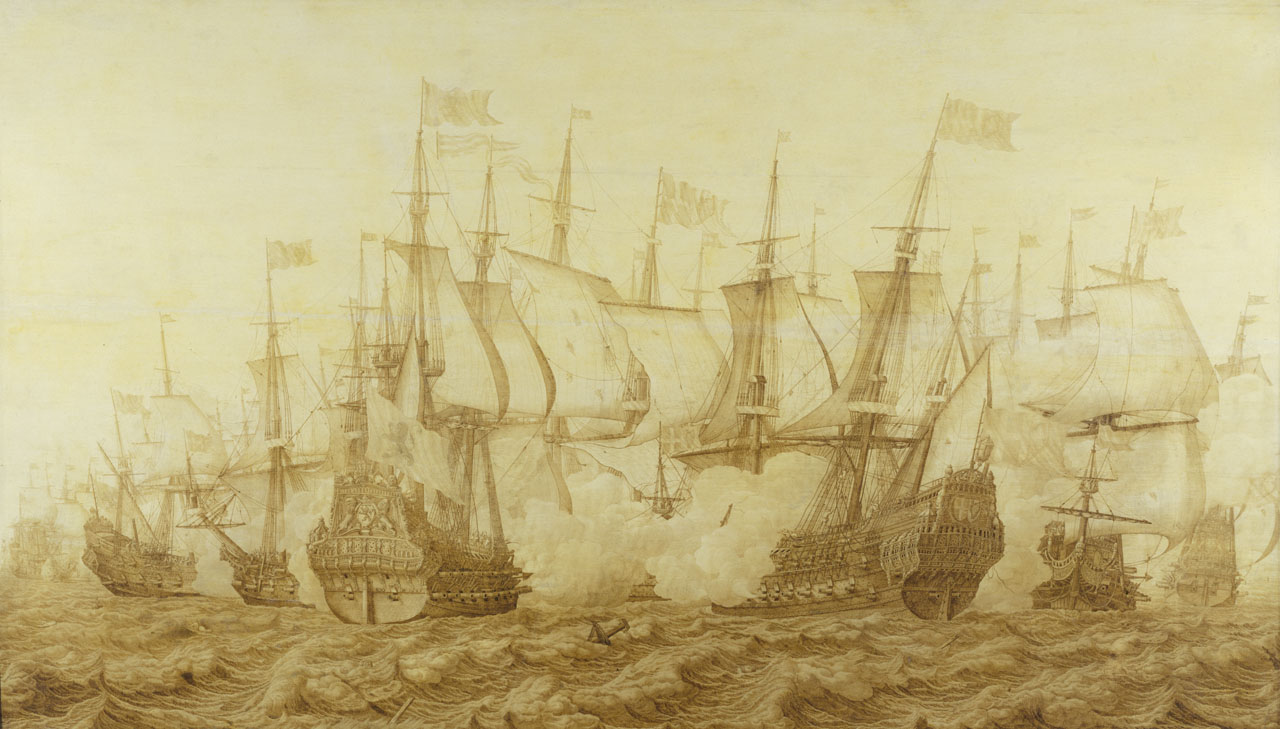
The Battle of the Gabbard, 12 June 1653 by Heerman Witmont, shows the Dutch flagship Brederode (foreground left) in action.

With Tromp back in command, Brederode fought at the Battle of Dungeness on 10 December 1652 where she came close to being captured, but was instrumental in that victory over the English. She fought again on 18 February 1653 at the Battle of Portland and on 12 June 1653 at the Battle of the Gabbard, where she fought an exhausting but inconclusive duel with William Penn's flagship James. On that day, the first day of the battle, Tromp's men boarded the English ship but were beaten back; boarded in turn by the English, Tromp was only able to dislodge the boarders by blowing up Brederode's deck. On 13 June the English were joined by a squadron under Admiral Robert Blake and the Dutch were scattered in defeat.

Death of Maarten Tromp

Brederode fought in the last major engagement of the war, the Battle of Scheveningen on 26 July 1653, when Tromp was killed. The acting flag captain (later Admiral) Egbert Bartholomeusz Kortenaer kept Tromp's standard raised after his death to keep up morale. In the Northern Wars the United Provinces sent an expeditionary force to support Denmark in the war against Charles X of Sweden. In the Battle of the Sound on 8 November 1658 the Dutch fleet, commanded by Lieutenant-Admiral Jacob van Wassenaer Obdam, defeated a Swedish fleet and relieved the siege of Copenhagen. Van Wassenaer's flagship was Eendracht; De With commanded the van in Brederode; attacking the enemy without proper knowledge of the shoals he grounded his ship (after damaging Leoparden so much that this enemy vessel subsequently was lost by fire) and was surrounded; after many hours of fighting, Brederode was boarded by Wismar and De With mortally wounded. The partially burnt wreck was deemed unsalvagable.

== Bibliography ==
- Bender, James (2014). Dutch Warships in the Age of Sail, 1600-1714. Seaforth. ISBN 978-1-84832-157-1.
