= Battle of Scheveningen =

Final naval battle of the First Anglo-Dutch War

- Part of the First Anglo-Dutch War
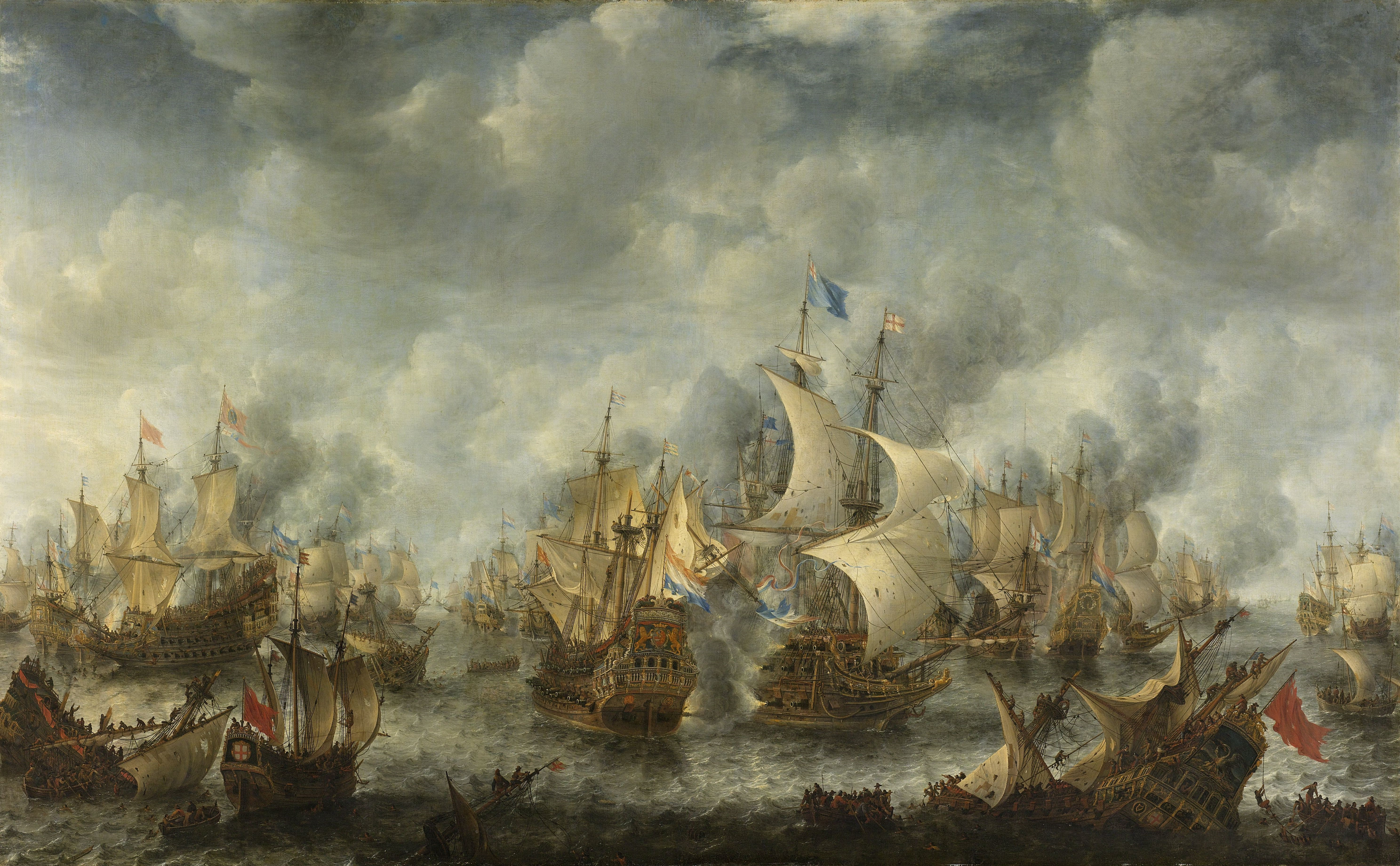
- The Battle of Scheveningen, 10 August 1653; Jan Abrahamsz Beerstraaten
Date	31 July 1653
Location	Off Scheveningen, North Sea 52°06′29″N 4°16′23″E
Result	See aftermath

Belligerents
(Commonwealth of England) English Commonwealth	Dutch Republic

Commanders and leaders
George Monck (Commonwealth of England) Benjamin Blake	Maarten Tromp †

Strength
130 ships 4,000 guns 17,000 men	125 ships 3,450 guns 13,000 men

Casualties and losses
950–1,200 killed and wounded 2 ships lost	2,000 killed and wounded 1,000 captured 12-30 ships lost

The Battle of Scheveningen (Note: also known as the Battle of Ter Heijde) was the final naval battle of the First Anglo-Dutch War. It took place on 31 July 1653 (Note: 10 August per Gregorian calendar; during this period in English history, dates are usually recorded in the Julian calendar, while those the Netherlands are recorded in the Gregorian calendar. In this article dates are in the Julian calendar with the start of the year adjusted to 1 January (see Old Style and New Style dates).) between the fleets of the Commonwealth of England and the Dutch Republic. The Dutch fleet suffered heavy losses.

== Background ==
After their victory at the Battle of the Gabbard in June 1653, the English fleet of 120 ships under General at Sea George Monck on his flagship Resolution blockaded the Dutch coast, capturing many merchant vessels. The Dutch economy began to collapse, with mass unemployment and a severe economic downturn affecting it. On 24 July, Dutch Lieutenant-Admiral Maarten Tromp put to sea in Brederode with a fleet of 100 ships, to lift the blockade at the island of Texel, where Vice-Admiral Witte de With's 27 ships were blockaded by the English. Five days later, the English sighted Tromp and pursued to the south, sinking two Dutch ships before dark but allowing De With to slip out and rendezvous the next day with Tromp off Scheveningen, right next to the small village of Ter Heijde, after Tromp had positioned himself by some brilliant maneuvering to the north of the English fleet.

== Battle ==
The winds were fierce on 30 July and overnight, giving both fleets pause. Around 7:00 a.m. on 31 July, the Dutch gained an advantage from the weather and attacked, led by Brederode. The fleets moved through each other four times. Tromp was killed early in the fight by a sharpshooter in the rigging of Sir William Penn's ship. His death was kept secret to keep up the morale of the Dutch but by late afternoon, twelve of their ships had either been sunk or captured and many were too damaged to continue the fight. In the end, morale broke and a large group of vessels under the command of merchant captains fled to the north. De With tried to halt their flight but had to limit himself to covering the retreat to the island of Texel. The English fleet was also badly damaged and with many wounded in urgent need of treatment, returned to port to refit and were unable to maintain the blockade.

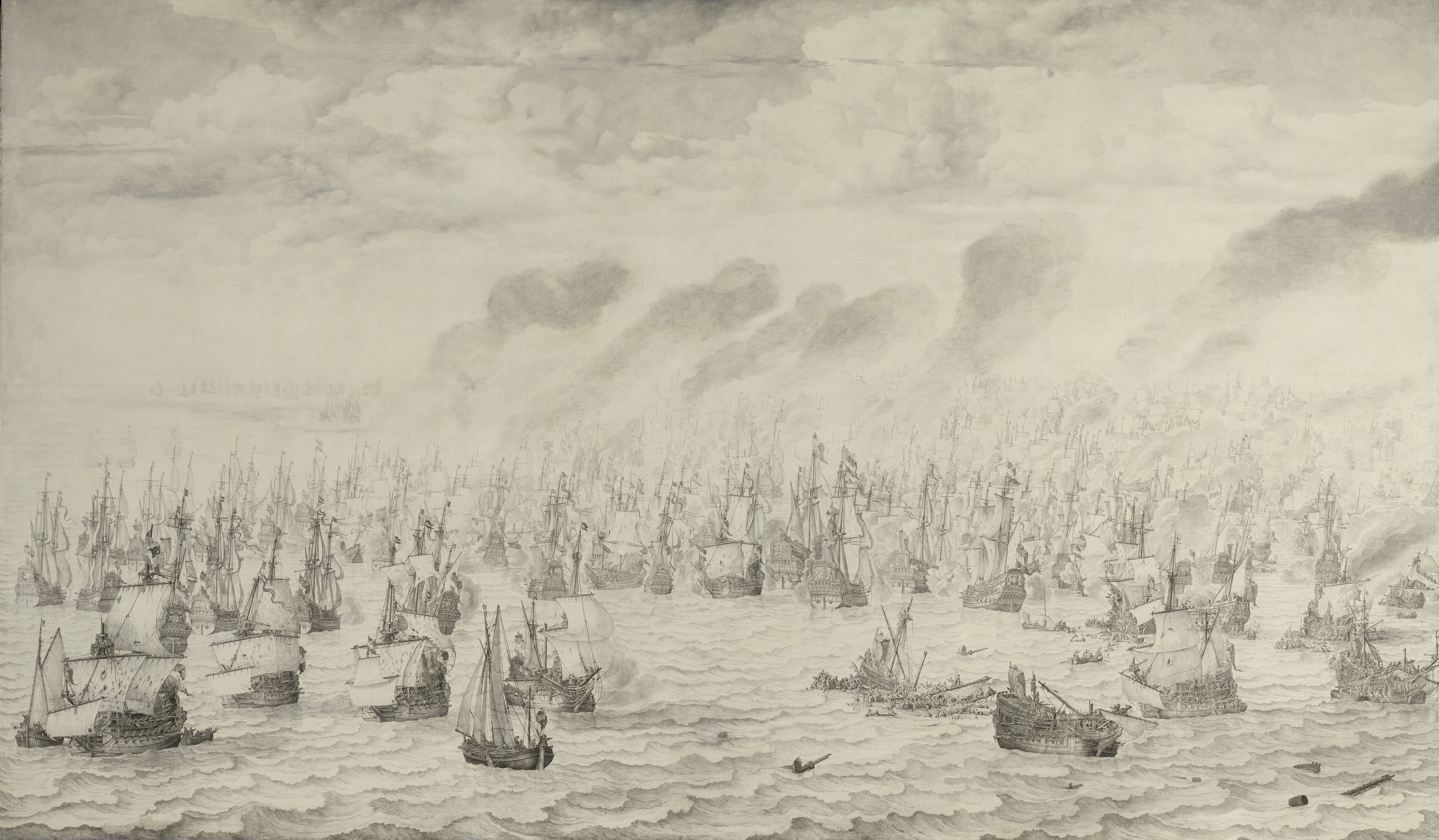
The Battle of Terheide, 10 August 1653: episode from the First Anglo-Dutch War (1652–54) by Willem van de Velde the Elder

The death of Tromp

== Aftermath ==
Both sides claimed a victory: the English because of their tactical superiority, the Dutch because the strategic goal of their attack, the lifting of the blockade, had been achieved. However, Tromp's death was a severe blow to the Dutch – few now expected to beat the English; the Orangist faction lost political influence and Grand Pensionary Johan de Witt was willing to give formal treaty assurances to Cromwell that the infant William III of Orange would never become stadtholder, thus turning the Netherlands into a base for a Stuart restoration. Peace negotiations began in earnest, leading to the 1654 Treaty of Westminster.

The damage done to the Dutch fleet effectively ended the first war.

== Sources ==
- Lawrence, Richard Russell (2003), The mammoth book of eyewitness naval battles (illustrated, reprint ed.), Carroll & Graf, pp. 92–94, ISBN 9780786712380
- Plant, David (15 March 2010), The Battle of Scheveningen 1653, BCW Project
- Rickard, J. (19 August 2009), Battle of Scheveningen, 31 July 1653
- Palmer, M. A.J. (April 1997). "The 'Military Revolution' Afloat: The Era of the Anglo-Dutch Wars and the Transition to Modern Warfare at Sea". War in History. 4 (2): 123–149. doi:10.1177/096834459700400201. JSTOR 26004420. S2CID 159657621.
- Prud'homme van Reine, Ronald (2009). Opkomst en Ondergang van Nederlands Gouden Vloot – Door de ogen van de zeeschilders Willem van de Velde de Oude en de Jonge. Amsterdam: De Arbeiderspers. ISBN 978-90-295-6696-4.
- Blok, P.J. (1928). Michiel de Ruyter (PDF) (in Dutch). Martinus Nijhof.
