= Piet Pieterszoon Hein =

Dutch admiral (1577–1629)

Piet Hein
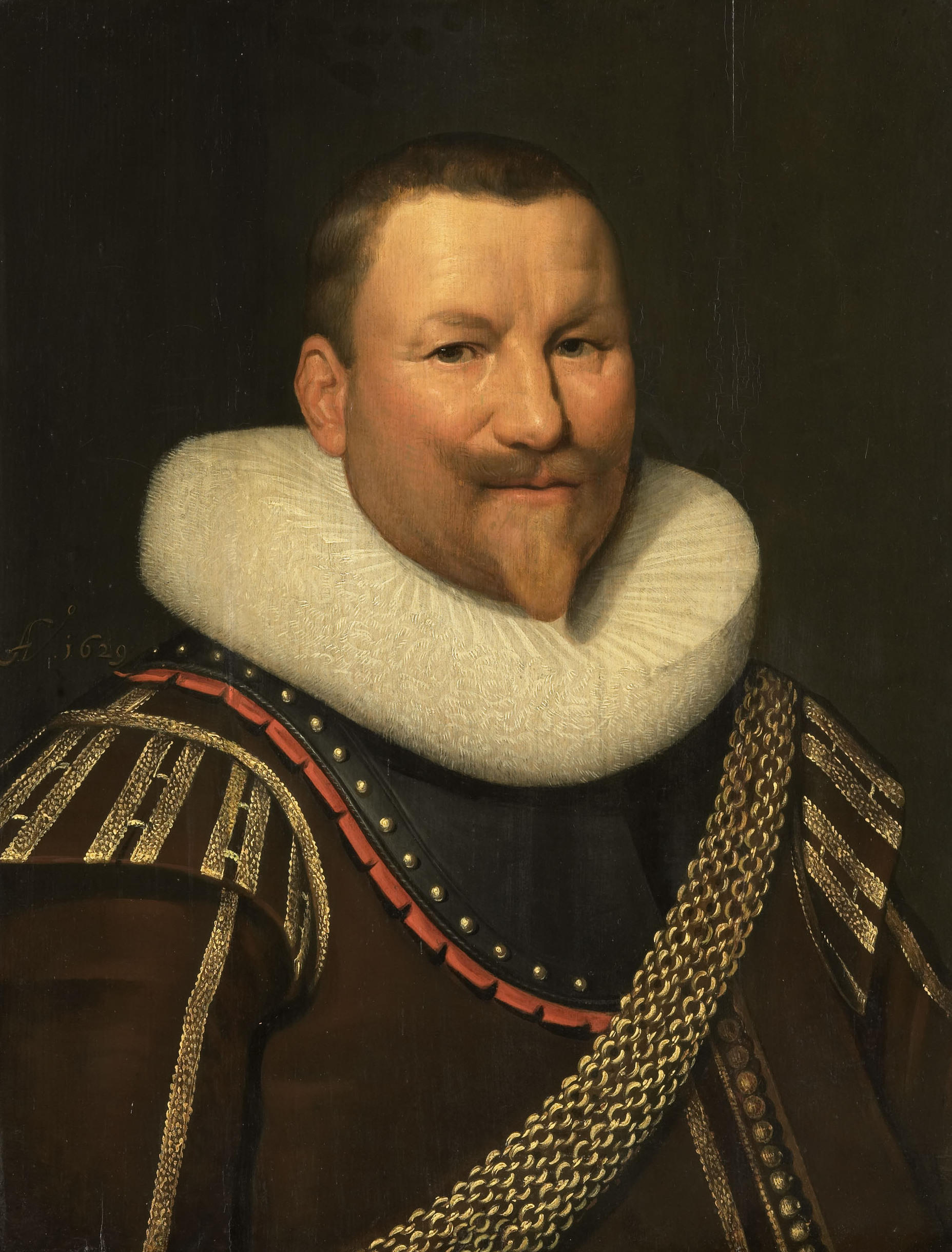
- 1629 portrait
- Born: Piet Pietersen Heyn; 25 November 1577; Delfshaven, County of Holland
- Died: 18 June 1629 (aged 51)
- Burial place: Oude Kerk, Delft, the Netherlands
- Military career
- Allegiance: Dutch Republic
- Conflicts: Dutch conquest of the Banda Islands; Eighty Years' War; Dutch-Portuguese War; Capture of Salvador; Filips van Zuylen's campaign against Luanda; Battle in the Bay of San Salvador; Battle in the Bay of Matanzas; Action of 18 June 1629

Piet Pieterszoon Hein (25 November 1577 – 18 June 1629) was a Dutch admiral and privateer for the Dutch Republic during the Eighty Years' War. Hein was the first and the last to capture a large part of a Spanish treasure fleet which transported huge amounts of gold and silver from Spanish America to Spain. The amount of silver taken was so large that it resulted in the rise of the price of silver worldwide and the near bankruptcy of Spain.

== Early life ==
Hein was born in Delfshaven (now part of Rotterdam), the son of a sea captain, and became a sailor while he was still a teenager. During his first journeys he suffered from extreme motion sickness.

In 1598, in his twenties, Hein and his father were taken captive by the Spanish. Hein was deployed as a galley slave in the fleet of Ambrosio Spinola, moored near Sluis for about four years, probably between 1598 and 1602, when he was traded for Spanish prisoners.

In 1603, Hein became a captain of Kleine Neptunus, was captured again and imprisoned in the fort of Havana. His fate was unknown in his homeland, so a merchant Jan Gerritszoon Meerman went on a trading voyage to Cuba in 1605, with the intention to gather information about Hein.

== Naval career ==
=== Dutch East India Company ===
In 1607 Hein joined the Dutch East India Company (VOC) and left for Asia, returning in the rank of captain (of the Hollandia) five years later. He married Anneke Claesdochter de Reus and settled in Rotterdam.

In April 1609 Verhoeff arrived on Banda Neira and tried to force the establishment of a fort. However, the Bandanese preferred free trade, as they were unwilling to limit their custom to only the Dutch. The VOC aimed for a monopsony on the spice trade so that the Bandanese could only sell their products to the Dutch. Negotiations were difficult, and at one point the village chiefs lured Verhoeff and two other commanders, who had left their ships to negotiate on the beach, into a trap in the forest and murdered them there in the end of May 1609. In retaliation, several Bandanese villages were plundered and ships destroyed; Hein was probably not involved in this action, because he did not yet have a military position at the time. In August a peace was concluded in favour of the VOC: the Bandanese recognized Dutch authority and a monopoly on the spice trade. This was a direct cause of the Dutch conquest of the Banda Islands (1609–1621). Hein replaced Verhoeff as the fleet's commander.

In 1618, when he was captain of the Neptunus, both he and his ship were pressed into service by the Republic of Venice. In 1621, he left his vessel behind and traveled overland to the Netherlands.

For a year in 1622, he was a member of the local government of Rotterdam, although he did not have citizenship of this city: the cousin of his wife, one of the three burgomasters, made this possible.

=== Dutch West India Company ===
After capital had been raised for the Dutch West India Company, the company's directors, the Heeren XIX, devised the Groot Desseyn in October 1623. The plan was to first seize the capital of Brazil, São Salvador da Bahia (Salvador), and then the main Portuguese fort on the coast of Angola, São Paulo de Loanda (Luanda). In this way, the company would control both the lucrative sugar plantations in Brazil and the Atlantic slave trade. Control of the trade itself was necessary because of the high mortality rate from the plantations' harsh conditions and tropical diseases such as malaria.

In the same year, Hein became vice-admiral of the new Dutch West India Company, and sailed to the West Indies the following year with a fleet of 26 ships and 3,300 men. In Colonial Brazil, he briefly captured the settlement of Salvador, personally leading the assault on the sea fortress of that town. In August, with a small and undermanned fleet, he sailed for the African west coast and attacked a Portuguese fleet in the strongly defended bay of Luanda, but failed to capture any ships.

=== Privateering ===
He then crossed the Atlantic Ocean again to try and capture merchant ships at the city of Vitória, but was defeated by resistance organized by the local citizenry with the assistance of the Portuguese garrison. After finding that Salvador had been recaptured by a large Spanish–Portuguese fleet, Hein returned home. The Dutch West India Company, pleased with Hein's leadership, placed him in command of a new squadron in 1626. In subsequent raids during 1627 at Salvador, he attacked and captured over 30 richly laden Portuguese merchant ships before returning to the Dutch Republic.

=== Spanish treasure fleet ===
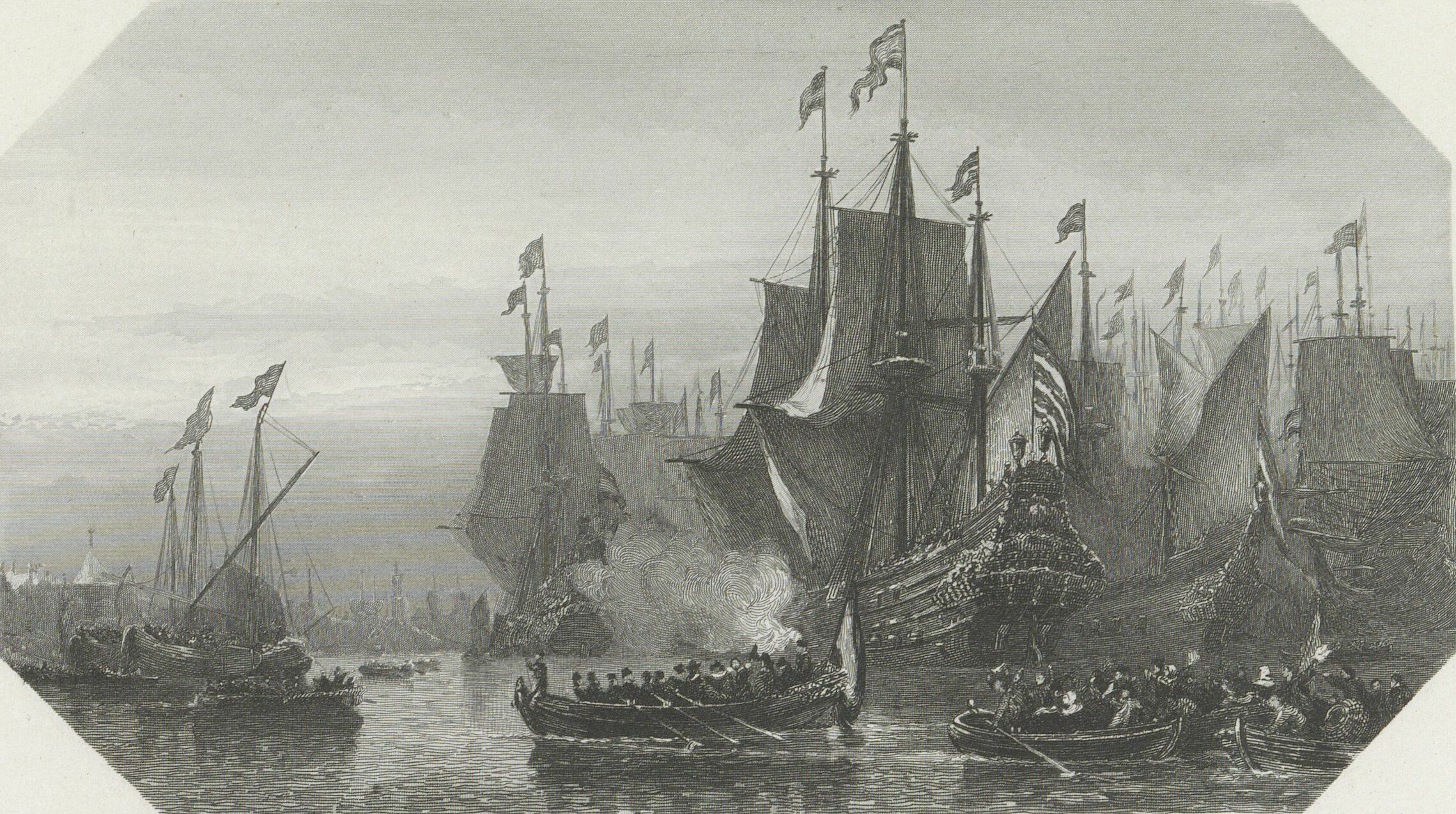
The arrival of Piet Hein in Holland, 1629

In 1628, during the Eighty Years' War, Admiral Hein, with Witte de With as his flag captain, sailed out to capture a Spanish treasure fleet loaded with silver from the Spanish American colonies and the Philippines. With him was Admiral Hendrick Lonck. He was later joined by a squadron under Vice-Admiral Joost Banckert, as well as the pirate Moses Cohen Henriques. Part of the Spanish fleet in Venezuela had been warned because a Dutch cabin boy had lost his way on Blanquilla island and was captured and betrayed the plan, but the other part from Mexico continued on its voyage, unaware of the threat. Sixteen Spanish ships were intercepted and captured: one galleon was taken after a surprise encounter during the night, nine smaller merchants were talked into surrendering, two fleeing small ships were taken at sea, and four fleeing galleons were trapped on the Cuban coast in the Bay of Matanzas.

After some musket volleys from Dutch sloops, the crews of the galleons also surrendered and Hein captured 11,509,524 guilders of booty in gold, silver, and other expensive trade goods, such as indigo and cochineal, without any bloodshed. The Dutch did not take prisoners: they gave the Spanish crews ample supplies for a march to Havana. The released were surprised to hear the admiral personally giving them directions in fluent Spanish; Hein after all was well acquainted with the region as he had been confined to it during his internment after 1603.

The capture of the treasure fleet was the Dutch West India Company's greatest victory in the Caribbean. It enabled the Dutch, at war with Spain, to fund their army for eight months (and as a direct consequence, allowing it to capture the fortress 's-Hertogenbosch), and the shareholders enjoyed a cash dividend of 50% for that year. The financial loss strategically weakened their Spanish enemy. Hein returned to the Netherlands in 1629, where he was hailed as a hero. Watching the crowds cheering him as he stood on the balcony of the town hall of Leyden, he remarked to the burgomaster: "Now they praise me because I gained riches without the least danger; but earlier when I risked my life in full combat they didn't even know I existed...". Hein was the first and the last to capture such a large part of a Spanish "silver fleet".

=== Lieutenant-Admiral ===
Hein became, after a conflict with the Dutch West India Company about policy and payment, Lieutenant-Admiral of Holland and West Frisia on 26 March 1629, and thus factual supreme commander of the confederate Dutch fleet, taking Maarten Tromp as flag captain.

He died the same year in a campaign against the Dunkirkers, the highly effective fleet of Habsburg commerce raiders and privateers operating from Dunkirk. His flotilla intercepted three privateers from Ostend. Hein sailed his flagship between two enemy ships to give them simultaneous broadsides. After half an hour, he was hit in the left shoulder by a cannonball and died instantly. He is buried in the Oude Kerk in Delft.

== Commemoration ==
The Piet Hein Tunnel in Amsterdam is named in his honor, as is the former Dutch Kortenaer-class frigate, HNLMS Piet Heyn. A direct descendant of Hein was Piet Hein, a famous 20th century Danish mathematician, physicist and poet. A song praising Admiral Hein's capture of the Spanish "silver fleet" written in 1844 is still sung by choirs and children at primary school in the Netherlands, as well as during traditional drinks by student unions in Belgian universities. A statue of him stands in his native Delfshaven, now a district in Rotterdam, and one in the Cuban city of Matanzas near where the silver fleet battle occurred.

== Views on slavery ==
Piet Hein rejected the slavery in the Spanish New World colonies, as the inhumane treatment of fellow human beings. Dutch historian Siebe Thissen suggests that he rejected slavery after his 10 years capture by the Spanish empire. During this capture, Hein served as a galley slave. It is unclear how this rejection of slavery fits in his activities for the Dutch West India Company, and his contributions to their Groot Desseyn.

There is an ongoing debate on the meaning of slavery within Dutch history, in which Piet Hein is an anachronistic figure head. On the one hand, some modern critiques attribute the evils of the Dutch Atlantic slave trade to him. On the other hand, he is still used as a hero figure, within a 19th-century expression of romantic idealism. In June 2020 his statue in Delfshaven was defaced.
