= Anglo-Dutch wars =

Series of wars during the 17th and 18th centuries

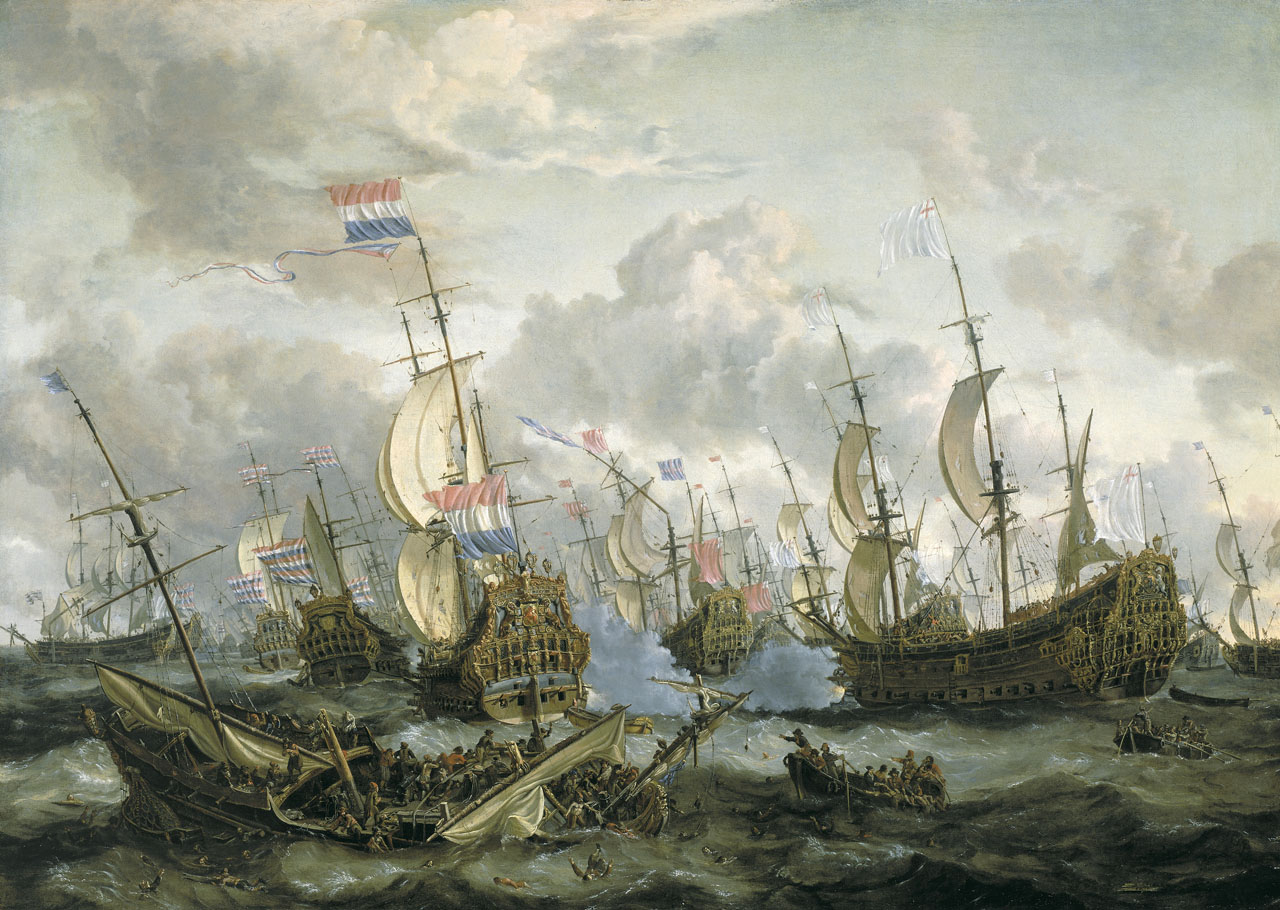
- The Four Days' Battle, by Abraham Storck
Date	1652–1654 First Anglo-Dutch War 1665–1667 Second Anglo-Dutch War 1672–1674 Third Anglo-Dutch War 1780–1784 Fourth Anglo-Dutch War
Location	English Channel, North Sea

The Anglo–Dutch wars (Dutch: Engels–Nederlandse Oorlogen) were a series of four conflicts fought between the Dutch Republic and the states of England and Great Britain between 1652 and 1784. The first three wars occurred in the second half of the 17th century due to Anglo-Dutch tensions over trade and colonial expansion, while the fourth conflict was fought more than a century later. Almost all the battles were naval engagements.

England was successful in the first war, while the Dutch were successful in the second and third wars. However, in the century between the third and fourth war, the Royal Navy had become the most powerful maritime force in the world, while the Dutch States Navy had fallen to fourth position, behind the French and Spanish navies, and the fourth war was a profound humiliation for the Dutch. During the French Revolutionary and Napoleonic Wars, British and Dutch forces continued to engage in intermittent conflict, which resulted in Britain capturing most of the Dutch colonial empire and annihilating much of the Dutch navy.

== Background ==
The English and the Dutch were both participants in the 16th century European religious conflicts during the Reformation period between the Roman Catholic House of Habsburg and the opposing Protestant states. At the same time, as the Age of Exploration dawned in the West, the Dutch and English both sought profits overseas in the New World of the recently discovered continents of the Americas.

=== Dutch Republic ===
In the early 1600s, the Dutch, while continuing to fight the Eighty Years' War (1566/1568–1648), with the Habsburgs, also began to carry out long-distance exploration by sea. The Dutch innovation in the trading of shares in a joint-stock company allowed them to finance expeditions with stock subscriptions sold in the United Provinces of the Netherlands and in London. They founded colonies in North America, India, and the East Indies. They also enjoyed continued success in privateering – in 1628 Admiral Piet Heyn became the only commander to successfully capture a large Spanish treasure fleet. With the many long voyages by Dutch East Indiamen cargo vessels, their society built an officer class and institutional knowledge that would later be replicated in England, principally by the British East India Company.

By the middle of the 17th century, the Dutch joined the Portuguese and their Portuguese Empire as the main European traders in Asia. This coincided with the enormous growth of the Dutch merchant fleet, made possible by the cheap mass production of the fluyt sailing ship types. Soon the Dutch had one of Europe's largest mercantile fleets, with more merchant ships than all other nations combined, and possessed a dominant position in the Baltic maritime trade of 1400–1800 in the Baltic Sea to the northeast.

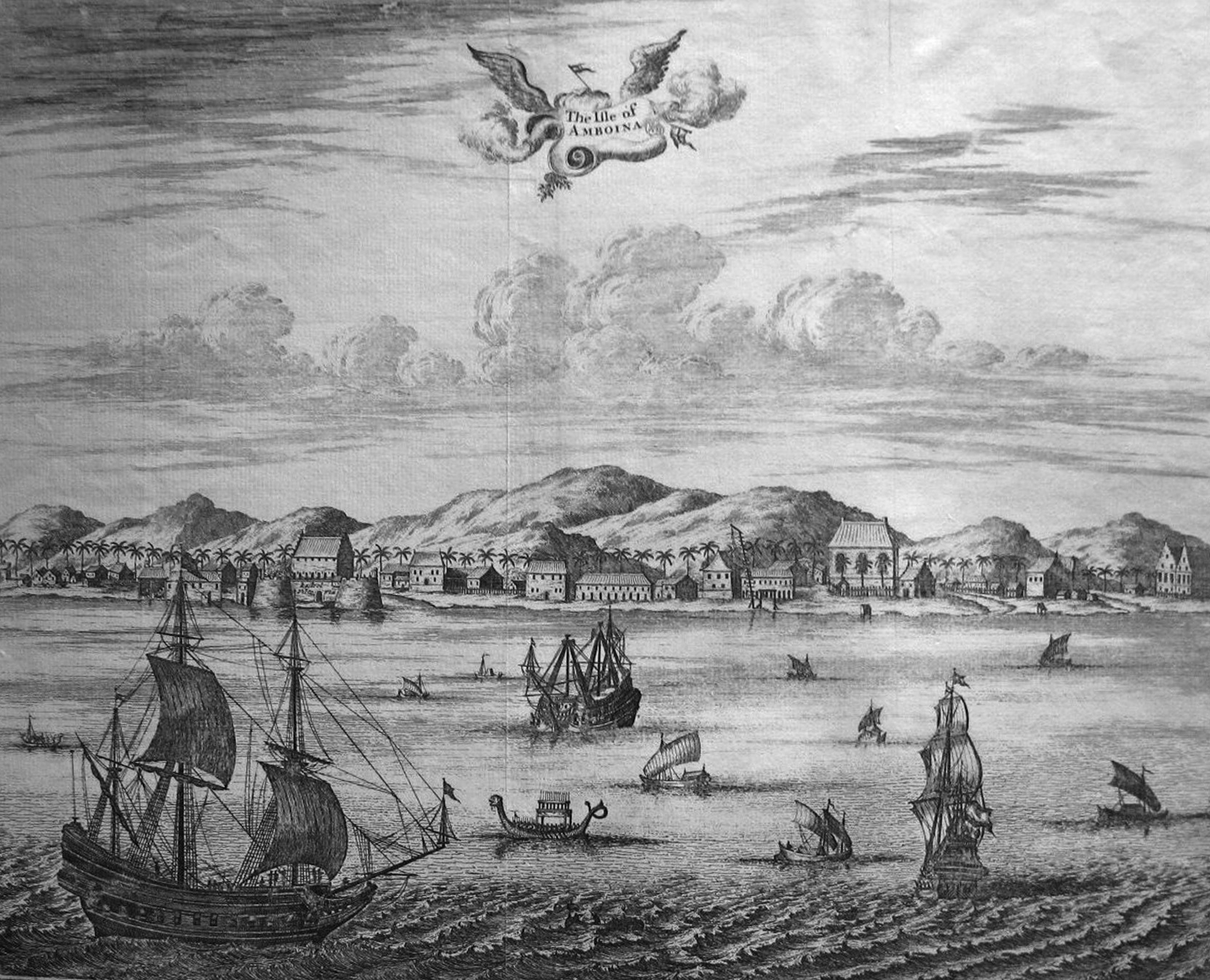
Dutch factory at Ambon Island, early to mid-17th century

In 1648 the Dutch concluded the Peace of Münster with the Kingdom of Spain. Due to the division of powers in the Dutch Republic, the army and navy were the main base of power of the Stadtholder, although the budget allocated to them was set by the States General. With the arrival of peace, the States General decided to decommission most of the Dutch military. This led to conflict between the major Dutch cities and the new Stadtholder, William II of Orange, bringing the internal controversies in the Republic to the brink of civil war. The Stadtholder's unexpected death in 1650 only added to the political tensions.

=== England ===
==== Tudor dynasty ====
In the 16th century, Queen Elizabeth I (1533–1603, reigned 1558–1603) commissioned several privateers to carry out long-range attacks against the Spanish Empire's global interests, exemplified by the attacks by Sir Francis Drake (c. 1540–1596), William Parker, and other Elizabethan sea dogs on Spanish merchant shipping and colonial possessions. Partly to provide a pretext for ongoing hostilities against Spain, Queen Elizabeth assisted the Dutch Revolt (1581) against the Kingdom of Spain by signing the Treaty of Nonsuch in 1585 with the newly-established Dutch state / republic of the United Provinces.

==== Stuart ====
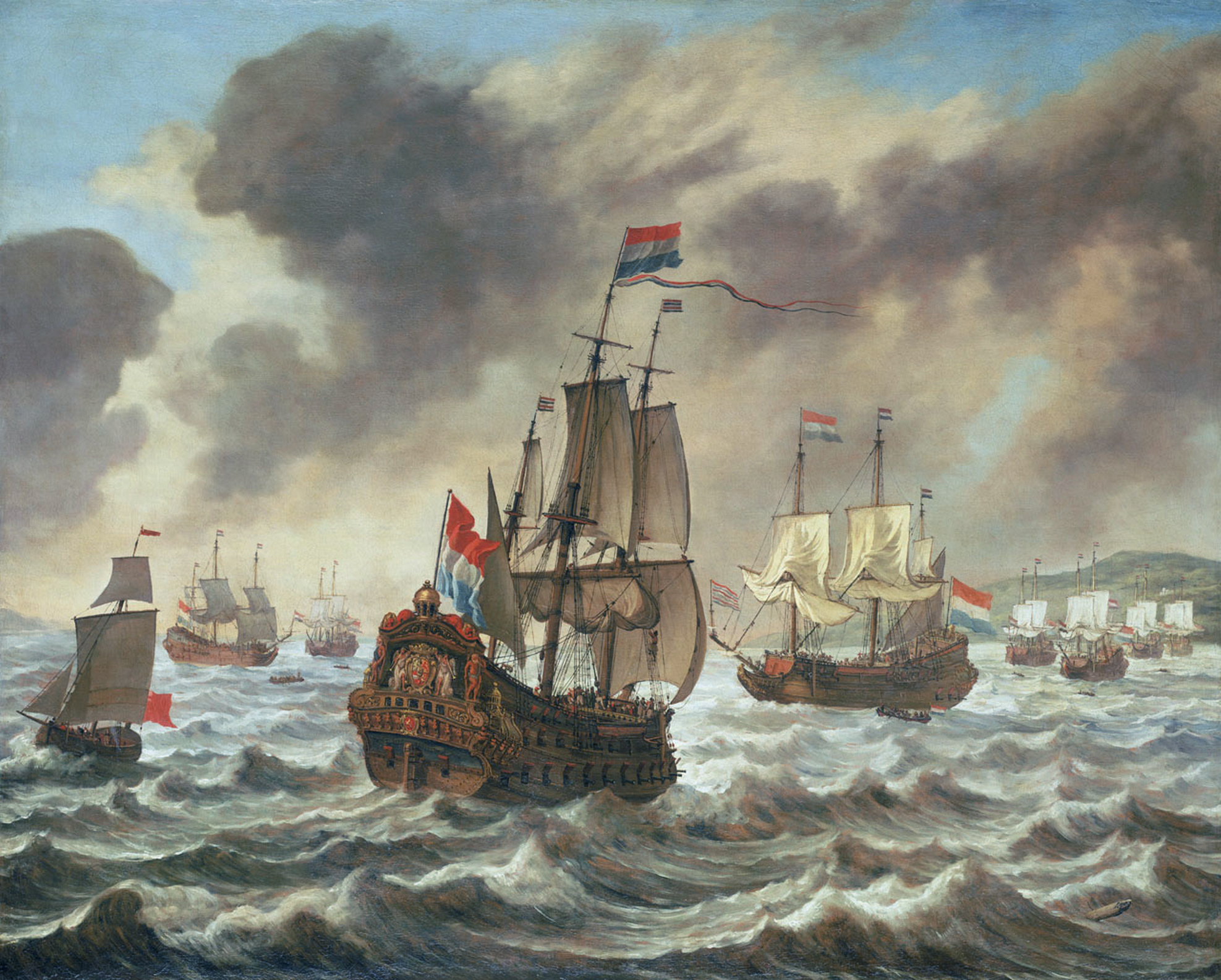
Before the Battle of the Downs by Reinier Nooms, circa 1639, depicting the Dutch blockade off the English coast, the vessel shown is the Aemilia, Tromp's flagship.

After the death of Elizabeth I, Anglo-Spanish relations began to improve under the new King, James I, and the peace of the Treaty of London in 1604 ended most privateering actions, (until the outbreak of the next Anglo-Spanish War (1625–1630) during the larger continental Thirty Years' War of 1618–1648). Underfunding then led to neglect of the Royal Navy.

Later, Roman Catholic sympathiser King Charles I of England made a number of secret agreements with Spain, directed against Dutch sea power. He also embarked on a major programme of naval reconstruction, enforcing ship money to rebuild and expand the Royal Navy with financing the building of such prestige battle vessels as the Sovereign of the Seas. But fearful of endangering his relations with the powerful Dutch stadtholder Frederick Henry, Prince of Orange, his assistance to Spain was limited in practice to allowing Spanish troops on their way to Dunkirk to make use of English shipping. However, in 1639, when a large Spanish transport fleet sought refuge in The Downs anchorage off the town of Deal, Kent, King Charles chose not to protect it against a Dutch attack; the resulting Battle of the Downs undermined both Spanish sea power and Charles's reputation in Spain.

Meanwhile, in the New World of the Americas, forces from the Dutch New Netherlands colony and the English Massachusetts Bay Colony contested over much of North America's north-eastern seaboard.

==== Cromwell ====
The outbreak of the English Civil War in 1642 (to 1651) began a period in which the Kingdom of England's naval position was severely weakened. Its navy was internally divided, though its officers tended to favour the parliamentary side; after the execution by public beheading of King Charles I in 1649, however, Lord Protector Oliver Cromwell (1599–1658, served 1653–1658) was able to unite Great Britain into the republican Commonwealth of England. He then revamped the English navy by expanding the number of ships, promoting officers on merit rather than family connections, and cracking down on embezzlement by suppliers and dockyard staff, thereby positioning England to mount a global challenge to Dutch mercantile dominance.

The mood in England grew increasingly belligerent towards the Dutch. This partly stemmed from old perceived slights: the Dutch were considered to have shown themselves ungrateful for the aid they had received against the Spanish by growing stronger than their former English protectors; Dutch fishermen caught most of the herring off the English east coast in the North Sea; the Dutch East India Company had driven English traders out of the East Indies; and Dutch merchants vociferously appealed to the principle of free trade to circumvent taxation in English colonies. There were also new points of conflict: with the decline of Spanish power at the end of the Thirty Years' War in 1648, the colonial possessions of the Portuguese Empire (already in the midst of the Portuguese Restoration War, 1640–1668) and perhaps even those of the greater Spanish Empire itself were up for grabs.

Cromwell feared the influence of both the Orangist faction at home and English royalists exiled to the Republic; the Stadtholders had supported the Stuart monarchs – William II of Orange had married the daughter of Charles I of England in 1641 – and they abhorred the trial and execution of Charles I.

Early in 1651 Cromwell tried to ease tensions by sending a delegation to The Hague proposing that the Dutch Republic join the Commonwealth and assist the English in conquering most of Spanish America for its extremely valuable resources. This attempt to draw the Dutch into a lopsided alliance with England in fact led to war: the ruling faction in the States of Holland was unable to formulate an answer to this unexpected offer and the pro-Stuart Orangists incited mobs to harass Cromwell's envoys. When the delegation returned home, the Parliament of England decided to pursue a policy of confrontation.

== Wars ==
=== First war: 1652–1654 ===
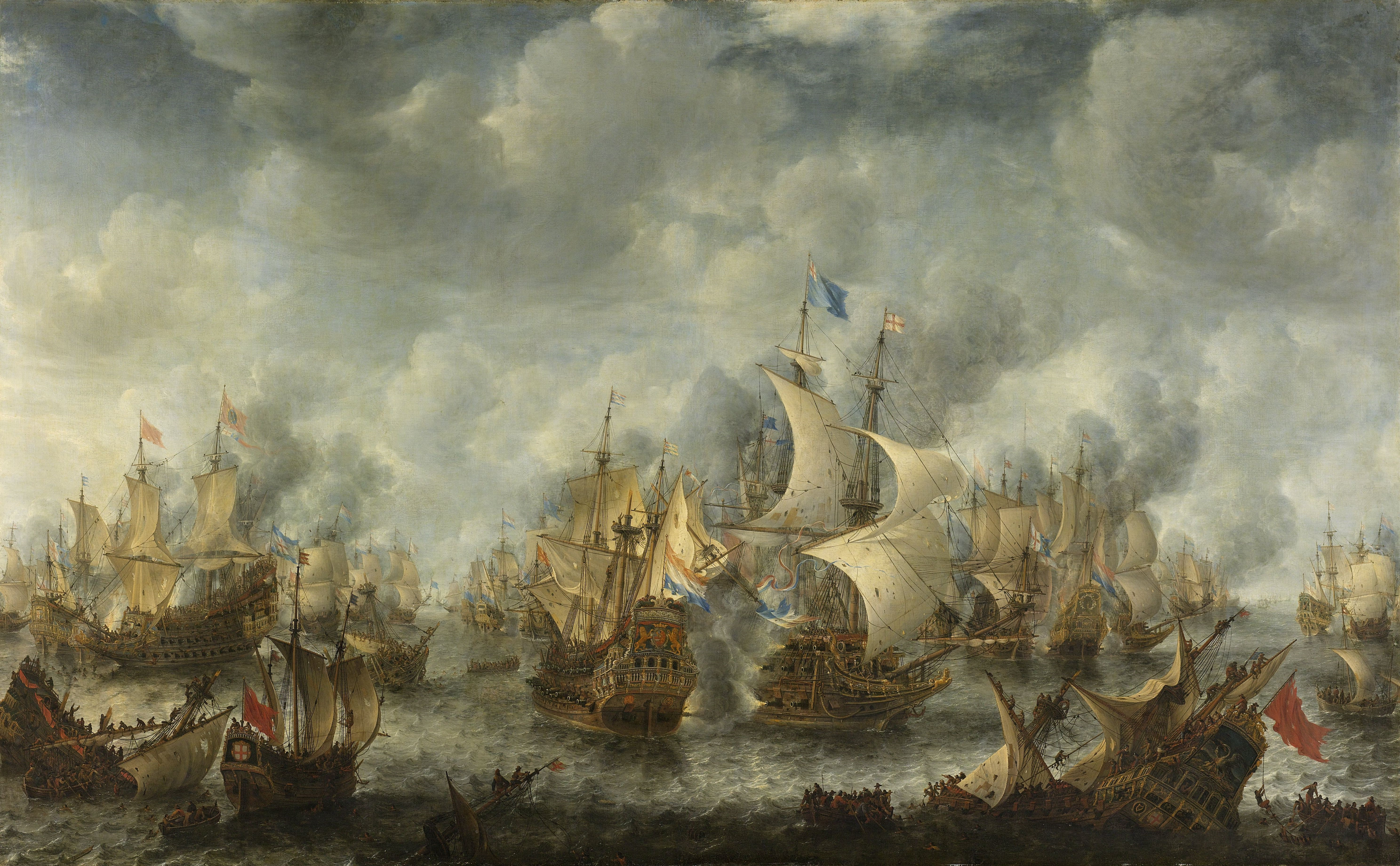
The Battle of Scheveningen, 10 August 1653

As a result of Cromwell's ambitious programme of naval expansion, at a time when the Dutch admiralties were selling off many of their own warships, the English came to possess a greater number of larger and more powerful purpose-built warships than their rivals across the North Sea did. However, the Dutch had many more merchant ships, together with lower freight rates, better financing and a wider range of manufactured goods to sell – although Dutch ships were blocked by the Spanish from operations in most of southern Europe, along the coasts of the Mediterranean Sea, giving the English an advantage there.

To protect English commercial interests in North America, in October 1651 the English Parliament passed the first of the Navigation Acts, which mandated that all goods imported into England must be carried by English ships or vessels from the exporting countries, thus excluding (mostly Dutch) middlemen. Agitation among the Dutch merchants as a result of the Navigation Acts was further increased by Admiral Sir George Ayscue's (1616–1652) capture in early 1652 of 27 Dutch merchant ships illegally trading with the English still royalist colony of Barbados in the West Indies, in contravention of an embargo imposed by the Parliamentarians. The Dutch responded to the growing tensions by enlisting large numbers of armed merchantmen into their navy. In 1652, Lord Protector Cromwell required all foreign warships in the North Sea or the English Channel to lower their colours when encountering English warships. On 29 May 1652, Lieutenant-Admiral Maarten Tromp (1598–1653), refused to lower the colours of his ships after encountering an English fleet led by General at Sea Robert Blake (1598–1657). This resulted in a skirmish, the Battle of Dover, off the coast of Dover, England in the English Channel in 1652, after which the Commonwealth of England then declared war on the Dutch Republic on 10 July.

After some inconclusive minor fights the English were successful in the first major battle, with Blake defeating the Dutch Vice-Admiral Witte de With (1599–1658), in the Battle of the Kentish Knock in October 1652. Believing that the war was all but over, the English divided their forces and in December were routed by the fleet of Lieutenant-Admiral Maarten Tromp at the Battle of Dungeness in the English Channel. The Dutch were also victorious in March 1653, at the Battle of Leghorn near Italy and had gained effective control of both the Mediterranean and the English Channel. Blake, recovering from an injury, rethought, together with Duke of Albemarle George Monck (1608–1670), the whole system of naval tactics, and after the winter of 1653 used the line of battle, first to drive the Dutch navy out of the English Channel in the Battle of Portland and then out of the North Sea in the Battle of the Gabbard. The Dutch were unable to effectively resist as the States General of the Netherlands had not in time heeded the warnings of their admirals that much larger warships were needed.

In the final Battle of Scheveningen on 10 August 1653, Tromp was killed, a blow to Dutch morale, but the English had to end their blockade of the Dutch coast. As both nations were by now exhausted and Cromwell had dissolved the aggressive warlike Rump Parliament, ongoing peace negotiations could be brought to fruition, albeit after many months of slow diplomatic exchanges. The war ended on 5 April 1654, with the signing of the Treaty of Westminster of 1654 (ratified by the States General on 8 May), but the commercial rivalry was not resolved, the English having failed to replace the Dutch as the world's dominant trade nation. The treaty contained a secret annex, the Act of Seclusion, forbidding the infant Prince William III of Orange (later King William III of England) from becoming also the Dutch stadtholder of the province of Holland, which would prove to be a future cause of discontent. In 1653 the Dutch had started a major naval expansion programme of their own, building sixty larger vessels, partly closing the qualitative gap with the English naval fleet. Cromwell, having already started the Anglo-Spanish War against Spain in 1654 without Dutch help, during his rule then avoided a new conflict with the fellow Republic on the continent, even though the Dutch in the same time period defeated his Portuguese and Swedish allies.

=== Second war: 1665–1667 ===
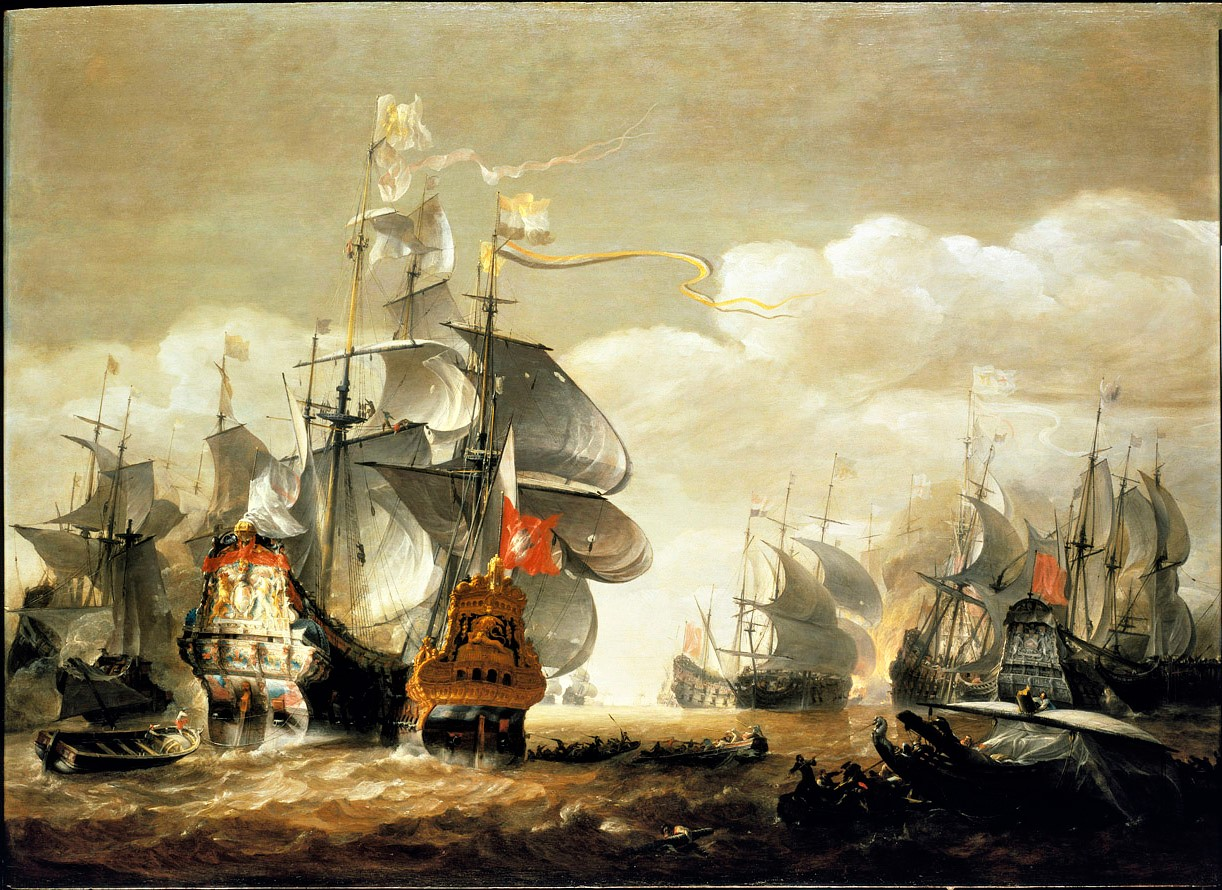
The Battle of Lowestoft, 13 June 1665

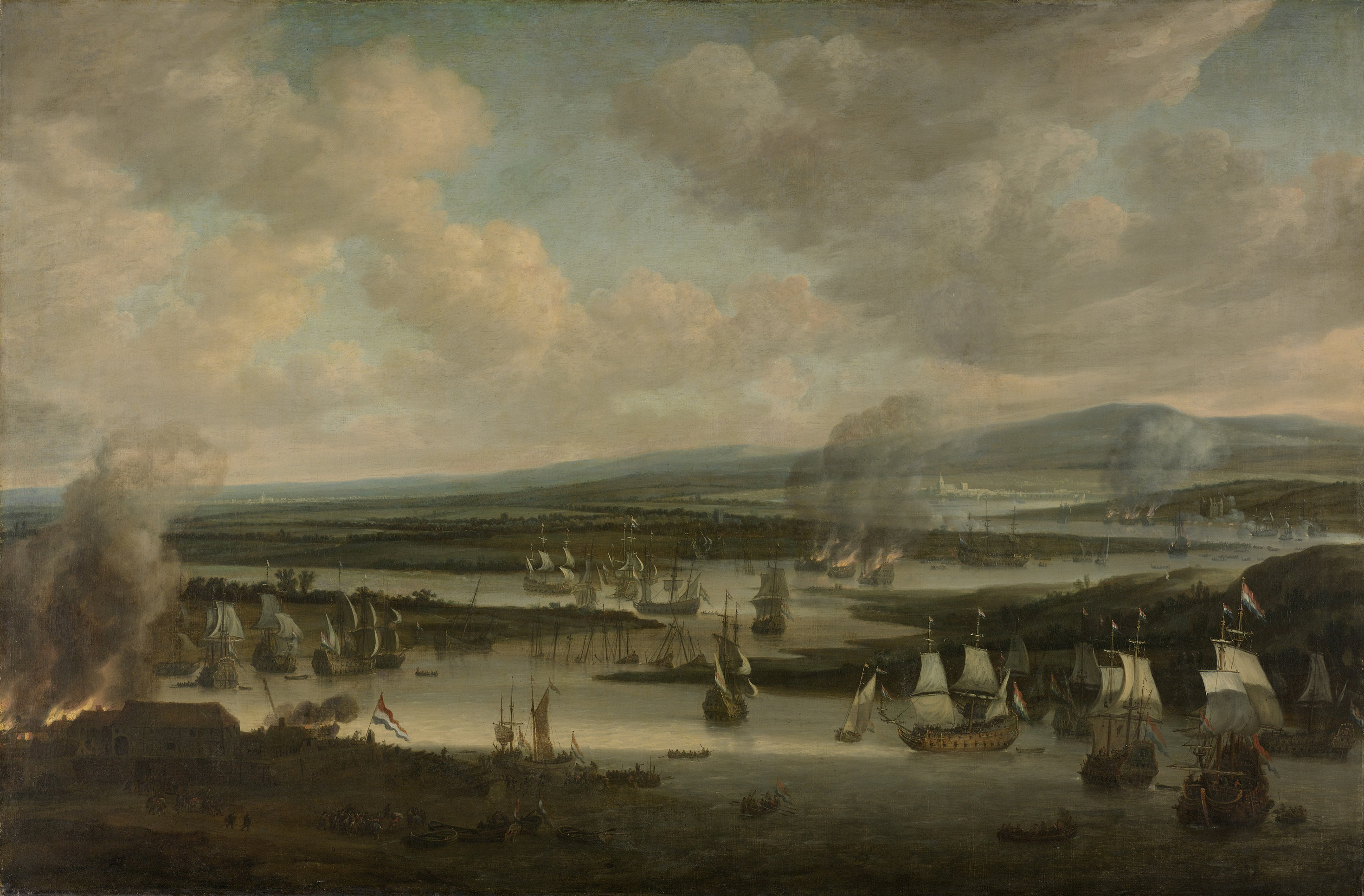
The 1667 raid on the Medway

After the English Restoration in 1660, newly-crowned King Charles II tried through diplomatic means to make his nephew, Prince William III of Orange, stadtholder of the Dutch Republic. At the same time, Charles promoted a series of mercantilist policies aimed at countering Dutch mercantile dominance, which again led to a renewed deterioration in Anglo-Dutch relations. This subsequently led to a surge of anti-Dutch sentiment in England, the country being, as Samuel Pepys put it, "mad for war". English merchants and chartered overseas mercantile trade companies – such as the East India Company, the Royal Adventurers Trading into Africa, and the Levant Company – calculated that global economic primacy could now be wrestled away from the Dutch. They reckoned that a combination of naval battles and irregular privateering missions would cripple the Dutch Republic and force the States General to agree to a more favourable peace. The plan was for English ships to be replenished, and sailors paid, with looted booty seized from captured Dutch merchant vessels returning from overseas.

In 1665 many Dutch merchantman ships were captured, and Dutch trade and industry were hurt. The English achieved several victories over the Dutch, such as taking the Dutch colony of New Netherland and the seaport town of New Amsterdam (the present-day New York) by an English fleet of King Charles' younger brother, the future King James II. But there were also several Dutch victories, such as the capture of the renewed Royal Navy flagship Prince Royal during the Four Days' Battle at sea of 11 to 14 June 1666—the subject of a famous painting by Willem van de Velde (1633–1707). Dutch maritime trade recovered from 1666, while the English war effort and economy suffered a downturn when London was ravaged by disease in the Great Plague during 1665–1666, and much of the capital of the City of London along the River Thames was burnt to the ground by the massive devastating infamous Great Fire of London of September 1666 (which was generally interpreted across the English Channel in the Dutch Republic as divine retribution for the earlier Holmes's Bonfire raid in August 1666).

A surprise attack in June 1667, the raid on the Medway, on the English fleet in its home port, arguably won the war for the Dutch; British historian C. R. Boxer described it as one of the "most humiliating defeat[s] suffered by British arms". By 1667, Louis XIV's armies began their march into the Spanish Netherlands, the buffer zone between the Republic and France, the Dutch created a Triple Alliance with Sweden and Britain to push back against Louis. A flotilla of ships led by Michiel de Ruyter (1607–1676), sailed westward up the Thames River and Thames Estuary, on a daring raid, broke through the defences guarding Chatham Harbour, set fire to several English warships moored there, and even towed away HMS Unity and HMS Royal Charles, flagship and second largest warship of the Royal Navy. Also in June 1667, the Dutch sailed vessels on a raiding expedition from the Caribbean north into the Hampton Roads harbour at the mouth of the Chesapeake Bay in the Battle of the James River, near the modern-day Hampton and Norfolk seaports of the English Colony of Virginia, destroying an English ship in the harbour and bombarding its coastal protecting fort. The raid on the Medway led to widespread anger in England towards the government. This, together with the mounting costs of the war and the extravagant spending of the returned King Charles's court, produced a rebellious atmosphere in London. Charles ordered the English envoys at Breda to sign a peace quickly with the Dutch, as he feared an open revolt at home against him.

=== Third war: 1672–1674 ===
The Battle of Texel, 21 August 1673

During the start of the war in 1672, Charles II proclaimed a declaration called the Declaration of Indulgence that suspended penalties against public Nonconformist and private Catholic worship. Soon the Royal Navy was rebuilt. After the events of the previous war, English public opinion was unenthusiastic about starting a new one. However, as he was bound by the secret Treaty of Dover, Charles II was obliged to assist Louis XIV in his attack on the Dutch Republic in the Franco-Dutch War. The Test Act was passed in 1673 as an extension of the Cavalier Code. When the Royal French Army was halted by the Hollandic Water Line (a defence system involving strategic flooding), an attempt was made to invade the Dutch Republic by sea. De Ruyter won a series of strategic victories against the Anglo-French fleet and prevented an invasion of the Dutch Republic. After these failures, the English parliament forced Charles to make peace.

=== Fourth war: 1780–1784 ===
In 1688, the Dutch feared that England might align with France in the upcoming Nine Years' War, potentially repeating the crisis of 1672. To prevent this, William of Orange, making use of an invitation from seven influential and discontented Englishmen, led a Dutch invasion force that landed at Torbay in Devon. From there, he marched on London and successfully deposed James II of England. While occupying London with his troops William was placed on the English throne, on the basis of the Bill of Rights, alongside his English wife Mary. His reign ended further Anglo-Dutch conflicts and the two states joined forces to fight the expansionist policies of Louis XIV of France. Though remaining allies, England (and after 1707, Great Britain) quickly surpassed the Dutch in military and economic power. From roughly 1720 onwards, Dutch economic growth experienced a significant decline, and in 1780, the per capita gross national income of Britain surpassed their Dutch counterparts, leading to rising levels of resentment from the latter.

The Diplomatic Revolution brought this to light and during the following Seven Years' War the Dutch remained neutral. When Britain's North American colonies revolted against British rule in 1776, the Dutch provided indirect support to the rebels, angering the British, who eventually declared war on the Dutch in 1780. By this point, the Dutch navy had severely weakened, possessing only 20 ships of the line. The conflict consisted mostly of a series of successful British operations against Dutch colonial interests, though one fleet action took place at the battle of Dogger Bank on 5 August 1781, which was indecisive. The war ended in a conclusive British victory and exposed the weakness of the political and economic foundations of the Dutch Republic, leading to instability and revolution.

=== Later wars ===
During the War of the First Coalition the French First Republic declared war on Britain and the Dutch Republic on 1 February 1793. The French Revolutionary Army proceeded to engage in the Flanders campaign against a combined force of British, Dutch, Austrian, German and French Royalist troops, occupying the Austrian Netherlands by mid-1794 and overrunning the Dutch Republic in the winter of that year. This resulted in the Dutch Republic being transformed into a French client state known as the Batavian Republic, a development which was greeted with alarm by the British government. In spring 1795 the British Admiralty ordered all Batavian ships in British ports to be detained by the Royal Navy, initiating an undeclared war between the two nations.

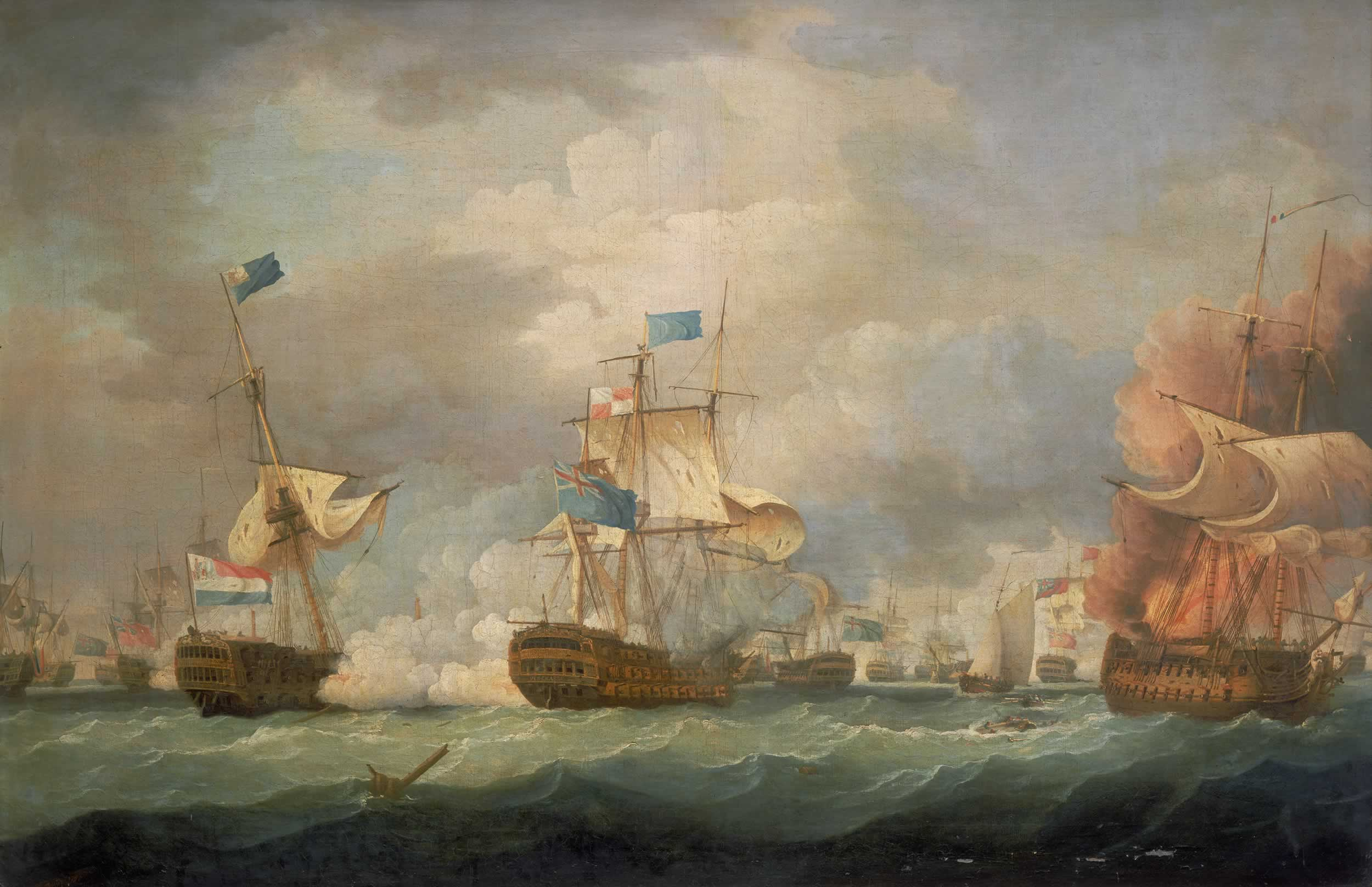
The Battle of Camperdown, which broke the Batavian Navy as an independent fighting force

Anglo-Batavian tensions continued to mount, resulting in the action of 22 August 1795 and Britain declaring war on the Batavian Republic on 15 September of that year, the same day a British expeditionary force captured the Cape Colony from the Dutch East India Company. The British and Batavian navies proceeded to engage in a series of naval battles culminating in the Battle of Camperdown of 11 October 1797, at which the Royal Navy's North Sea Fleet decisively defeated a Batavian fleet and broke the Batavian Navy as an independent fighting force. In the meantime British forces captured and occupied several Dutch colonies in the West Indies, South America, South Asia and Southeast Asia. The Batavian navy participated in unsuccessful French efforts to support the Irish Rebellion of 1798, while a combined Anglo-Russian expeditionary force carried out a failed invasion of Holland in 1799. On 27 March 1802 the Treaty of Amiens's signing resulted in peace between Britain and the Batavian Republic, with the British returning all captured Dutch colonies except for Ceylon.

Simmering Anglo-French tensions resulted in Britain declaring war on France and the Batavian Republic on 18 May 1803, sparking the Napoleonic Wars. First Consul Napoleon ordered the Batavian Navy to take part in his planned invasion of the United Kingdom, with a large flotilla of invasion barges being built in the Netherlands and sailing to the Camp of Boulogne. The barges ultimately saw no service as the invasion was called off in 1805. During the Napoleonic Wars Britain once again began attacking Dutch colonies, capturing all of those in the West Indies, South America and Southern Africa by 1807. British forces proceeded to move against Dutch colonies in the East Indies, capturing them all by 1811.

Napoleon, which had transformed the Batavian Republic into the Kingdom of Holland in 1806, annexed the Netherlands to France outright in 1810. During the War of the Sixth Coalition Russo-Prussian troops liberated the Netherlands' from French occupation, resulting in the establishment of the Sovereign Principality of the United Netherlands. The new Dutch state, as an ally of Britain, signed the Anglo-Dutch Treaty of 1814. Under the terms of the treaty Britain returned some of the Dutch colonies it had occupied though others were permanently ceded to British rule. Some historians count the wars between Britain and the Batavian Republic and the Kingdom of Holland during the Napoleonic era as the Fifth and Sixth Anglo–Dutch wars.

== See also ==
- British military history
- Dutch military history
- Netherlands–United Kingdom relations
