= Battle of Getaria =

1638 naval battle

Coordinates: 43.3000°N 2.2000°W

- Part of Franco-Spanish War (1635–59)
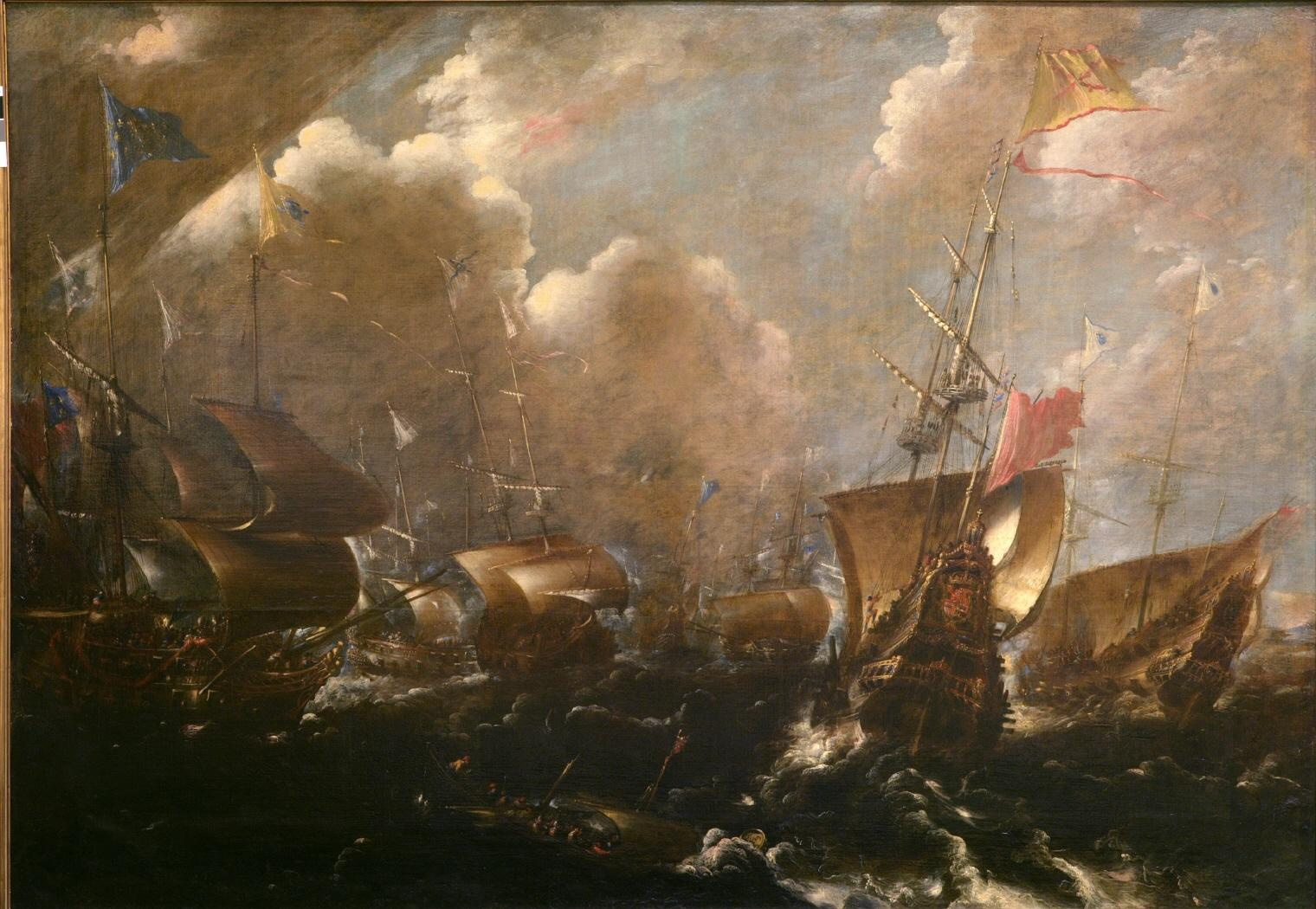
- Battle of Getaria, by Andries van Eertvelt
Date	22 August 1638
Location	Getaria, Bay of Biscay, Spain
Result	French victory

Belligerents
France	Spain

Commanders and leaders
(Kingdom of France) Henri de Sourdis (Kingdom of France) Claude de Launay-Razilly	(Spain) Lope de Hoces

Strength
27 warships (Note: French Order of Battle: La Couronne, 72 cannons, 500 men vice-admiral, Claude de Launay-Razilly; Navire du Roi, (52) 300 men, flag, Philippe des Gouttes; Vaisseau de la Reine, (38), 245 men, Danerac: La Vierge, (34), 245 men, Jacques du Mé; Le Cardinal,(30), 245 men, de Coypeauville; Le Triomphe, (30), 205 men, de Caen; La Victoire, (30), 205 men, Contenaut; Saint-Louis de Hollande, (24), 205 men, Treillebois; Trois-Rois: (30), 205 men, Baptiste; La Fortune, (30), 205 men, de Casenac; L'Europe, (34), 205 men, Chevalier Jules de Montigny; Le Triton, (30), 155 men, Villemoulin; Le Faucon, (30), 155 men, Dumenillet; Le Cygne, (30), 205 men, Chevalier de Cangé; Le Cocq, (30), 205 men, de Chastelus; La Licorne, (30), 205 men, La Chesnaye; Le Corail, (30), 205 men, de Porte-Noire; L'Emerillon, 125 men, de Morsay; Le Saint-Charles, (28), 155 men, Saint-Etienne; Le Dauphin du Havre, (28), 155 men, Boisjoly; La Perle, (24), 125 men, La Roullerie; La Renommée, (24), 125 men, Daniel; L'Intendant, (24), 125 men, de Conflans; Le Saint-Jean, (24), 125 men, Abraham Duquesne; La Magdelaine de Brest, (24) 125 men, Louis de Senantes; Turc, 100 men, Jean Guiton; Saint-Francois, (16) 100 men, Regnier; Marguerite, (14), 100 men, La Treille; Hermine, (14), 100 men, de Lignieres; Neptune, (16), 100 men, Chevalier Paul; Esperance-en–Dieu, (24) 100 men, Chevalier Garnier; Petit-Saint-Jean, (16) 100 men, Razet / De Broq; Fregate du Havre, 66 men, Clerisse; Royale, (8), 82 men, Savigny; Cardinale, (8), 92 men, Baronnie; Lion; Nassau; Licorne; Grande Fregate de Brest, (8), 92 men; Flibot de Brest); 7 fireships, 5,000 men	12–14 galleons (Note: At this stage of naval development, the main distinction between galleons and ships of the line was the former could also be used to transport commercial cargoes, the latter could not), 2 Dunkirk privateers, 3-14 frigates, (Note: Spanish Order of Battle (partial); Capitana, de Hoces; Santiago, Nicolas Judice; Neptuno; Santa Teresa; Carmen; San Juan; Nuestra Senora de la Anunciacion; Nuestra Señora del Caro); 4,000–7,000 men

Casualties and losses
No ships lost, 40 dead	All ships destroyed, except one; 3,000–4,000 dead

The Battle of Getaria (Note: also spelt Guetaria) was fought on 22 August 1638 during the Franco-Spanish War (1635–59), at Getaria, in northern Spain. A French naval force commanded by Henri de Sourdis attacked and destroyed a Spanish squadron under Lope de Hoces, who survived but was killed at the Battle of the Downs in 1639.

The French fleet was being used to support the siege of Fuenterrabía, a vital Spanish port. By early August, the blockade meant the town was close to starvation. To provide time for a relief force to reach the defenders, de Hoces was ordered to draw their ships away; despite the near total destruction of his force, the siege was lifted in September 1638.

Although ultimately Getaria had little strategic impact, it was the first significant victory for the newly formed French Navy; Cardinal Richelieu viewed it as vindication of the decision taken in 1624 to invest large sums in its expansion.

== Background ==
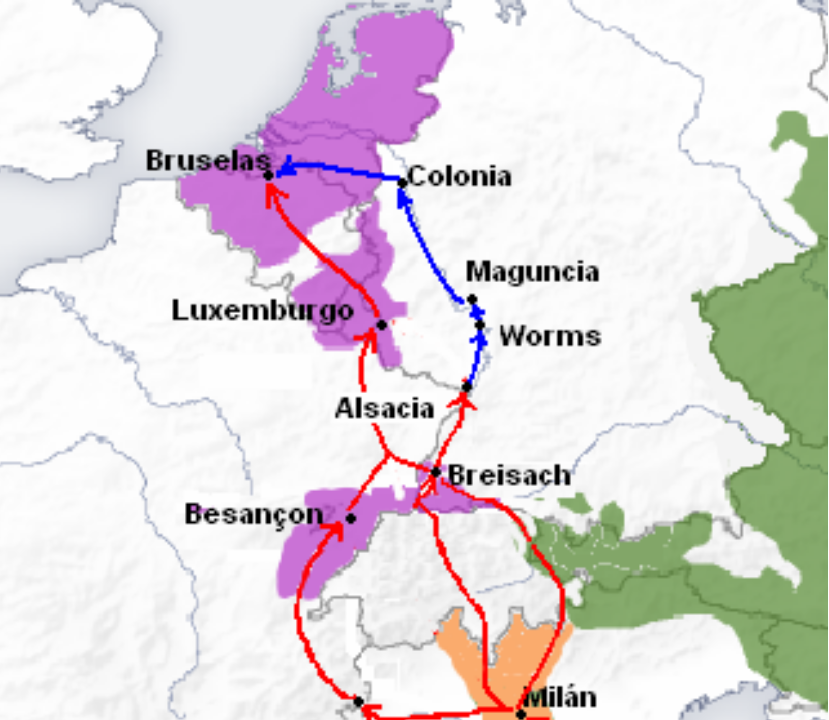
The Spanish Road

Prior to the outbreak of the Franco-Spanish War in 1635, Spain was already engaged in the Eighty Years War with the Dutch Republic, as well as supporting Emperor Ferdinand II in the Thirty Years War. Although it was the predominant European superpower with much greater resources than France, fighting in multiple theatres relied on long and vulnerable lines of communication. The most important was the Spanish Road, an overland route funneling troops and supplies from Spanish possessions in Italy to their armies in Flanders. This was crucial since Dutch naval superiority made it difficult to send these by sea.

However, by 1638 the French and their allies were threatening to sever the Road at key points in Milan, the Grisons and Breisach in Alsace (see Map). In June, Cardinal Richelieu increased the pressure by sending an army under Condé over the Pyrenees to besiege Fuenterrabía, supported by elements of the newly created Flotte du Ponant, or Atlantic squadron, commanded by Henri de Sourdis. At the same time, the Dutch prepared to attack the ports of Dunkirk and Ostend in the Spanish Netherlands, whose loss would close the sea lanes between Spain and the Army of Flanders. This would make it impossible to continue the war.

Spanish chief minister, Gaspar de Guzmán, Count-Duke of Olivares, responded by doubling the size of the Dunkirk squadron, with a smaller force under Lope de Hoces based in A Coruña. Despite a Dutch blockade, the Spanish transported 6,000 reinforcements to Flanders and prevented an attack on either Dunkirk or Ostend. However, by early August Fuenterrabía had been nearly destroyed by constant bombardment and was close to surrender; although greatly outnumbered, de Hoces was ordered to attack the French blockade and provide time for a relief force to reach the town.

== The battle ==
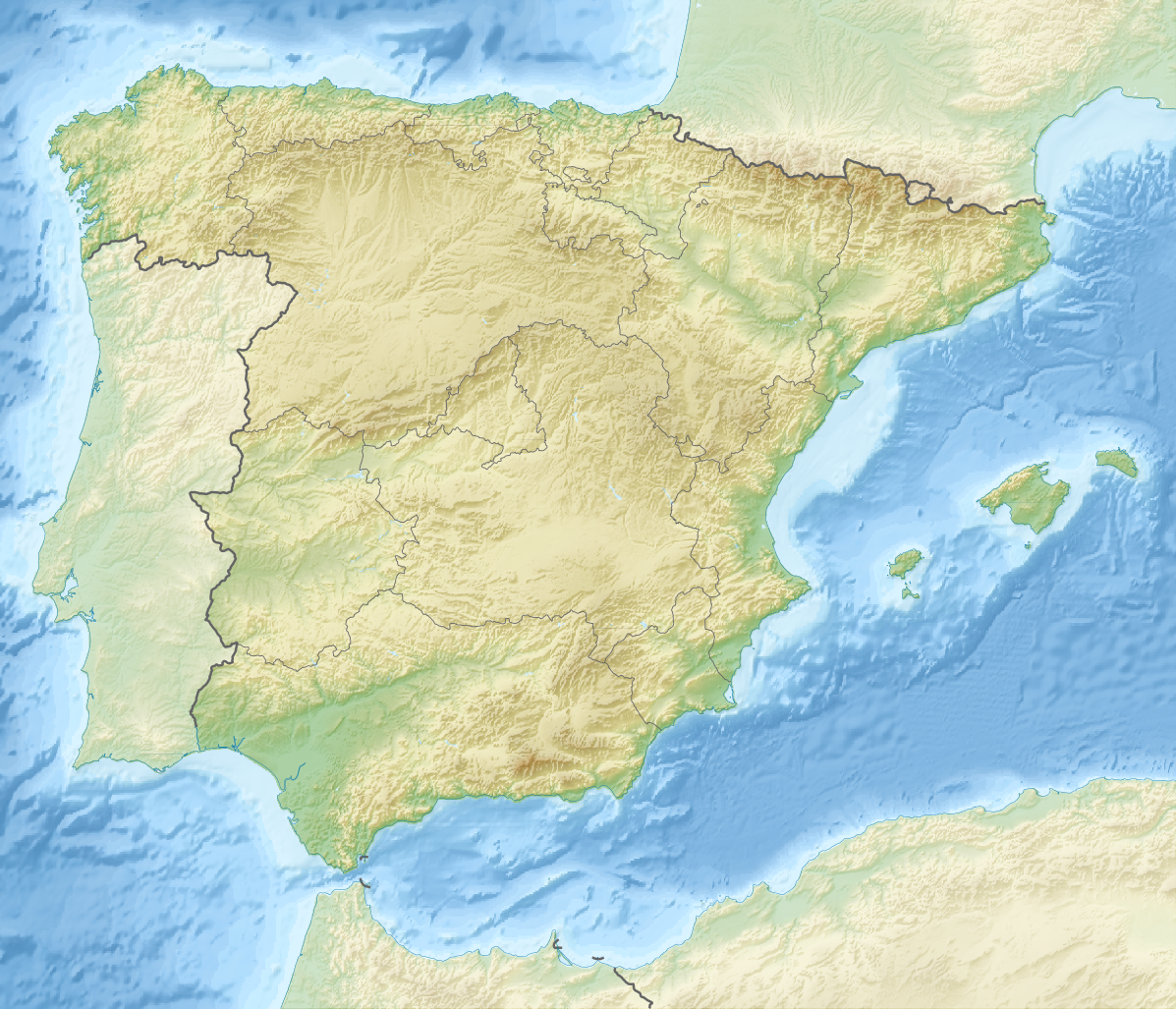
Location map

Sourdis was an aggressive commander, while both he and Richelieu were anxious to enhance the reputation of the French navy by offensive action. He had divided his forces into three elements, leaving the largest portion under Claude de Launay-Razilly to continue the blockade of Fuenterrabía. A second squadron led by Motigny was sent to monitor Hoces, while a third section commanded by Sourdis himself cruised along the coast; in July, he captured four Spanish ships at Pasaia.

Following his orders, Hoces left Coruña with 12 galleons and four smaller vessels and on 17 August entered the harbour of Getaria where he was blockaded by Motigny. This was a strong defensive position, since the shallow waters prevented the larger French ships from entering and adopting their normal tactics of close combat followed by boarding. Hoces strengthened his defences by constructing shore based gun positions, although they were not strong enough to withstand a sustained attack.

Once advised of the situation by Motigny, Sourdis ordered the bulk of his fleet to make for Getaria where they met up on the evening of 19 August. Instead of attacking the Spanish directly, he decided to use fireships and cut off any escape route with his smaller vessels; this meant waiting for the wind to blow towards the shore, which delayed operations until 22nd. He formed his force into three divisions, himself aboard Le Triomphe in the front line, along with seven fireships. Crowded together, the wind against them and the French warships blocking their exit, the Spanish were unable to escape; by the time Sourdis withdrew at 6:00 pm, all their ships except one had been destroyed. Hoces set fire to his ship before abandoning it; Spanish dead were between 3,000 and 4,000, while the French lost 40 dead.

== Consequences ==
The French naval force employed at the 1628 Siege of La Rochelle had consisted of Dutch-built warships, many commanded by foreign mercenaries; the 1638 campaign was the first in which both ships and officers were overwhelmingly French. Victory at Getaria gave Sourdis temporary control of the Bay of Biscay and was treated by Richelieu as a vindication of his naval policy. However, the Spanish lifted the siege of Fuenterrabía on 7 September, and the remnants of the French army were evacuated by sea, leading to recriminations between Sourdis and Condé over responsibility for failure.

== Sources ==
- Byinton, Richard (2011). The Forgotten Service: The French Navy of the Old Regime, 1650-1789 (Thesis). Florida State University.
- Jenkins, Ernest (1973). History of the French Navy. TBS The Book Service Ltd. ISBN 978-0356041964.
- Kamen, Henry (2002). Spain's Road to Empire (2003 ed.). Allen Lane. ISBN 978-0140285284.
- Lacour-Gayet, Georges (1911). La marine militaire de la France sous les règnes de Louis XIII et de Louis XIV, Tome 1, Richelieu, Mazarin, 1624-1661 (in French). Honoré Champion.
- Le Moing, Guy (2011). Les 600 plus grandes batailles navales de l'Histoire (in French). Marines Editions.
- Stradling, Robert (1979). "CATASTROPHE AND RECOVERY: THE DEFEAT OF SPAIN, 1639–43". History. 64 (11): 205–219. doi:10.1111/j.1468-229X.1979.tb02059.x. JSTOR 24411536.
- Vergé-Franceschi, Michel (2002). Dictionnaire d'Histoire Maritime (in French). éditions Robert Laffont.
- Wedgwood, CV (1938). The Thirty Years War (2005 ed.). New York Review of Books. ISBN 978-1590171462.
- Bodart, Gaston (1908). Militär-historisches Kriegs-Lexikon (1618-1905) (in German). Vienna and Leipzig: C. W. Stern.
