= Lope de Hoces =

Spanish admiral (1619-1639)

Lope de Hoces (fl. 1619 – 21 October 1639) was a Spanish admiral who was killed in action at the Battle of the Downs.

== Naval career ==
Nothing is known about his birthplace or youth. He is first mentioned in 1619 as commander of a squadron heading for the Caribbean. In 1621 De Hoces became interim Admiral of the Ocean Fleet, in the absence of Fadrique de Toledo. In 1626 he was fighting against the Dutch in Brazil.

In 1633, Lope de Hoces captured the Dutch controlled island of St. Martin but in 1635 he failed to retake Pernambuco.

After another indecisive sea battle on 19 February 1636, he returned to Spain, where a new Franco-Spanish war had broken out. De Hoces was stationed in La Coruña and launched two raids against the French and Dutch in the English Channel, in which he captured or sank 12 enemy ships. In 1637, a convoy under Lope de Hoces captured 32 enemy ships in the English Channel when returning from the Spanish Netherlands.

In June 1638 a large French army crossed the Pyrenees to besiege Fuenterrabía. The French army was accompanied by a fleet of 44 French warships under Henri de Sourdis. De Hoces was ordered to attack the French fleet but had only 12 ships at his disposal. The Spanish took up defensive positions before the bay of Guetaria. In the following Battle of Guetaria, the Spanish fleet was battered by superior French firepower, and finished off by fireships which burned the entire fleet, except the Santiago. Only 1,000 Spanish survivors reached the shores, including Lope de Hoces.

=== Battle of the Downs ===
In 1639, another large convoy of 75 ships and 24,000 soldiers and sailors was prepared to resupply the Spanish Netherlands. The convoys command was offered to Lope de Hoces, but he turned it down, as a result the command passed to Antonio de Oquendo, commander of the Mediterranean fleet. On 15 September the fleet was intercepted near the Strait of Dover by the squadron of Dutch Lieutenant-Admiral Maarten Tromp, who was reinforced two days later by a flotilla of Vice-Admiral Witte de With. De Oquendo took refuge in The Downs, in neutral English waters at the coast of Kent. On 21 October the Dutch fleet, grown to over a hundred ships, violated English neutrality and attacked the Spanish fleet, succeeding in destroying or capturing many enemy vessels. Lope de Hoces sailed on the Santa Teresa towards the Dutch fleet, but he was killed by two gunshot wounds. The Santa Teresa was set on fire by a fireship and burned with great loss of life.

== Sources ==
- Biografía de Don Lope de Hoces y Córdova
