= Capture of Saint Martin (1633) =

1633 naval battle of the Eighty Years' War

Coordinates: 18.028967°N 63.044733°W

- Part of the Eighty Years' War
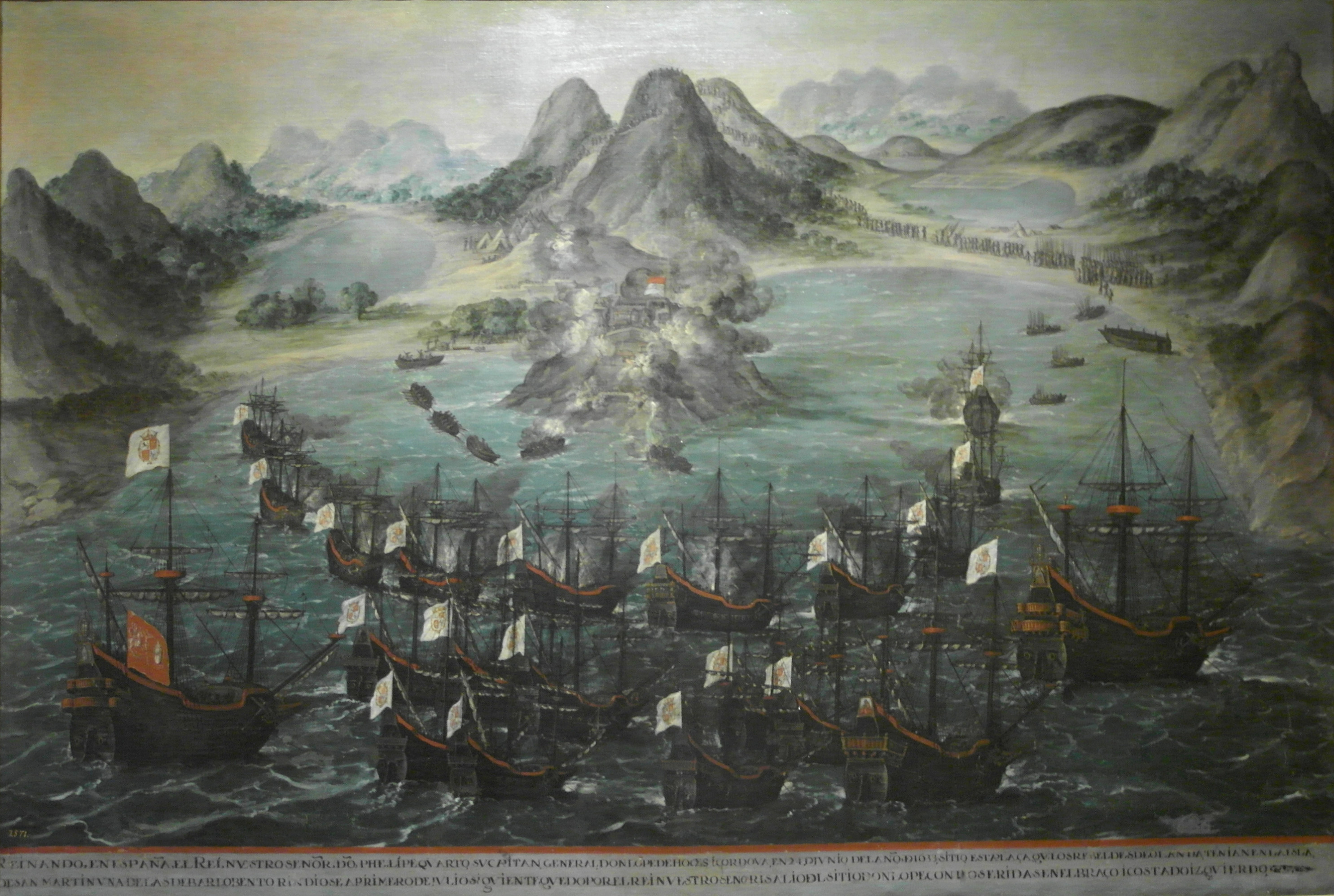
- Spanish capture of Saint Martin by Juan de la Corte (1597-1660), oil on canvas. Naval museum of Madrid
Date	25 June to 1 July 1633
Location	Saint Martin Dutch Antilles, Caribbean Sea
Result	Spanish victory

Belligerents
Dutch Republic	Spain

Commanders and leaders
(Dutch Republic) Jan Claeszoon van Campen (WIA)	(Spain) Lope de Hoces (WIA) (Spain) Marquess of Cadreita

Strength
140	24 men-of-war 31 transports 1300 men

Casualties and losses
3 ships captured 8 killed or wounded	26 killed or wounded

Part of the Eighty Years' War, the Capture of Saint Martin was a Spanish naval expedition against the island of Saint Martin, then occupied by the Dutch Republic. The island, claimed by Spain since Christopher Columbus' second voyage to the West Indies in 1493, lies a few hundred miles east of Puerto Rico. Its capture prevented Dutch privateers using it as a base for operations in the Caribbean.

== Background ==
The Dutch Republic had been fighting Spain for its independence since the outbreak of the Eighty Years War in 1568, a conflict which extended into the Spanish Americas. By the 1620s, the Spanish were increasingly concerned by Dutch, French and English incursions into the Caribbean, culminating in the Battle in the Bay of Matanzas in 1628, when the Dutch captured the annual Spanish treasure fleet.

The Spanish now decided to take action and targeted the Dutch garrison on Saint Martin, which threatened their colony in Puerto Rico. In April 1633, a fleet was sent from Cádiz to expel them, commanded by the Marquess of Cadreita, with the experienced Lope de Hoces as his deputy.

== Battle ==
Modern map of Saint Martin

As the Spanish approached the island on 24 June, reconnaissance showed the Dutch had constructed a 22-gun fortress covering Sint Maarten's approaches, held by a garrison of around 140, which included 40 slaves. Cadreita sent an emissary ashore from the Spanish flagship Nuestra Señora de Aranzazu, to demand the garrison's surrender but although courteously received, their commander van Campen rejected the offer.

The Spanish ships now began bombarding the fort, allowing them to disembark troops, although seven sailors died in the process. By 2:00 A.M on 25th, 1,000 troops were ashore but the thick undergrowth meant they did not reach the fort until the next day, while suffering a number of deaths from heat exhaustion. Although de Hoces was badly wounded in one of the first exchanges of fire, the Spanish landed four heavier guns which began firing on the fort from close range.

Since Cadreita was instructed not to spend more than ten days taking the island, the Spanish launched an assault on the night of 30 June. The attack cost them three dead and eighteen wounded, including veteran naval captain Tiburcio Redín. However, van Campen was also injured in the assault and asked for terms of surrender the next day; Cadreita ignored orders to put the garrison to the sword and agreed to take them to the nearest Dutch possession.

== Aftermath ==
Cadreita occupied the fortress the next day, strengthening its defenses by adding four 24-pounders, four 18-pound demi-culverins, and five 12-to ten-pounders to its armament, plus a permanent garrison of 250 Spanish soldiers and 50 auxiliaries under Captain Cebrián de Lizarazu. The fleet then sailed to San Juan de Puerto Rico, arriving with its prisoners and three Dutch prize ships on 13 July. The Spaniards allowed all inhabitants to leave, hoisted the Spanish flag and read a Holy mass of Gratitude in the fort.

The island was returned to the Dutch Republic by the Peace of Westphalia in 1648.

== Sources ==
- Lane, E Kris. Pillaging the Empire: Piracy in the Americas 1500-1750. M.E. Sharpe Publishers, ISBN 0-7656-0257-1
- Mathews, Thomas (1969). "The Spanish Domination of Saint Martin (1633-1648)". Caribbean Studies. 9 (1): 3–23. JSTOR 25612105.
- Marley, David F (1998). Wars of the Americas: A Chronology of Armed Conflict in the New World, 1492 to the Present. ABC-CLIO. ISBN 0-87436-837-5.
- Dewald, Jonathan (2003). Europe 1450 to 1789: Encyclopedia of the Early Modern World. Charles Scribner's Sons. ISBN 0-684-31200-X.
- Hartog, Johannes History of Sint Maarten and Saint Martin
