= Battle of the Downs =

1639 battle of the Eighty Years' War

Coordinates: 51°12′N 1°30′E

- Part of the Eighty Years' War and the Thirty Years' War
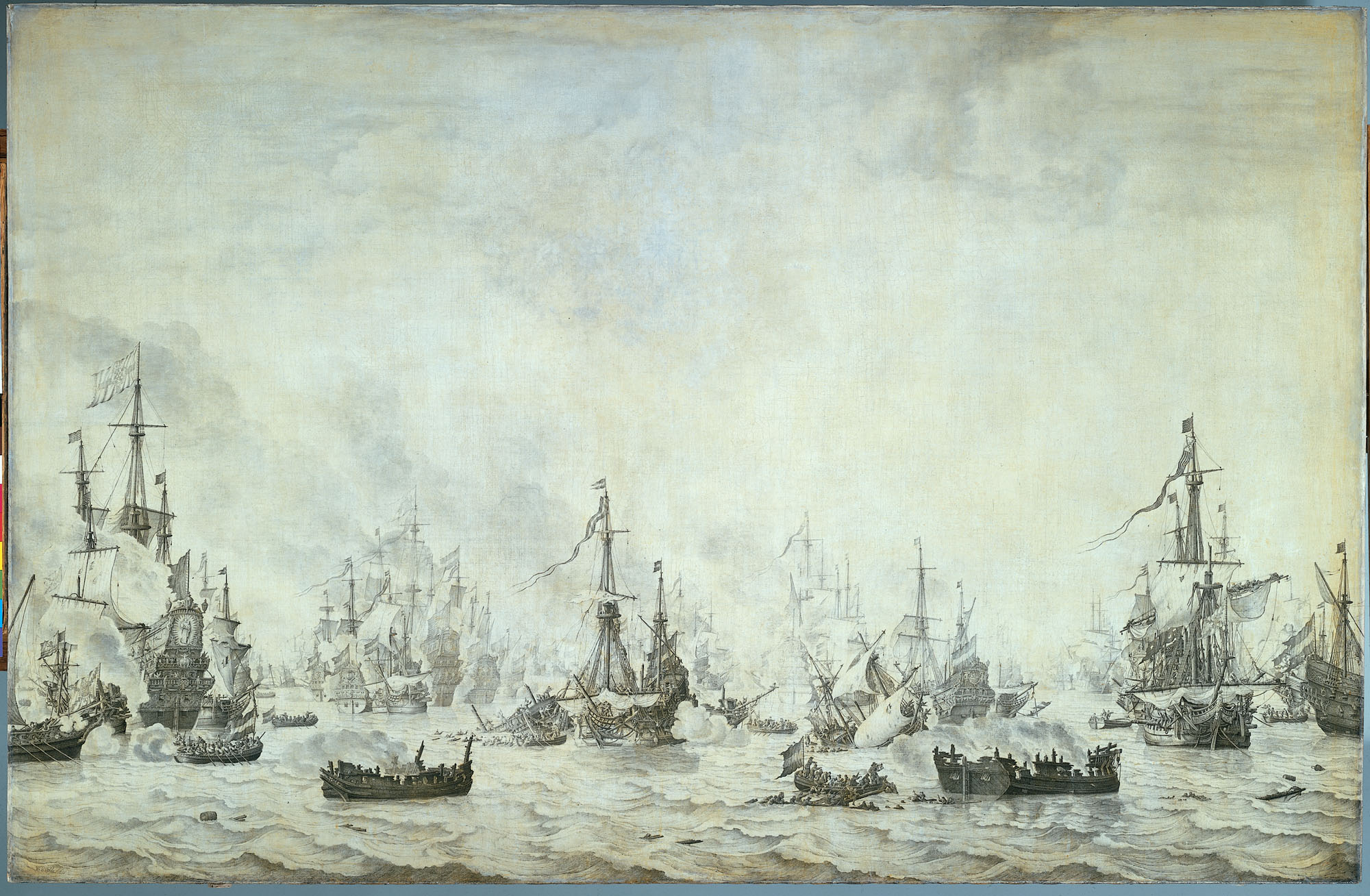
- 1659 engraving of the battle
Date	21 October 1639
Location	Near The Downs, English Channel
Result	Dutch victory

Belligerents
Spain; Portugal (Note: Portugal was part of a dynastic union with Spain until 1640.)	Dutch Republic

Commanders and leaders
(Spain) Antonio de Oquendo (Spain) Lope de Hoces † (Spain) Miguel de Horna	(Dutch Republic) Maarten Tromp (Dutch Republic) Witte de With (Dutch Republic) Joost Banckert (Dutch Republic) Johan Evertsen

Strength
22 galleys, 29 galleons, 13 frigates, 6,500 sailors, 8,000 marines, 30 transports carrying 9,000 soldiers (Note: Spanish Order of Battle; Santiago 60 (Castile) – flagship; reached Dunkirk 22 October San Antonio (pinnace) (Masibradi) – Driven ashore 21 October San Agustin (pinnace) (Martin Ladron de Guevara) – Driven ashore 21 October Santa Teresa 60 (Portugal) – Don Lope de Hoces, commander. Destroyed in action 21 October San Jeronimo San Agustin (Naples) – Vice-Admiral. Driven ashore 21 October, sunk 3 or 4 days later El Gran Alejandro (Martin Ladron de Guevara) – Taken by the Dutch Santa Ana (Portugal) San Sebastian Santa Catalina (Guipuzcoa) – Driven ashore 21 October San Lazaro San Blas (Masibradi) – Driven ashore 21 October San Jerónimo (Masibradi) – Burnt in the Downs 21 October San Nicolas Santiago (Castile) – Burnt off Dover on the night of 23 October San Juan Bautista (Guipuzcoa) – Sunk 21 October Esquevel 16 (hired Dane) – Captured 28 September San Jose (Dunkirk) Los Angeles (Castile) – Driven ashore 21 October Santiago (Portugal) – Driven ashore 21 October Delfin Dorado (Naples) – Driven ashore 21 October San Antonio (Naples) – Driven ashore 21 October San Juan Evangelista (Dunkirk) El Pingue (hired ship) – Sunk in the Downs 21 October San Carlos (Masibradi) San Nicolas (Masibradi) San Miguel Orfeo 44 (Naples) – Lost on the Goodwin sands 21 October San Vicente Ferrer (Dunkerque) San Martin (Dunkerque) Nuestra Senora de Monteagudo (Dunkerque) – Escaped into Dunkirk 22 October Santiago 60? (Galicia) – Captured 21 October ? (flag of Masibradi) – Captured 28 September, retaken same day, escaped to Dunkirk, 22 October, wrecked ?26 October Santo Tomas (Martin Ladron de Guevara) – Driven ashore 21 October Nuestra Senora de Luz Santa Clara San Gedeon (Dunkerque) San Jacinto San Carlos (Dunkerque) – Sunk 21 October Santo Cristo de Burgos (San Josef) – Lost off the French coast 21 October San Paulo (Masibradi) San Miguel La Corona (hired ship) La Presa or San Pablo La Presa (Castile) San Esteban (Martin Ladron de Guevara) – Captured 21 October San Pedro de la Fortuna (hired ship) – Driven ashore but got off, 21 October Los Angeles (hired ship) Aguila Imperial La Mujer Santo Domingo de Polonia (hired Polish ship) – Driven ashore 21 October San Jose (flagship of Vizcaya) – Captured 21 October San Salvador (flagship of Dunkirk) – Escaped into Dunkirk 22 October São Baltasar (Vice-Admiral of Portugal) – 800 tons. Back at Lisbon in 1640 San Francisco 50? (Rear-Admiral of Dunkerque) – Escaped into Dunkirk 22 October San Pedro el Grande (flagship of Ladron de Guevara) Santiago (Martin Ladron de Guevara) Jesus Maria (pinnace) San Pedro Martir (urca) (hired ship) – Driven ashore 21 October Fama (Urca) (hired ship) – Driven ashore 21 October Santa Cruz (Masibradi) San Daniel (Guipuzcoa) – Driven ashore 21 October San Juan Evangelista (hired ship of Hamburg) – Driven ashore 21 October Santa Agnes (frigate) (Naples) – Stranded but got off, 24 October Grune? (Castile) – Driven ashore, 21 October 1639 Santa Teresa (Saetia) (Castile) – Taken by a French privateer 21 October Hired English transports; Exchange, Peregrine, Assurance plus five others; all 8 English transports put into Plymouth on 13 September, and reached the Downs 22 October, where they were detained)	95 warships (Note: Dutch Order of Battle; incomplete, since contemporaneous Dutch sources only list participating captains and in many cases it is unknown which ship they commanded 26 September: Aemilia 57 (Tromp, flag captain Barend Barendsz Cramer) Rotterdam Frederik Hendrik 36 (Pieter Pietersz de Wint) Amsterdam; on 21 October this was Witte de With's flagship Hollandsche Tuyn 32 (Lambert IJsbrandszoon Halfhoorn) Northern Quarter (Noorderkwartier) Salamander 40 (Laurens Pietersz Backhuysen) – WIC ship Gelderland 34 (Willem van Colster) Rotterdam Sampson 32 (Claes Cornelisz Ham) Noorderkwartier Omlandia 28 (Jan Gerbrandszoon) Frisia Groot Christoffel 28 (hired by Noorderkwartier admiralty, Frederick Pieterszoon) – blew up on 26 September Deventer 28 (Robert Post) Amsterdam Gideon 24 (Hendrick Jansz Kamp) Frisia Meerminne 28 (Jan Pauluszoon) Zealand Veere 32 (Cornelis Ringelszoon) Zealand Reinforcements 27 September: Maeght van Dordrecht 42 (Vice-Admiral Witte de With) Rotterdam Overijssel 24 (Jacques Forant) Amsterdam Utrecht 30 (Gerrit Meyndertsz den Uyl) Amsterdam Sint Laurens 32 (A.Dommertszoon) Bommel 28 (Sybrant Barentsz Waterdrincker) Amsterdam Reinforcements 28 September: Banckert squadron: 't Wapen van Zeeland 28 (Vice-Admiral Joost Banckert) Zealand Zeeridder 34 (Frans Jansz van Vlissingen) Zealand Zutphen 28 (Joris van Cats) Amsterdam Walcheren 28 (Jan Theunisz Sluis) Amsterdam 't Wapen van Holland 39 (Lieven Cornelisz de Zeeuw) Noorderkwartier Neptunis 33 (Albert 't Jongen Hoen) Noorderkwartier Amsterdam 10 (Pieter Barentsz Dorrevelt) Amsterdam Drenthe 16 (Gerrit Veen) Amsterdam Rotterdam 10 (Joris Pietersz van den Broecke) Frisia Arnemuyden 22 (Adriaen Jansz de Gloeyende Oven) Zealand Ter Goes 24 (Abraham Crijnssen) Zealand Friesland 22 (Tjaert de Groot) Frisia After reinforcements 30 September Evertsen squadron: Vlissingen 34 (Vice-Admiral Johan Evertsen, flag captain Frans Jansen) Zeeland De With squadron: thirty ships, four fireships Jol squadron, seven ships: Jupiter (Cornelis Cornelisz Jol "Houtebeen") WIC De Nijs squadron, eight ships)

Casualties and losses
35–40 ships 5,000 sailors or marines 3,000 soldiers captured or interned in England	100–1,000 men 1–10 ships lost

The Battle of the Downs, 21 October 1639, took place during the Eighty Years' War. A Spanish fleet commanded by Antonio de Oquendo was defeated by a Dutch force under Maarten Tromp, a victory that ended Spanish attempts to regain local naval superiority.

The battle was initiated when Spanish chief minister Olivares sent a large convoy of troops and supplies for the Army of Flanders, escorted by some 50 warships. Since 1621, Spanish naval activity in the Channel had focused on avoiding direct conflict with the superior Dutch fleet, while attacking their merchant ships from privateering bases in Dunkirk and Ostend. In a change from this policy, Oquendo was ordered to deliver the reinforcements but also bring the Dutch to battle; Olivares hoped victory would reassert Spanish naval dominance in northern European waters, restore Spanish prestige and force the Dutch States General to negotiate peace terms.

The Spanish entered the Channel on 11 September and were intercepted by the Dutch in actions between 16 and 18 September. Losses on both sides were minimal, but Oquendo took refuge in The Downs, an anchorage between the ports of Dover and Deal, where he was protected by English neutrality. Although blockaded here by the Dutch fleet, most of the reinforcements were transported to Dunkirk via small, fast frigates.

On 21 October, the Dutch entered the Downs and attacked the Spanish fleet with fireships. Unable to manoeuvre in the cramped waters and with the wind against them, the Spanish lost around ten ships captured or destroyed, while another twelve deliberately ran themselves ashore to avoid capture. Combined with the Action of 12–17 January 1640 the repulse of a similar-sized expedition against Dutch Brazil in January 1640, this marked the end of attempts to challenge Dutch maritime supremacy and an acceptance by the Spanish court that the war could not be won.

== Background ==
When the Franco-Spanish War began in 1635, Spain was already engaged in the Eighty Years War with the Dutch Republic, as well as supporting Emperor Ferdinand II in the Thirty Years War. Although the Spanish Empire had far greater resources than any of its opponents, fighting on multiple fronts forced them to rely on long and vulnerable lines of communication. The most important was the Spanish Road, an overland route funnelling troops and supplies from their possessions in Italy to the Army of Flanders. This was crucial for the war in the Netherlands since Dutch naval superiority made it difficult to send these by sea.

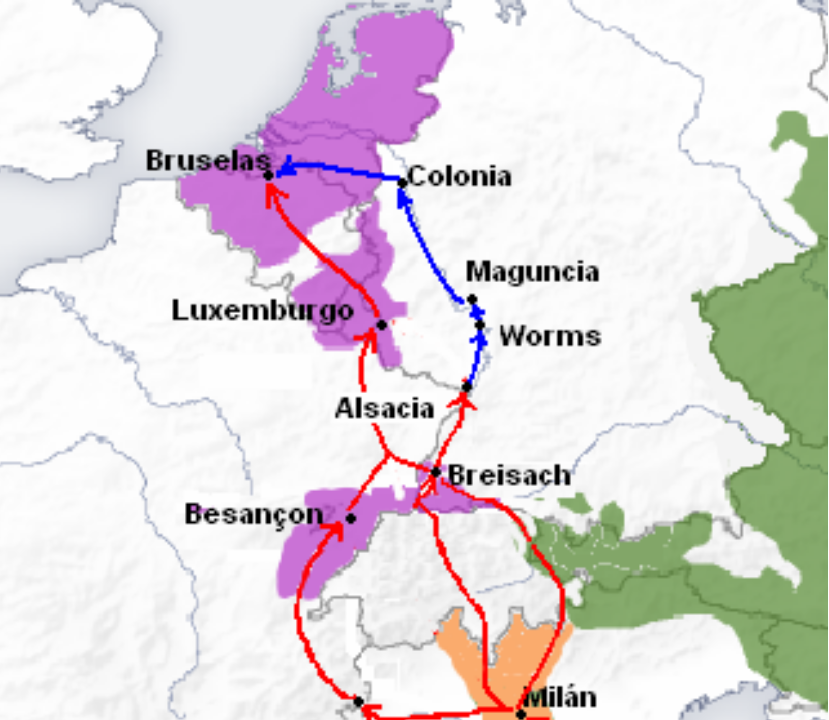
The Spanish Road; routes in Red and Blue Magenta: Areas controlled by Spain Green: Areas controlled by Austria Orange: Duchy of Milan(ruled by Spain)

In December 1638, a French-backed army under Bernard of Saxe-Weimar captured Breisach in Alsace, severing the Spanish Road (see map). However, the Spanish defeated Dutch attacks on Dunkirk and Ostend in the Spanish Netherlands, and despite a French naval victory at Getaria in August, forced them to retreat from Fuenterrabía. This encouraged chief minister Olivares to reassert Spanish naval prestige by sending a large convoy to reinforce Flanders. Stripping 22 galleys from the Mediterranean, combined with a hurried construction program, meant that by August 1639 Olivares had assembled a fleet of around 50 warships along with a number of smaller vessels, manned by 6,500 sailors and 8,000 marines.

In addition, 9,000 reinforcements and three million escudos for the Army of Flanders were carried in 30 transports, which included ships chartered from Germany and England, contracted under an agreement with Charles I. Dating back to the early 1630s and known as the "English Road", this took advantage of English neutrality to ship supplies and men to Dover, where they transferred to small, fast vessels for the trip across the English Channel to Dunkirk. In May, a flotilla of nine ships used this route to transport 1,500 men to Flanders, one of many similar transfers that took place over the years.

Since 1621, the Spanish had avoided major conflict with the Dutch fleet in favour of raids conducted by the Dunkirk-based Armada de Flandes and local privateers on their commercial shipping, their efforts peaking under admiral Francisco de Ribera. In October 1637, Lope de Hoces, commander of the Armada de Coruña, transported 5,000 men from A Coruña to Dunkirk, then captured over 20 Dutch merchant ships on his return voyage. Now confident enough to seek a full-scale battle, Olivares offered him command of the expedition, but de Hoces was sceptical of his own ability to defeat the Dutch, especially given that the galleys which formed a significant part of his force were far less effective in the Channel. He refused the position, which passed instead to Antonio de Oquendo, admiral in the Mediterranean. Olivares expected the Dutch would try to prevent delivery of the reinforcements, giving Oquendo the opportunity to bring them to battle.

Advised of these movements, the States General began preparing the main Dutch fleet for action. While this was being done, a squadron led by Maarten Tromp was ordered to sea to monitor and harass the Spanish if needed, although he was forbidden from engaging them in battle until joined by the rest of the fleet, some fifty vessels under Johan Evertsen. Tromp divided his force into three; 12 ships under Joost Banckert (Note: Middelburg (30); Vlissingen (34); Zutphen (28); Walcheren (28); Wapen van Nassau (38); Neptunus (28); Amsterdam (10); Drente (10); Rotterdam (10); Arnemuyden (22); Ter Goes (24); Friesland (22)) were positioned north of the Downs, in the unlikely event the Spanish took the long route around the British Isles. Five ships under Witte de With (Note: Maagd van Dordrecht (42); Overijssel (24); Utrecht (30); Sint Laurens (32); Bommel (30);) patrolled the English side of the Channel, while the remaining 12 under Tromp (Note: Aemilia (57); Gelderland (32); Frederik Hendrik (36); Sampson (36); Hollandsche Tuin (32); Deventer (28); Omlandia (28); Veere (32); Salamander (40); Groote Christoffel (30); Gideon (24); Meermin (28)) monitored the French coast.

== Prelude ==
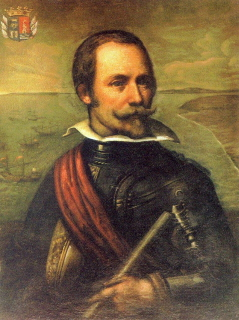
Spanish commander Antonio de Oquendo

Attempts by the French admiral Henri de Sourdis to disrupt Spanish preparations failed and the fleet sailed on 27 August, entering the Channel on 11 September. Ships of different squadrons were mixed through the formation, an attempt to ensure smaller ships would be supported by larger ones. The vanguard was composed of thirteen ships from the Armada de Flandes under Miguel de Horna, since they had the most experience in these waters; De Horna himself accompanied Oquendo on board his flagship.

On 15 September, they learned from a passing English ship that a Dutch squadron was anchored near Calais and the next day made contact with Tromp. Following his instructions, Oquendo adopted a half-moon formation, placing his flagship on the right flank; despite being outnumbered, Tromp placed his squadron into line of battle and attacked. During the Fight in the Channel Oquendo used the same tactics employed in his 1631 victory at Abrolhos, where he had destroyed the Dutch flagship in a single ship to ship battle. He failed to issue adequate instructions to his subordinates and negated his superior numbers by constantly seeking to engage Tromp's flagship. This manoeuver, however, was effected without warning the rest of the Spanish fleet. Some of the ships near Oquendo turned with him, others were confused and maintained bearing. The half-moon formation quickly disintegrated, and only the Dunkirk squadron and the galleon San Juan kept up with the Spanish flagship's pursuit of Tromp.

Had Oquendo given the order for a line, the immense Spanish fleet could have probably encircled and dispatched the Dutch squadron in a few hours. However, Oquendo seemed intent on boarding the Dutch flagship. When he finally decided to turn for a shot, he did it too late and sailed past Tromp's stern. Trying to correct his error, Oquendo attempted to board the second ship in the Dutch column. The latter also avoided him. Oquendo's flagship and one of the Dunkirk ships, the Santiago, were now downwind and on the receiving end of the cannonades of the remaining nine ships of the Dutch column. Tromp turned his column and went for another round on the Santiago. Oquendo, the other six Dunkirk ships and the San Juan, unable to turn upwind, fired as they could. The artillery did little damage, but Spanish musketry picked off many on the Dutch decks.

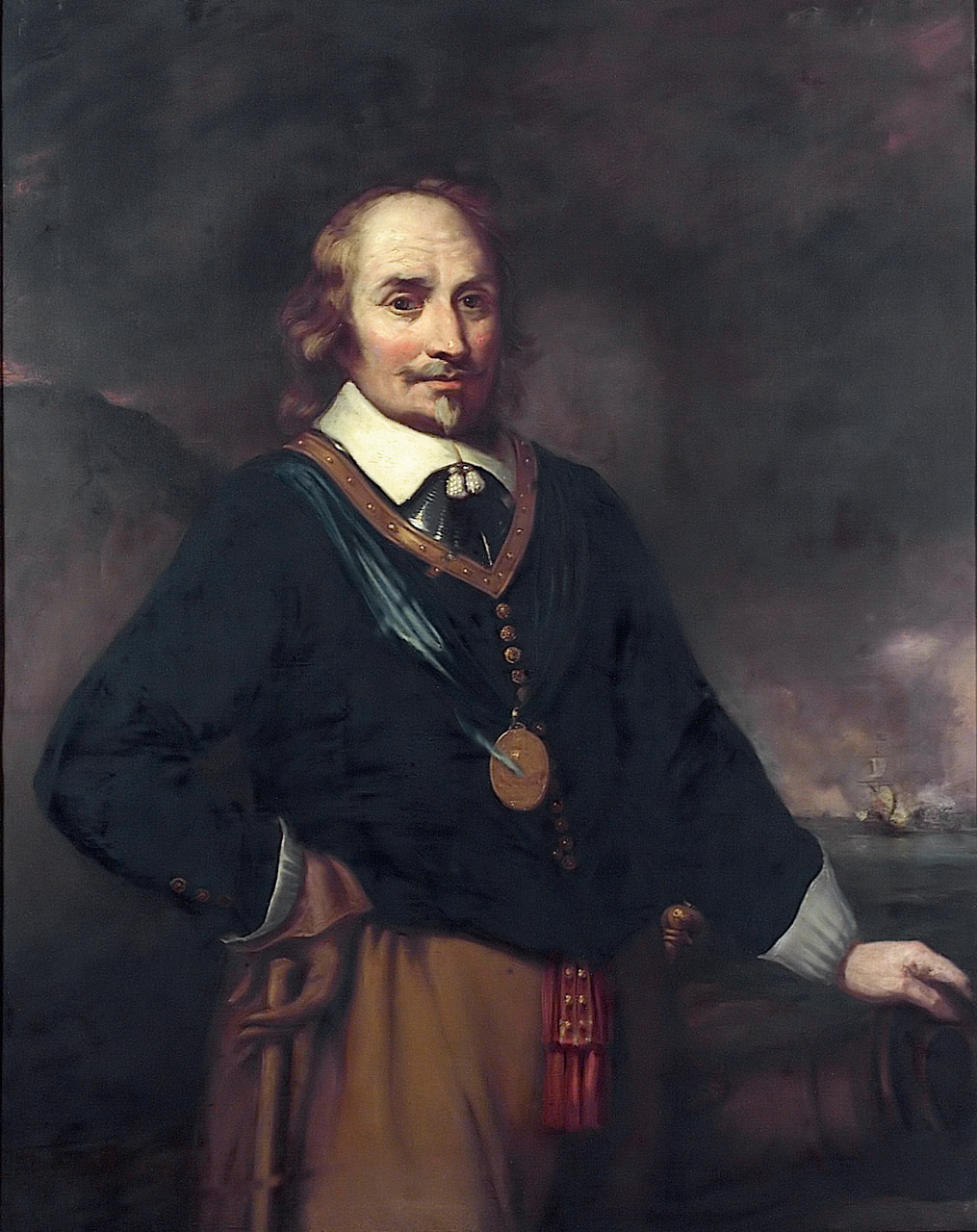
Dutch commander Maarten Tromp

This encounter lasted for three hours, in the course of which the Dutch ship Groot Christoffel accidentally exploded. By noon, the six ships of the Witte de With column had reached Tromp, and increased his number to 16. Although the rest of the Spanish fleet remained dispersed and disorganized, many units had finally turned and were also approaching from the other side. For Tromp, this was building up into a dangerous situation, as the Spanish units upwind would cut off his exit, and force the Dutch squadron to turn into the shoals of the bay of Boulogne and almost certainly run aground. However, at this moment, Oquendo ordered the Spanish fleet to resume a half-moon formation. The Spanish ships turned, allowing Tromp's squadron to turn also, gain the wind, and escape the danger.

There were no more engagements that evening. The fleets anchored in, and the next day, rear-admiral Joost Banckert arrived, bringing the total Dutch fleet to thirty-two. But there was no engagement, just preparations for what was to become known as the Battle of the Downs.

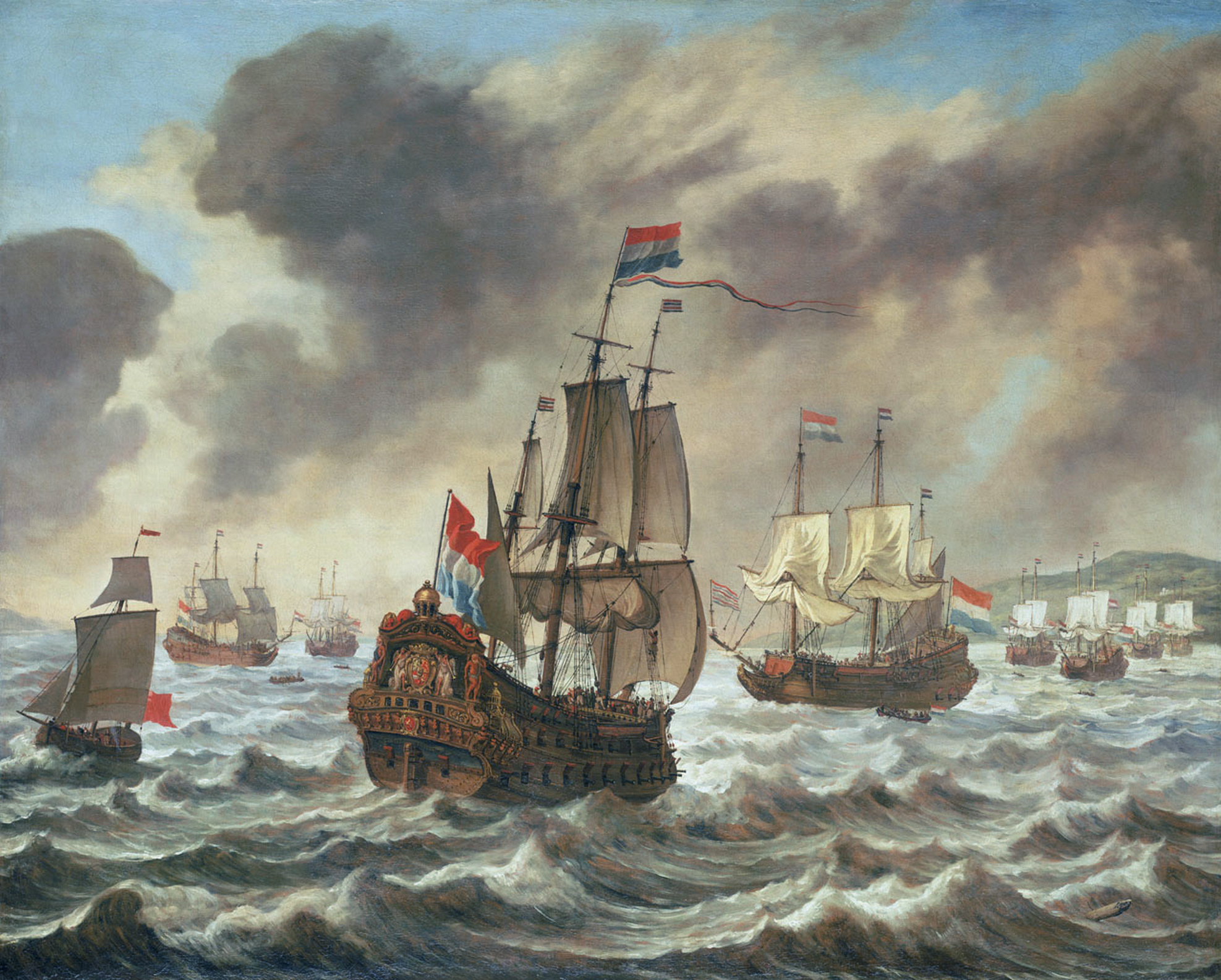
c. 1639 painting of the Dutch blockade off the English coast before the battle

The Spanish, whose priority was to protect the troops, not to endanger them by continuing the battle, took refuge in The Downs, an anchorage between the English ports of Dover and Deal, near an English squadron commanded by Vice-Admiral John Pennington. Ocquendo ordered 13 of his Dunkirker squadron, composed of light, fast frigates, to head north at night round the Goodwin Sands; although the Dutch later sealed this exit, they arrived in Dunkirk with 3,000 troops and all the bullion intended to pay the Army of Flanders. Ultimately, the Spanish calculated 6,000 troops had been landed, with 1,500 captured by the Dutch and another 1,500 either killed or interned in England, which allowed Ocquendo to later claim he had largely achieved the objectives set.

On the evening of 28 September, Tromp and De With withdrew to resupply, for they were short of gunpowder. They feared they had failed in their mission until they rediscovered the Spanish at the Downs on the 30th. Together, they blockaded the Spanish and sent urgently to the Netherlands for reinforcements. The five Dutch admiralties hired any large armed merchant ship they could find. Many joined voluntarily, hoping for a rich bounty. By the end of October, Tromp had 95 ships and 12 fire ships.

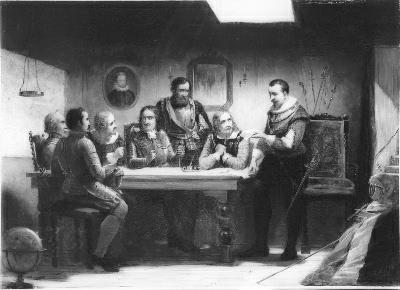
The Dutch council of war decides at Tromp's suggestion to supply the Spanish with gunpowder

Meanwhile, the Spanish, who earlier had managed to sneak 13 or 14 Dunkirker frigates through the blockade, began to transport their troops and money to Flanders on British ships under an English flag. Tromp stopped this by searching the English vessels and detaining any Spanish troops he found. Uneasy about the possible English reaction to this, he pretended to Pennington to be worried by his secret orders from the States-General. He showed him, "confidentially", a missive commanding him to attack the Spanish armada wherever it might be located and to prevent by force of arms any interference by a third power.

Meanwhile, Tromp's patience was tested to the limit. His war council would not yet agree to an attack while the Spaniards claimed they did not have enough gunpowder to sail out. This prompted a remarkable offer from the Dutch. On 13 October, two captains on behalf of Tromp reported to Pennington that they were willing to supply the Spanish fleet with 500 barrels of gunpowder on the condition that the fleet would then immediately sail out to battle. Oquendo did not accept the offer, but conflict almost broke out anyway on the 14th when a Spanish marksman shot dead a sailor on a Dutch ship. According to Oquendo, the gunman was an incredibly stupid peasant who would be severely punished. Still, in the following days, Oquendo and Tromp both began to prepare for battle, while Pennington was given permission to withdraw in case of a battle.

== Battle ==
Tromp on his flagship just before the battle

On 21 October, an easterly wind giving him the weather gage, Tromp detached 30 ships under De With to prevent any interference from Pennington, while two squadrons commanded by Cornelis Jol and Jan Hendriksz de Nijs blocked escape routes to the north and south respectively. He then attacked with the remainder, which included a number of fireships. Some of the large, unmanoeuverable Spanish ships panicked on approach of the Dutch fleet and grounded themselves deliberately; they were immediately plundered by the English populace, present in great numbers to watch the uncommon spectacle. Others tried a planned breakthrough.

De Oquendo's royal flagship, the Santiago, came out first followed by the Santa Teresa, the Portuguese flagship. Five blazing fireships were sent into the Spanish ships. The first Spanish ship could disengage and avoid three of the fireships at the last moment, but these hit the following Santa Teresa, who had just managed to repel the attack of the other two. Too big (the biggest ship in the Spanish/Portuguese fleet) and slow to manoeuvre, and with no time to react, the Santa Teresa was finally grappled and set on fire by one fire ship. With Admiral Lope de Hoces already dead from his wounds, she fiercely burned with great loss of life.

The Portuguese ships were intercepted by the squadron of the Zeelandic Vice-Admiral Johan Evertsen who launched his fireships against them: most Portuguese ships were taken or destroyed, leaving according to some reports 15,200 dead and 1,800 prisoner. The number of dead is today considered as greatly exaggerated; for example, it does not take into account that a third of the troops had already reached Flanders. De Oquendo managed to escape in the fog with about ten ships, most of them Dunkirkers, and reach Dunkirk. Nine of the ships driven ashore during the battle could be later refloated and also reached Dunkirk.

== Casualties ==
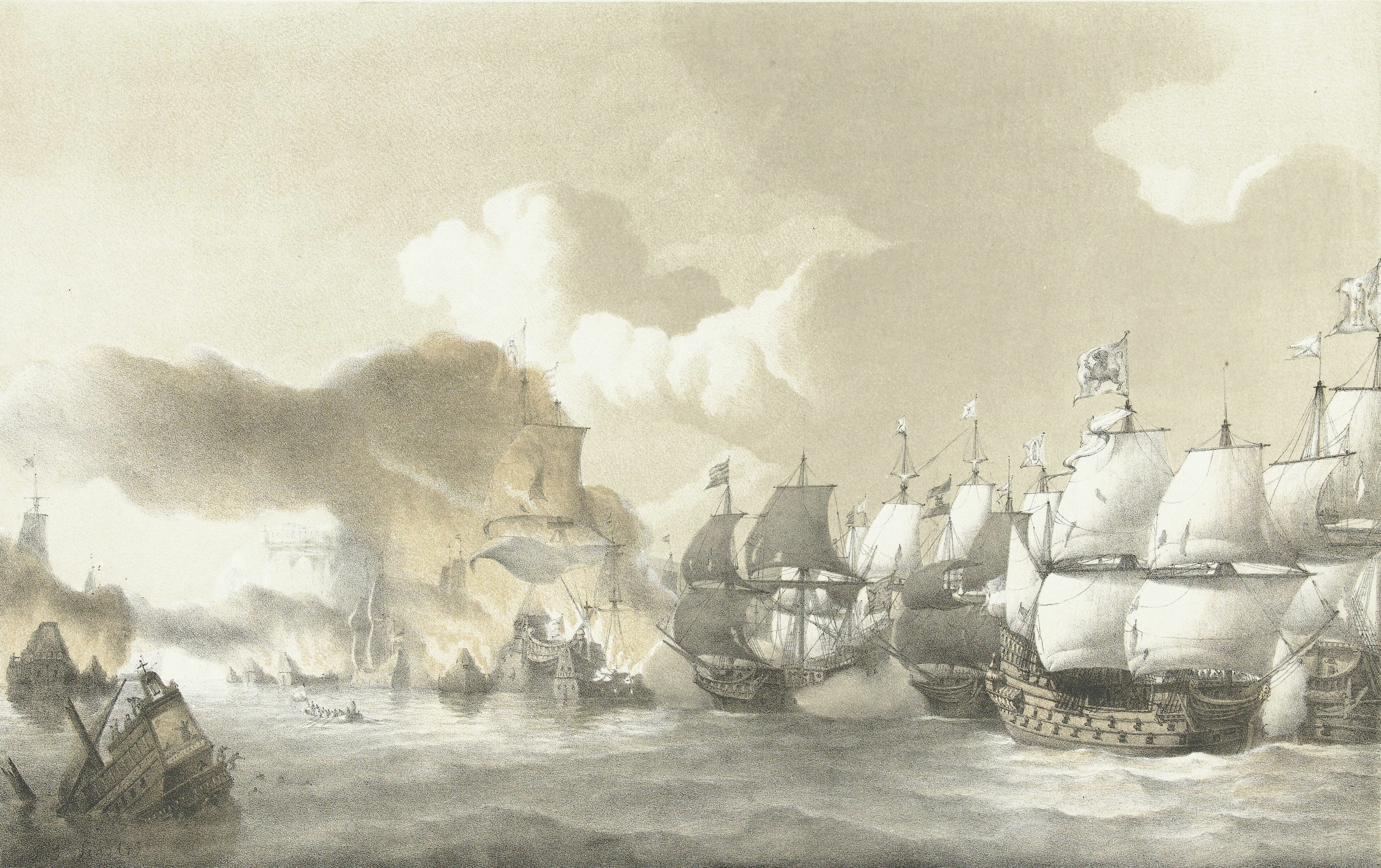
1848–1855 illustration of the battle

According to the Spanish naval historian Cesáreo Fernández Duro, of the 38 ships that attempted to break the Dutch blockade, twelve beached themselves on the English shore, nine of which were later refloated and managed to reach Dunkirk. One was destroyed by a fireship and another nine captured, three being so badly damaged they sank before reaching port; another three were wrecked on the coasts of France or Flanders while trying to avoid capture.

The French diplomat Comte d'Estrades, in a letter to Cardinal Richelieu, claimed that the Spanish had lost thirteen ships burnt or sunk, sixteen captured with 4,000 prisoners, and lost fourteen off the coasts of France and Flanders, a figure higher than the number of Spanish ships present at the Downs. D'Estrades also reported in his letter that the Dutch had lost ten ships sunk or burnt. This source is cited by Jean Le Clerc in his Histoire des Provinces-Unies des Pays-Bas.

The Portuguese Admiral and historian Ignacio Costa Quintella gives figures of 43 ships and 6,000 men lost by the Spanish and some ships and more than 1,000 men by the Dutch. The Dutch sources only mention the loss of one Dutch ship that got entangled with the Santa Teresa and about a hundred persons dead. Historian M.G de Boer's extensively researched book about the subject agrees with this and puts Spanish losses in ships and men at about 40 and 7,000 respectively.

== Aftermath ==
The larger part of the Spanish infantry managed to reach Flanders along with nearly all the money, but the heavy Spanish defeat was significant. Much of the Spanish fleet, which had been built up over several years, was destroyed, and of the ships that succeeded in breaking through the blockade, many were severely damaged. A few months later, another large Spanish expedition, this time headed for Dutch Brazil, was also defeated. Already overstretched by its commitments in the Thirty Years' War and its naval operations against France in the Mediterranean, Spain was in no position to reassert its dominance in northern European waters. The two major naval defeats also had consequences for the Spanish on the Iberian mainland, where they contributed to the climate in which the Portuguese decided to revolt against the Spanish king.

The Dunkirker privateers continued to harm Dutch trade from the Flemish ports, although Dunkirk itself was captured by a Franco-Dutch force in 1646. However, the continuation of Dutch naval dominance in the North Sea meant that Spanish convoys paid a heavy price in lives and ships in running the Dutch blockades. These complicated operations in the Low Countries had left the overall Spanish Habsburg forces and finances in a precarious situation. The Dutch, English, and French were quick to take advantage by seizing some small Spanish island possessions in the Caribbean. But by far the worst effects for Spain were the increased difficulties it suffered in maintaining its position in the Southern Netherlands.

Tromp was hailed as a hero on his return and was rewarded with 10,000 guldens, invoking the jealousy of De With who only got 1,000. De With wrote some anonymous pamphlets painting Tromp as avaricious and himself as the real hero of the battle. With Spain gradually losing its dominant naval position, England weak, and France not yet in possession of a strong navy, the Dutch allowed their own navy to diminish greatly after a peace treaty was signed in 1648. So, with an ineffective naval administration and ships that were too light and too few in number, they were to find themselves at a serious disadvantage in their coming conflicts with the English. However, they were able to maintain their large mercantile advantage over other European powers, entering into a period of increasing Dutch maritime superiority, both mercantile and naval, from the Second Anglo-Dutch War, until the onset of the 18th century.

== Sources ==
- De Boer, Dr MG (1941). Tromp en de armada van 1639 (in Dutch).
- Duro, Cesáreo Fernández (1898). Armada Española desde la unión de los reinos de Castilla y Aragón (in Spanish). Vol. IV. Est. tipográfico Sucesores de Rivadeneyra.
- Godefroi Louis Estrades (comte d'), Charles Colbert de Croissy (marquis), Jean-Antoine de Mesmes Avaux (comte d') (1743). Lettres, memoires et négociations de Monsieur le comte d'Estrades: tant en qualité d'ambassadeur de S. M. T. C. en Italie, en Angleterre & en Hollande, que comme ambassadeur plénipotentiaire à la paix de Nimegue, conjointement avec Messieurs Colbert & comte d'Avaux. Vol. 1. J. Nourse.
- Jean Le Clerc (1728). Histoire des Provinces-Unies des Pays-Bas, depuis la naissance de la République jusqu'à la Paix d'Utrecht & le Traité de la Barrière en 1716. Avec les principales médailles et leur explication. Vol. 2. L'Honoré et Chatelain.
- Ignacio da Costa Quintella (1839). Annaes da marinha portugueza. Acad. das sci. de Lisboa.
- Edmundson, George (January 1890). "Frederick Henry, Prince of Orange". The English Historical Review. 5 (17). Oxford University Press: 41–64. JSTOR 546555.
- R. B Prud'homme van Reine (2001). Schittering en schandaal – Biografie van Maerten en Cornelis Tromp. Arbeiderspers.
- Stradling, Robert (1979). "Catastrophe and Recovery: The Defeat of Spain, 1639–43". History. 64 (11): 205–219. doi:10.1111/j.1468-229X.1979.tb02059.x. JSTOR 24411536.
- Stradling, Robert (1992). The Armada of Flanders: Spanish Maritime Policy and European War, 1568-1668. CUP. ISBN 978-0521405348.
- O'Neill, Patrick (2014). Charles I and the Spanish Plot: Anglo-Habsburg Relations and the Outbreak of the War of Three Kingdoms, 1630-1641 (PHD). University of California.
- Warner, Oliver (1981). Great Sea Battles. Cambridge Ferndale Edns.
- Wedgwood, CV (1938). The Thirty Years War (2005 ed.). New York Review of Books. ISBN 978-1590171462.
- Wilson, Peter H. (2009). Europe's Tragedy: A History of the Thirty Years War. Allen Lane. ISBN 978-0-7139-9592-3.
- Francis Vere (1955). Salt in their blood: The lives of the famous Dutch admirals. Cassell.
- J.C.M. Warnsick (1938). Drie zeventiende-eeuwsche admiraals. Piet Heyn, Witte de With, Jan Evertsen. van Kampen.
- J.C.M. Warnsick (1941). 12 doorluchtige zeehelden. van Kampen.
- Panhuysen, Luc (2021). Het monsterschip: Maarten Tromp en de armada van 1639. Atlas contact. ISBN 978-9045040714.
- Klooster, Wim (2016). The Dutch moment: war, trade, and settlement in the seventeenth-century Atlantic world. Cornell University Press.
