= Portuguese galleon Santa Teresa =

Galleon of the Portuguese Navy (1637–1639)

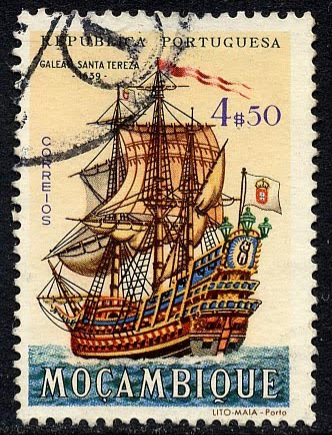
- CTT Correios de Portugal's Mozambican postage stamp showing the galleon Santa Teresa.

History

Portugal
- Name: Santa Teresa
- Namesake: Saint Teresa
- Builder: Ribeira do Ouro, Porto
- Launched: 1637
- Fate: Burned and sunk, 1639
- Notes: Participated in: Battle of the Downs (1639)

General characteristics
- Type: Galleon
- Tons burthen: 1,200 tons
- Sail plan: Full-rigged ship
- Armament: 60 guns

Santa Teresa (English: Saint Teresa) was a 60-gun and 1,200-tonne Portuguese galleon, commanded by Admiral Lope de Hoces during the Battle of the Downs.

The ship had a very short life, and her most notable action was during the Battle of the Downs, on 21 October 1639, where Santa Teresa was commanded by Admiral Lope de Hoces. Santa Teresa was burned by a fire ship, and Admiral Lope de Hoces died.

== Construction and characteristics ==
The galleon was built by Bento Francisco in Porto, and launched in 1637. It was armed with 60 guns, and it had 1,200 tons burthen. It is classified in some contemporaneous documents as a galleon, and as a carrack in others. The galleon was built with wood from Minho, about which, writing the General Don Lope de Hoces to King Philip IV, told him: "Were worthy of being guarded, like the Cerro de Potosí itself, those mountains in Portugal, where such wood was created."

Bore comparison with her more famous contemporaries, the English Sovereign of the Seas and the French Couronne, and in sea-going qualities probably surpassed both of them.

All contemporary accounts of the battle emphasize her strength and beauty; and her destruction by a Dutch fire ship forms the central theme of all contemporary paintings, prints and drawings relating to this famous action.
