= Dutch ship Aemilia (1632) =

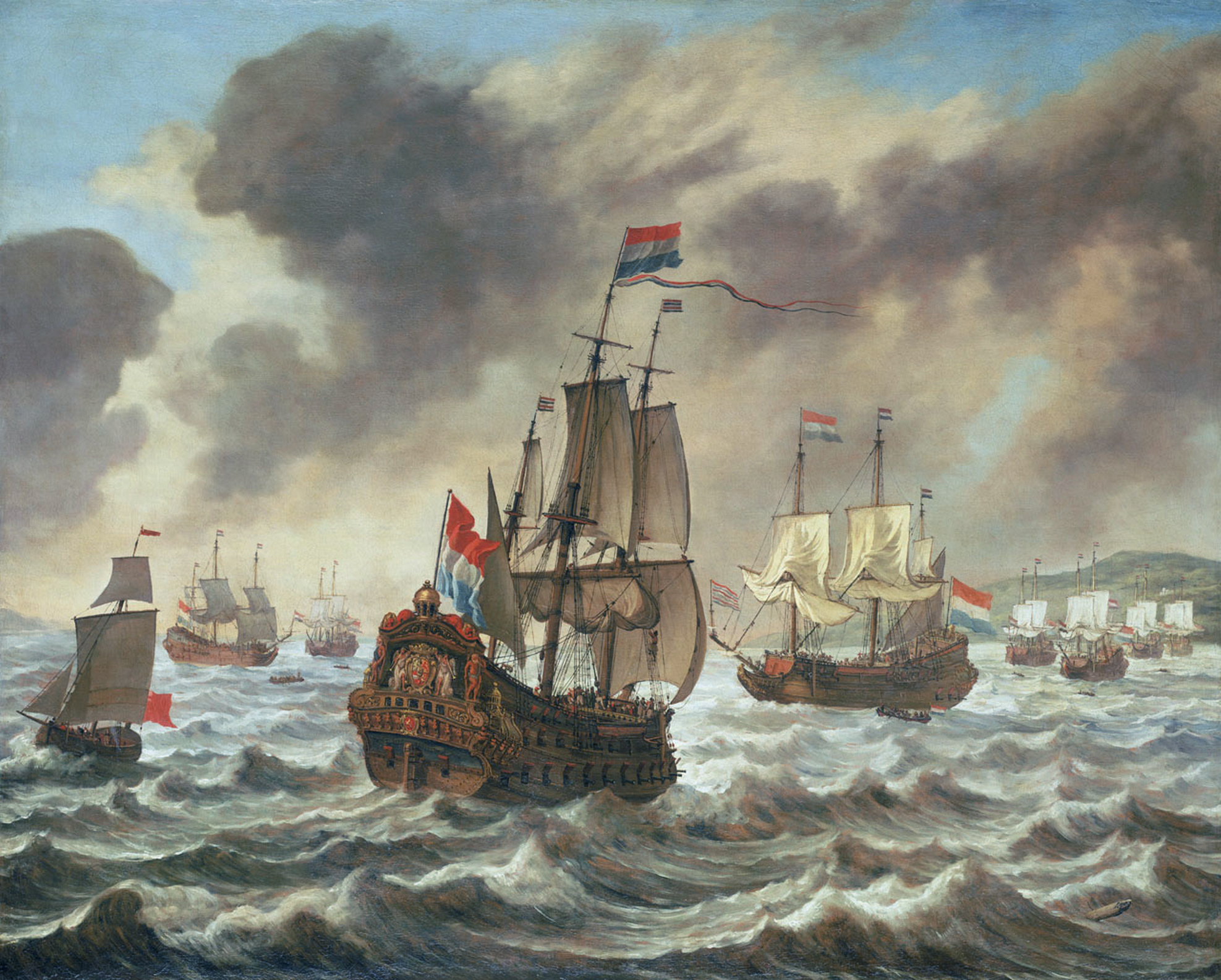
- c. 1639 painting of Aemilia (centre)

History

Dutch Republic
- Name: Aemilia
- Builder: Jan Salomonszoon van den Tempel, Rotterdam
- Launched: 1632
- Fate: Sold to France in 1647, last mentioned in 1651
- Notes: Participated in: Battle of the Downs

General characteristics
- Class & type: 46-gun (later 57-gun) ship of the line
- Tons burthen: 300t
- Length: 133 ft 8 in (40.74 m) (gundeck)
- Beam: 32 ft 6 in (9.91 m)
- Depth of hold: 13 ft (4.0 m)
- Propulsion: Sails
- Sail plan: Full-rigged ship
- Complement: 160 sailors and 30 soldiers
- Armament: 46 guns originally, in 1637 raised to 57 guns: Gundeck: 4 × 36-pounders, 11 × 24-pounders, 9 × 18-pounders; Upper gundeck: 3 × 18-pounders, 21 × 12-pounders; Quarterdeck, Forecastle & Poop deck: 9 × 6-pounders

Aemilia was a ship of the line of the Dutch States Navy. She was built under the direction of the Dutch shipwright Jan Salomonszoon van den Tempel for the Admiralty of Rotterdam and launched in 1632. Initially mounting 46 guns, her armament was increased to 57 guns in 1637. Aemilia served as Lieutenant-admiral Maarten Tromp's flagship during the Eighty Years' War, including at the decisive Dutch victory at the Battle of the Downs in 1639. She was sold to the French in 1647 and served as a privateer in the Mediterranean, where Aemilia was captured by two Spanish warships. Her final appearance in historical records involved being taken to Naples and scrapped in 1651.

== Dimensions ==
The gundeck length of this ship was measured at 132 Maas feet, equivalent to 144 Amsterdam feet or 133 ft 8 in (in English Imperial measurements). The maximum breadth was 32 Maas feet (equal to 35 ft 3 in Amsterdam feet, or 32 ft 6 in Imperial), and the depth in hold was 13½ Maas feet (equal to 14 ft 2 inches in Amsterdam feet, or 13 ft Imperial).

== Service history ==
In 1635, the ship served as the flagship of Vice-Admiraal Witte Corneliszoon de With. In 1636, now carrying 54 guns, the Aemilia, under Kapitein Gerrit Meyndertszoon den Uyl, was the flagship of Lieutenant-Admiraal Philip van Dorp. She was refitted in 1639 and recommissioned as a 57-gun ship Kapitein Barent Barentszoon Cramer, as the flagship of Lieutenant-Admiraal Maarten Tromp. She then took part in the blockading of Dunkirk, including leading the 12-ship Dutch squadron in the action off Dunkirk on 18 February 1639, and in the action off Beachy Head on 17 September on the same year. At the Battle of the Downs, on 21 October 1639, the vessel fought well under the personal command of Tromp.

She transported Queen Henrietta Marie from England to the Netherlands in February 1643, suffering extensive storm damage in the process. She was sold to France soon after and employed as a privateer in the Mediterranean before being defeated in battle and captured by two unnamed Spanish warships. She was last mentioned being taken to Naples in 1651 where the remains of her hull were scrapped.
