= Siege of Fuenterrabía (1638) =

1638 battle of the Franco-Spanish War

Coordinates: 43.3667°N 1.8000°W

Siege of Hondarribia
- Part of the Thirty Years' War and the Franco-Spanish War (1635-1659)
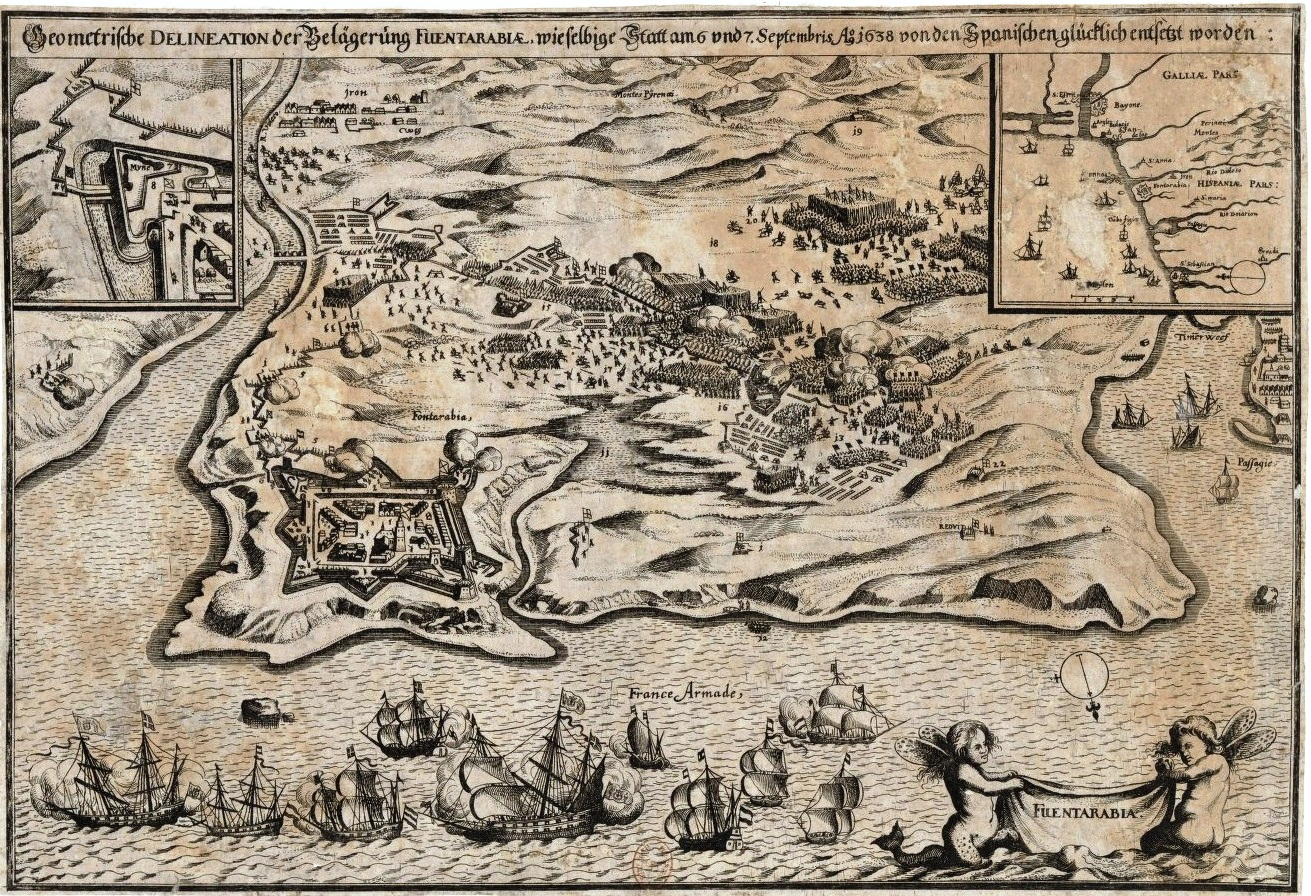
- Etching depicting the 1638 battle
Date	June – September 1638
Location	Hondarribia, Gipuzkoa, Spain
Result	Spanish victory

Belligerents
France	Spain

Commanders and leaders
(Kingdom of France) Henri de Bourbon (Kingdom of France) Henri de Sourdis (Kingdom of France) Bernard, Duke d'Épernon	(Spain) Juan Alfonso de Cabrera

Strength
18,000 infantry 2,000 cavalry 20–30 warships 7,000 sailors	1,300 men (Hondarribia); 15,000 infantry 500 cavalry (Spanish Relief Army)

Casualties and losses
4,000 dead or wounded 2,000 captured	Unknown

The siege of Hondarribia of 1638 took place in June – September 1638, between Spain and France during the Thirty Years' War and the Franco-Spanish War (1635-1659).

The French army commanded by Henri de Bourbon, Prince of Condé, Bernard de La Valette, Duke d'Épernon and Henri d'Escoubleau de Sourdis composed of 27,000 men and several warships besieged the city for two months, firing 16,000 shells into the walled city, leaving only 300 survivors, most of them women and children. The city was virtually destroyed, but nevertheless did not surrender.

On 7 September, the Spanish army led by Juan Alfonso Enríquez de Cabrera, 9th Admiral of Castile, relieved the city and defeated the French forces. The raising of the siege is celebrated annually on 8 September in a parade, known as Alarde.

After the French disaster of Fuenterrabía (Hondarribia), Henri d'Escoubleau de Sourdis attempted to blame the defeat on Bernard de La Valette, Duke d'Épernon, who had refused to lead the attack, believing that it would fail.

For the successful resistance, the city received the title of «Muy noble, muy leal, muy valerosa y muy siempre fiel».
