= List of Dutch naval personnel =

This is an alphabetical list of notable 16th–19th-century Dutch people associated with the Dutch Navy, the Dutch admiralties—the Admiralty of Amsterdam, Admiralty of Friesland, Admiralty of West Friesland, Admiralty of the Maze, and the Admiralty of Zeeland—the Dutch East India Company, and those in service of foreign navies.

During the 17th century, the Dutch Republic was a major maritime power and dominated much of the world trade during a period of intense European commercial rivalry. As such, the Dutch Navy was involved in a number of conflicts against other European powers, of which the Anglo-Dutch Wars are perhaps the best-known example. These naval battles generated numerous naval heroes, especially as the presence of no less than five Dutch admiralties ensured that many flag officers took part.

== Naval personnel ==
- Cort Adeler
- Jurriaen Aernoutsz
- Philips van Almonde
- Laurens Alteras
- Mårten Anckarhielm
- Joris Andringa
- Gerrit Verdooren van Asperen
- Douwe Aukes
- Hans Willem van Aylva
- Adriaen Banckert
- Joost Banckert
- Jacob Binckes
- Pieter de Bitter
- Abraham Blauvelt
- Adriaen Maertensz Block
- Johan Arnold Bloys van Treslong
- Willem Bloys van Treslong
- Willem Bontekoe
- Aegidius van Braam
- Jacob Pieter van Braam
- Jan van Brakel
- Roche Braziliano
- Lodewijk van Bylandt
- Paulus van Caerden
- Gerard Callenburgh
- Theodorus Frederik van Capellen
- Hendrik Carloff
- Joris Carolus
- Jan Carstenszoon
- Anthony Colve
- Baltazar de Cordes
- Abraham Crijnssen
- Jacobus Deketh
- Pieter van der Does
- Cornelis Evertsen the Elder
- Cornelis Evertsen the Younger
- Cornelis Evertsen the Youngest
- Johan Evertsen
- Pieter Floriszoon
- Jan van Galen
- Willem Joseph van Ghent
- Isaack Gilsemans
- Lenaert Jansz de Graeff
- Hendrik Gravé
- Jacob Groenewegen
- Steven van der Hagen
- Hendrick Hamel
- Dirk Hartog
- Leendert Hasenbosch
- Jacob van Heemskerk
- Piet Pieterszoon Hein
- Boudewijn Hendricksz
- Moses Cohen Henriques
- Jacques l'Hermite
- Dooitze Eelkes Hinxt
- Frederick de Houtman
- Gerard Pietersz Hulft
- Abraham van der Hulst
- Pieter Ita
- Willem Janszoon
- Cornelis Jol
- Hendrik August van Kinckel
- Jan Hendrik van Kinsbergen
- Egbert Bartholomeusz Kortenaer
- Mooy Lambert
- Jan Lichthart
- Cornelis de Liefde
- Johan de Liefde
- Hendrick Lonck
- Engelbertus Lucas Jr.
- Engelbertus Lucas Sr.
- Willem van der Marck
- Cornelis Matelief de Jonge
- Pieter Melvill van Carnbee
- Jan Meppel
- Philip de Montmorency, Count of Horn
- Joos de Moor
- Willem Cornelisz van Muyden
- Justinus van Nassau
- Jacob Corneliszoon van Neck
- Aert Jansse van Nes
- Jan Jansse van Nes
- Olivier van Noort
- Pieter Nuyts
- Dirck Gerritsz Pomp
- Jacob Quaeckernaeck
- Laurens Reael
- Jacob Roggeveen
- Adriaen Roothaes
- Engel de Ruyter
- Michiel de Ruyter
- Jan van Ryen
- Gilles Schey
- Volckert Schram
- Cornelis Schrijver
- Herman van Speult
- Joris van Spilbergen
- Enno Doedes Star
- Auke Stellingwerf
- Samuel Story
- Jochem Swartenhont
- Isaac Sweers
- Abel Tasman
- François Thijssen
- Adrian Jorisszen Tienpoint
- Joost van Trappen Banckert
- Cornelis Tromp
- Maarten Tromp
- Carel Hendrik Ver Huell
- Pieter Willemsz Verhoeff
- Roemer Vlacq
- Willem de Vlamingh
- David Vlugh
- David Pietersz de Vries
- Hidde Sjoerds de Vries
- Tjerk Hiddes de Vries
- Maarten Gerritsz Vries
- Johannes van Walbeeck
- Jacob van Wassenaer Duivenvoorde
- Jacob van Wassenaer Obdam
- Sebald de Weert
- Abraham van der Weijden
- Jan Jansz Weltevree
- Jacob Willekens
- Jan Willem de Winter
- Witte de With
- François de Wittert
- Willem van der Zaen
- Willem de Zoete
- Johan Zoutman
- Jan van Speijk
