= Groenewegen =

Groenewegen or Van Groenewegen is a Dutch toponymic surname. Literally translated as "green roads", the name may refer to an origin in one of several hamlets or streets named Groeneweg in the Netherlands. (Note: As of March 2026, there are no articles about places called Groenewegen in either English or Dutch Wikipedia; but several places called Groenewegare included on nl:Groeneweg in Dutch Wikipedia.) Notable people with this surname include:

- Dylan Groenewegen (born 1993), Dutch road racing cyclist
- Han Groenewegen (1888–1980), Dutch architect
- Jacob Groenewegen (died 1609), Dutch merchant
- Jane Groenewegen (born 1956), Canadian (Northwest Territories) politician
- Leo Groenewegen (born 1953), Australian rules footballer
- Leo Groenewegen (born 1965), Canadian football offensive lineman
- Robert Groenewegen (born 1960), Australian rules footballer
- Sara Groenewegen (born 1995), Canadian softball player

Van Groenewegen

- Pieter Anthonisz. van Groenewegen (c.1600–1658), Dutch landscape painter
- Simon van Groenewegen van der Made (1613–1652), Dutch jurist

Groeneweg

- Bram Groeneweg (1905–1988), Dutch long-distance runner
- Suze Groeneweg (1875–1940), Dutch politician; first woman to be elected into the Dutch parliament

Groenwegen

- Nancy G. Groenwegen, American New York State cabinet secretary

== See also ==
- Groeneweg, a surname
