= Made =

Made or MADE may refer to:

== Entertainment ==
=== Film ===
- Made (1972 film), United Kingdom
- Made (2001 film), United States

=== Music ===
- Made (Big Bang album), 2016
- Made (Hawk Nelson album), 2013
- Made (Scarface album), 2007
- M.A.D.E., 2003 album by Memphis Bleek
- "Made" (Scuba Dice song), 2006
- "Made" (The Wanted song), 2010
- Made (band), a Toronto lo-fi band

=== Television ===
- Made (TV series), United States, 2002 to 2014

== Companies ==
- Made.com, an online furniture retailer in London, United Kingdom
- MADE Clothing, an American clothing line around 2005
- The MADE or The Museum of Art and Digital Entertainment

== Geography ==
- Made (Netherlands), a town in the Netherlands

== People ==
- van der Made - Dutch family name
- Dalem Di Made (fl. 1623–1642), Balinese king
- Ida Bagus Made (1915–1999), Balinese painter
- Joseph Made, Zimbabwean politician
- Sacco van der Made (1918–1997), Dutch actor and voice actor
- Simon van Groenewegen van der Made (1613–1652), Dutch jurist
- Tilly van der Made (1938–2019), Dutch runner

== Other uses ==
- Made man, a fully initiated member of the American mafia
- Museum of Australian Democracy at Eureka (M.A.D.E.), an Australian museum
