= Laurens (given name) =

Laurens is a masculine Dutch given name, the equivalent of Lawrence/Laurence. Notable people with the name include:

- Laurens Jan Anjema (born 1982), Dutch squash player
- Laurens Jacobsz Alteras (died 1622), Dutch vice admiral
- Laurens Bake (1629-1702), Dutch poet
- Laurens Bogtman (1900-1969), Dutch baritone singer
- Laurens Jan Brinkhorst (born 1937), Dutch politician
- Laurens Janszoon Coster (c. 1370-c. 1440), Dutch printer
- Laurens Craen (c. 1620–c. 1670), Dutch painter
- Laurens ten Dam (born 1980), Dutch road racing cyclist
- Laurens de Graaf (c. 1653-probably 1704), Dutch pirate, mercenary and naval officer
- Laurens Theodorus Gronovius (1730-1777), Dutch naturalist
- Laurens Hammond (1895-1973), inventor of the Hammond organ
- Laurens ten Heuvel (born 1976), Dutch footballer
- Laurens Hull (1779-1865), American physician and politician
- Laurens Perseus Hickok (1798-1888), American philosopher
- Laurens van der Post (1906-1996), Afrikaner author, journalist, philosopher
- Laurens Reael (1583-1637), Governor-General of the Dutch East Indies (1616-1617) and an admiral of the Dutch navy (1625-1627)
- Laurens Shull (1894-1918), American football player, businessman and soldier
- Laurens Pieter van de Spiegel (1736-1800), Grand Pensionary of Zeeland and later of Holland
- Laurens Vanthoor (born 1991), Belgian auto racer
- Laurens van der Vinne (1658-1529), painter from the Netherlands
- Laurens van Hoepen (born 2005), Dutch racing driver
- Laurens De Vreese (born 1988), Belgian road bicycle racer
