= Groeneweg =

Groeneweg' is a surname of Dutch origin. Notable people with that name include:

- Bram Groeneweg (1905–1988), Dutch long-distance runner
- Suze Groeneweg (1875–1940), Dutch politician

== See also ==
- Groenewegen, a surname
