= Douwe Aukes =

Frisian sea captain

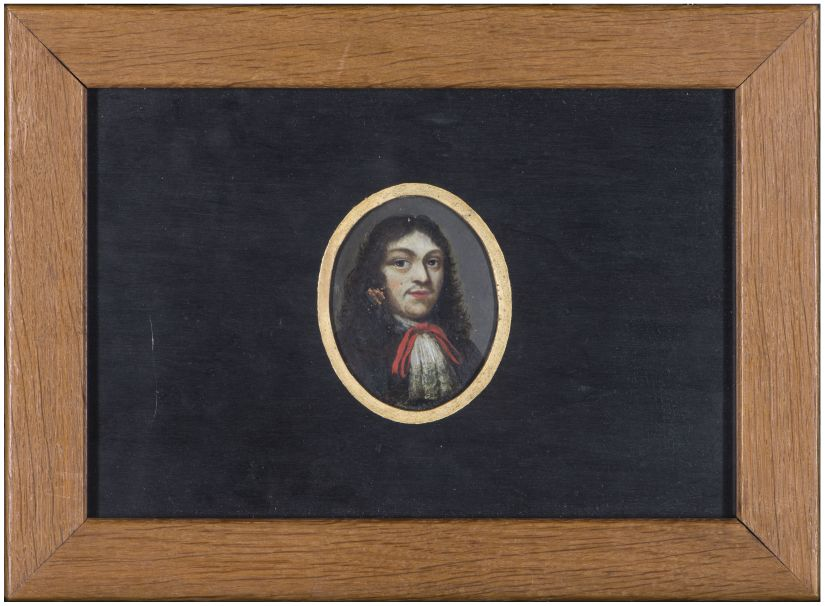
Anonymous portrait of Douwe Aukes, 1661 to 1670, Fries Museum

Douwe Aukes (c. 1612–1668) was a Frisian sea captain of the Dutch East India Company or VOC. The Douwe Aukes class minelayer and its name-ship the HNLMS Douwe Aukes were named after him.

== Life ==
He was the son of another VOC captain, also called Douwe Aukes. He made several trips to South Africa on the ships Maastricht and Vrede and in 1641 he was made captain of the 40-gun Vogelstruys of the VOC's Amsterdam Chamber, which was seconded to Michiel de Ruyter's fleet in 1652 during the First Anglo-Dutch War (with Aukes thus indirectly becoming a naval officer).

At one point during the Battle of Plymouth in August 1652 the Vogelstruys wandered from the Dutch fleet and was almost surrounded by English ships, but Aukes threatened to ignite a powder keg and blow up the ship, rather than surrender. His crew then managed to beat off an English boarding party, almost sink two English ships, badly damage a third and finally regain the main Dutch fleet. Vogelstruis, still under Aukes' command, fought at the Battle of the Kentish Knock in September 1652 and the Battle of Portland in 1653, where Aukes and his ship were captured. The Vogelstruis was later taken into English service as Estridge (or Ostrich).

After the war Aukes continued as a VOC captain, being mentioned in a 1657 document as the captain of a koopvaarder (merchant ship) trading with the Levant and in one from 1665 as a merchant in Amsterdam. When Tjerk Hiddes de Vries was killed in 1666, during the Second Anglo-Dutch War, Aukes was requested to replace him as lieutenant-admiral in the Admiralty of Friesland by the States of Friesland, but Aukes declined, being then on the return voyage from India, during which he died. He is buried in Amsterdam's Oude Kerk.
