= Tjerk Hiddes de Vries =

Tierck Hiddes.

Tjerk Hiddes de Vries (6 August 1622 – 6 August 1666) was a Dutch States Navy officer. The French, who could not pronounce his name, called him Kiërkides. His name was also given as Tsjerk, Tierck or Tjerck.

== Early life and childhood ==
Tierck was born in 1622 in the province of Friesland (Frisia), in the village of Sexbierum as the son of a poor farmer called Hidde Siurds and his wife Swab Tjeirckdochter. At the age of twelve, he went to sea. In 1648 he married Nannetje Atses; the couple settled in Harlingen, Frisia's main port. In 1654 he had attained the rank of master.

== Naval career ==
During the Northern Wars Tjerk was appointed captain of a troop transport, the Judith, that in 1658 was part of Lieutenant-Admiral Jacob van Wassenaer Obdam's expeditionary fleet against Sweden to relief Copenhagen. In the Battle of the Sound the sea soldiers of the Judith boarded and captured three Swedish vessels. He was rewarded for this by being appointed extraordinary captain with the Admiralty of Frisia, one of the five autonomous Dutch admiralties.

During the Second Anglo-Dutch War Tjerk was appointed full captain on 27 March 1665. He commanded d' Elff Steden in the Battle of Lowestoft, managing with great personal courage to free his ship from an entanglement with several other burning Dutch vessels, set alight by an English fireship. This fight was a severe defeat for the Dutch and those who by their bravery set a contrast to the general incompetence shown during the battle, were hailed as heroes by the populace. Tjerk in a written report severely criticised his fallen supreme commander Van Obdam. The Frisian admiralty board, in need to replace the also killed Lieutenant-Admiral of the Frisian fleet, Auke Stellingwerf, and sensing the public mood, appointed Tjerk Lieutenant-Admiral of Frisia on 29 June 1665. He thus jumped two ranks, not an uncommon occurrence for the Dutch navy in that century.

Normally the Frisian fleet was rather small, but in view of the emergency the province made a strong war effort, building 28 new vessels, Tjerk supervising the formation of the strongest naval force Frisia would ever send out.

In the Four Days Battle of 1666, Tjerk, now calling himself De Vries ("The Frisian"), was second in command in the squadron of the Zealandic Lieutenant-Admiral Cornelis Evertsen the Elder. When the latter was killed on the first day, Tjerk became the squadron commander, still using as flagship his Groot Frisia. He specially fought well on the last, fourth, day, strongly contributing to the Dutch victory. Six weeks later during the St James's Day Battle he was second in command of the van under Lieutenant-Admiral Johan Evertsen. When this squadron failed to reform a proper keel line after a calm, and was mauled by the line of Admiral Rupert of the Rhine. Tjerk had an arm and a leg shot off; yet still in vain tried to rally his force. His crippled ship drifted away, only discovered by the Dutch rear under Cornelis Tromp the next day. The wounded Frisian admiral was speedily brought ashore in Flushing by a yacht - but died from his wounds on his birthday, 6 August 1666.

== After his death ==
Tjerk Hiddes is buried in the Grote Kerk of Harlingen; his grave memorial has been destroyed. Four days after his death his son Tjerk Hiddes the Younger was born, who shortly after his birth was promised a future captain's commission by the admiralty to honour the memory of his father. Tjerk junior would indeed become a naval captain. Hiddes de Vries was succeeded as Lieutenant-Admiral of Frisia on 16 March 1667 by Baron Hans Willem van Aylva.

Tjerk in the 18th and 19th century gained in fame as a Frisian folk hero. In 1932, a Dutch writer wrote a book about him: Tierck Hiddes, de Friesche zeeheld.

== Dutch Navy ships ==
The Dutch Navy has named several ships in his honour:

1. HNLMS Tjerk Hiddes (1939)
2. HNLMS Tjerk Hiddes (G16)
3. HNLMS Tjerk Hiddes (F804)
4. HNLMS Tjerk Hiddes (F830)
