= Enno Doedes Star =

Dutch admiral (1631–1707)

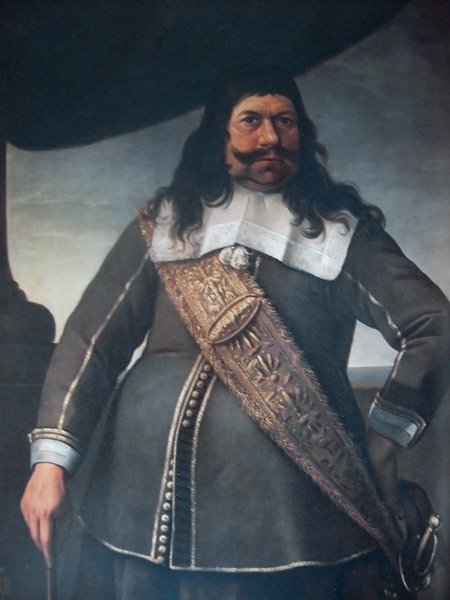
Enno Doedes Star by Bartholomeus van der Helst

Enno Doedes Star (Osterhusen 1631 – Wirdum 1707) was a Dutch admiral.

Star was born in East Frisia, an area just outside the Dutch Republic that, however, in the 17th century had close religious and linguistic ties with it. He started his career in the Dutch Navy in 1658 when he took service with the Admiralty of Amsterdam in the rank of extraordinary captain. For three years he had convoy duty in The Channel, protecting Dutch merchantmen from Portuguese privateers during the Dutch-Portuguese War. In 1661 and 1664 he commanded the supply ship Groene Kameel, supporting the Dutch Mediterranean Fleet. This fleet, under command of Vice-Admiral Michiel de Ruyter, towards the end of 1664 was ordered to execute a punitive expedition against English possessions in West-Africa, after the British had captured Dutch trading posts there. After defeating the English, De Ruyter crossed the Atlantic to raid English colonies in the Americas. Upon his return to the Republic in the summer of 1665, it transpired that the Second Anglo-Dutch War had formally broken out. Star was promoted to full captain.

In 1666 Star commanded the Gouden Leeuw of sixty cannon, a ship of the Vereenigde Oost-Indische Compagnie, the Dutch East Indies Company, during the Four Days Battle and the St. James's Day Battle. In the latter fight the vice-admiral of the Admiralty of Friesland, Rudolf Coenders, was killed. The States of Groningen had the right to choose a successor; on 13 December 1666 on commendation of De Ruyter they appointed Star. As the commander of the Frisian Fleet, Lieutenant-Admiral Tjerk Hiddes de Vries, had been killed also, Star functioned as acting lieutenant-admiral until the appointment of Lieutenant-Admiral Hans Willem van Aylva on 16 March 1667. Star in 1667 participated in the Raid on the Medway, in the later phases of the campaign commanding a squadron blockading Harwich, using as flagship the Groningen of seventy cannon.

In 1672, during the Franco-Dutch War, Baron van Aylva became an infantry general and would never return to sea. Star thus again functioned as acting commander of the Frisian Fleet during the Third Anglo-Dutch War, fighting in 1672 during the Battle of Solebay (flying his flag in the Greoningen) and in 1673 during the Battles of Schooneveld and the Battle of the Texel, still on the Groningen. In 1678 he commanded part of the auxiliary fleet supporting Spain against France. Star's last campaign was during the War of the Grand Alliance when he in 1691 commanded a squadron in the Anglo-Dutch fleet operating in the Irish Sea. That year he retired, still in the rank of vice-admiral.

Star around 1652 married with Reynouw Gaickinga and had three children, a daughter and two sons. After the death of his first wife he remarried with Cornelia Pars, born in Appingedam. At his retirement he settled in his estate, or buitenplaats, Bolhuis at Wirdum in Groningen, where he deceased in 1705 or 1707.
