= Van der Made =

van der Made is a Dutch toponymic surname. The name is first found in the records of a crusade in the 11th century. Bartolomeus van der Made donated land in the mid 14th century to what is now the Oude Kerk in Delft. "Van der Made" means "from the meadow", but the name is also particularly common around the village Made in North Brabant.

People with the name "van der Made" include:

- Sacco van der Made (1918–1997), Dutch actor
- Simon van Groenewegen van der Made (1613–1652), Dutch jurist
- Tilly van der Made (1938–2019), Dutch middle-distance runner

People with the concatenated version Vandermade include:

- Jordan Vandermade (born 1987), New Zealand television presenter
- Lenny Vandermade (born 1981), American football coach

A street in Amsterdam is named van der Madeweg and a metro station is in turn named after that street.
