= Leendert Hasenbosch =

Dutch naval bookkeeper and castaway

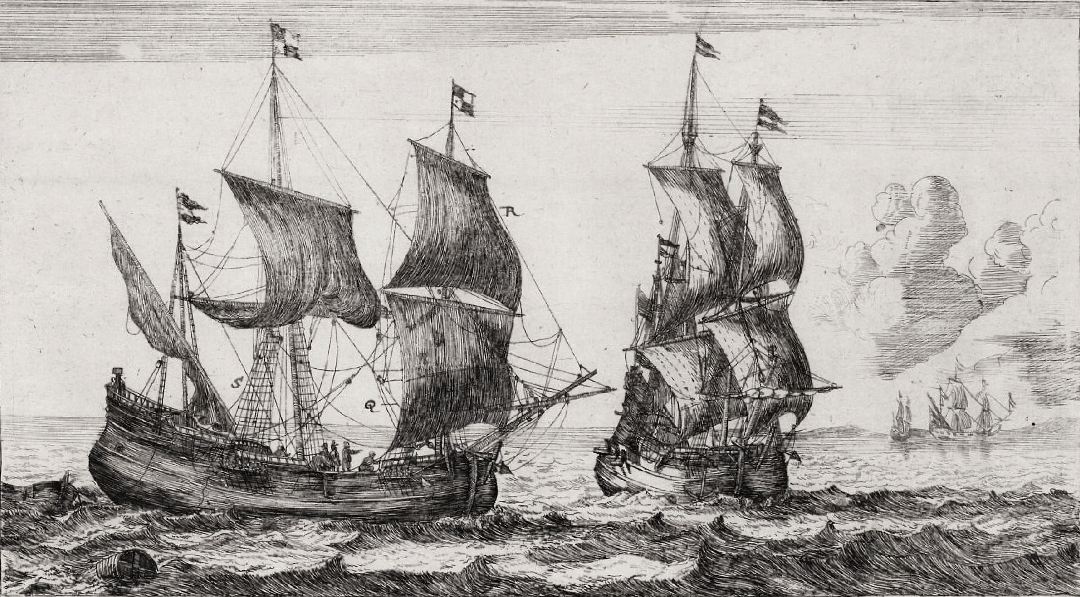
Port View With Two Flute Ships, copper engraving by Reinier Nooms, late 17th century.

Leendert Hasenbosch, (c. 1695 – probably end of 1724) was a Dutch employee of the Dutch East India Company (Dutch: Vereenigde Oostindische Compagnie, commonly abbreviated to VOC) who was marooned on (at the time uninhabited) Ascension Island in the South Atlantic Ocean, as a punishment for sodomy. He wrote a diary until his presumed death; the diary was recovered by British sailors and its English translation was published in London.

== Early life ==
Leendert Hasenbosch was likely born in The Hague, Holland in 1695. Around the year 1709 his father, a widower, moved himself and his three daughters to Batavia in the Dutch East Indies (modern Indonesia) while Leendert stayed in Holland. On 17 January 1714, Hasenbosch became a soldier of the VOC and boarded the flute-ship Korssloot in Enkhuizen bound for Batavia, where he served for about a year. From 1715 to 1720 he served in Kochi, India, a Dutch possession at the time. In 1720 he returned to Batavia and was promoted to corporal. He later became a military writer, responsible for small-scale bookkeeping. In 1724, he took a position aboard a VOC ship as the ship's bookkeeper.

On 5 May 1724, Hasenbosch was set ashore on Ascension Island as punishment for sodomy. It appears that the ship's boy was a minor, held the lowest possible status on board (a deckhand). His name is not mentioned neither in archieves nor in the diary.

== Castaway life ==
During his time as a castaway, Hasenbosch kept a diary. He began with a tent, a month's worth of water, some seeds, instruments, prayer books, clothing, and writing materials. He searched the barren island for water. Although he found water various times, it was never in consistent supply and during a prolonged period of drought, he began drinking the blood of green turtles and seabirds, as well as his own urine, water found inside the bodies of dead turtles, and even the urine inside the bladders of those turtles. He likely died of thirst after about six months.

A similar punishment was meted out two years later to two boys from the Dutch East India Company ship the Zeewijk, shipwrecked off the west coast of Australia. Found guilty of sodomy, the boys were marooned on separate islands of the Mangrove Group of Houtman Abrolhos, and left to die.

Ascension Island does have two sources of fresh water: a strong water spring in the high interior of the island (in what is now called Breakneck Valley), and a much smaller water source named Dampier's Drip. One of these two water sources allowed some sixty men from HMS Roebuck to survive a shipwreck on Ascension for two months starting in February 1701.

== The legend ==
In January 1725, British sailors from the ship James and Mary discovered the castaway's tent and belongings, including the diary in Dutch. The British concluded that a Dutchman had been set ashore as a punishment for sodomy. They did not find a skeleton but they believed that the man had died of thirst. The diary was taken back to Britain.

In 1726, the translated diary was first published under the title Sodomy Punish'd. In 1728 another version, entitled An Authentick Relation, was published. The version of 1726 mentions the name of the castaway, misspelled as "Leondert Hussenlosch" but the version of 1728 states that the man's name is unknown. The qualities of both translations are uncertain since the original diary has been lost. Apart from entries about desperate searches for water and firewood, a few entries mention the man's act of sodomy. A few entries can be interpreted as reflections of a guilty conscience, including the apparitions of demons and former friends and acquaintances. In 1730 another version was published under the title The Just Vengeance of Heaven Exemplify'd. This version contains many extra anti-sodomy passages as well as many extra demons harassing the castaway. The publisher also wrote that the castaway's skeleton would have been found alongside the diary – which never happened.

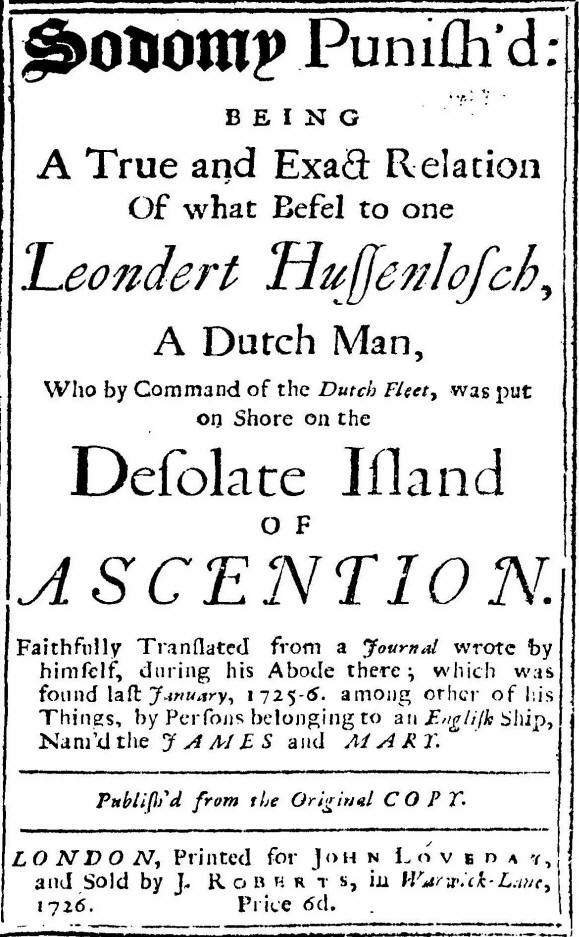
Title page of 'Sodomy punish'd: Being a true and exact relation of what befel to one Leondert Hussenlosch, a Dutch man, who by command of the Dutch fleet, was put on shore on the desolate island of Ascention.' John Loveday, London 1726.

In 1976, American author Peter Agnos published The Queer Dutchman, a fictionalised account based on the version of 1730. Many authors of sodomy, Ascension Island, or castaway stories, read either the version of 1730 or the version of 1976 and included parts of them in their own publications, not realising they were quoting from a fake story.

As late as 1988, recountings of the stories of castaways in English still claimed his name was unknown.

In 2002, a Dutch book Een Hollandse Robinson Crusoë (English: "A Dutch Robinson Crusoe") was published, written by the Dutch historian Michiel Koolbergen (1953–2002) after he had done many years of research in Dutch and British archives; Koolbergen died before the book's publication. Koolbergen had identified the castaway as 'Leendert Hasenbosch' by his work in archives; Koolbergen was aware of all English versions of the diary except that of 1726. Koolbergen's book also contained the relevant texts in the logs of the two British ships whose crews had found the diary in January 1726.

In 2006, the full story was – with the support of Koolbergen's family and publisher – published by Alex Ritsema, with the book A Dutch Castaway on Ascension Island in 1725; a second, revised edition was printed in 2010.

== Artistic tributes ==
The English playwright and performer Dan Hazelwood wrote and performed the stage play Ascension, based on the diary and story of Hasenbosch; directed by Max Lindsay and co-starring Conor Mainwaring, the production premiered at the Edinburgh Festival Fringe in 2024 and returned in 2025 following sold-out performances at Greenwich Theatre and further shows in Hastings.

The Australian composer Lydia Gardiner (b. Perth, 1999), with librettist Javier Bateman, composed an hour-long multimedia work entitled The Zeewijk Passion about the experiences of Leendert Hasenbosch; the work was premiered and recorded in the Netherlands in June 2025.

== See also ==
- Utrecht sodomy trials
- Zeewijk shipwreck
