= Hermanna Molkenboer-Trip =

Dutch industrialist

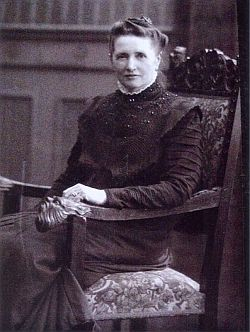
Hermanna Molkenboer-Trip

Hermanna Molkenboer-Trip (1851–1911), was a Dutch industrialist.

She was the daughter of lawyer Scato Trip (1807–1871) and Martha Cornelia Blok (1825–1867). In 1875 she married Johannes Hermanus Molkenboer (1845–1892), owner of the major textile industry Oldenzaalsche Stoomweverij J.H. Molkenboer jr in Oldenzaal in Twente. She became the company's managing director when she was widowed in 1892. Her company provided linen to the dowry of the queen upon the royal wedding in 1901, and was given a royal warrant in 1902. Besides managing director of the Oldenzaalsche Stoomweverij J.H. Molkenboer jr., she established the firm's mail-order company and thus became a pioneer in mail-order shipping in the Netherlands. Throughout Europe, affluent ladies could order their linen sets from the mail-order company. In the Palthehuis in Oldenzaal stands a large Molkenboer handcart. This was used every day to transport the huge amount of parcels to the post office and distribute them across the Netherlands and Europe.

In 1898, Molkenboer participated as a textile manufacturer in the National Exhibition of Women's Labour in The Hague, one of the highlights of the first feminist wave. There she was in charge of the industry hall where, among other things, she showed wearable clothes, without corsets. The eureka fabric used for this was woven in her factory.

Molkenboer's sons Scato and Hermannus took over the business from Molkenboer in 1904. Descendant Steven Molkenboer published a book detailing the history of the firm and his family in 2024.
