= Harlingen, Netherlands =

Harlingen Harns (West Frisian)
- Municipality
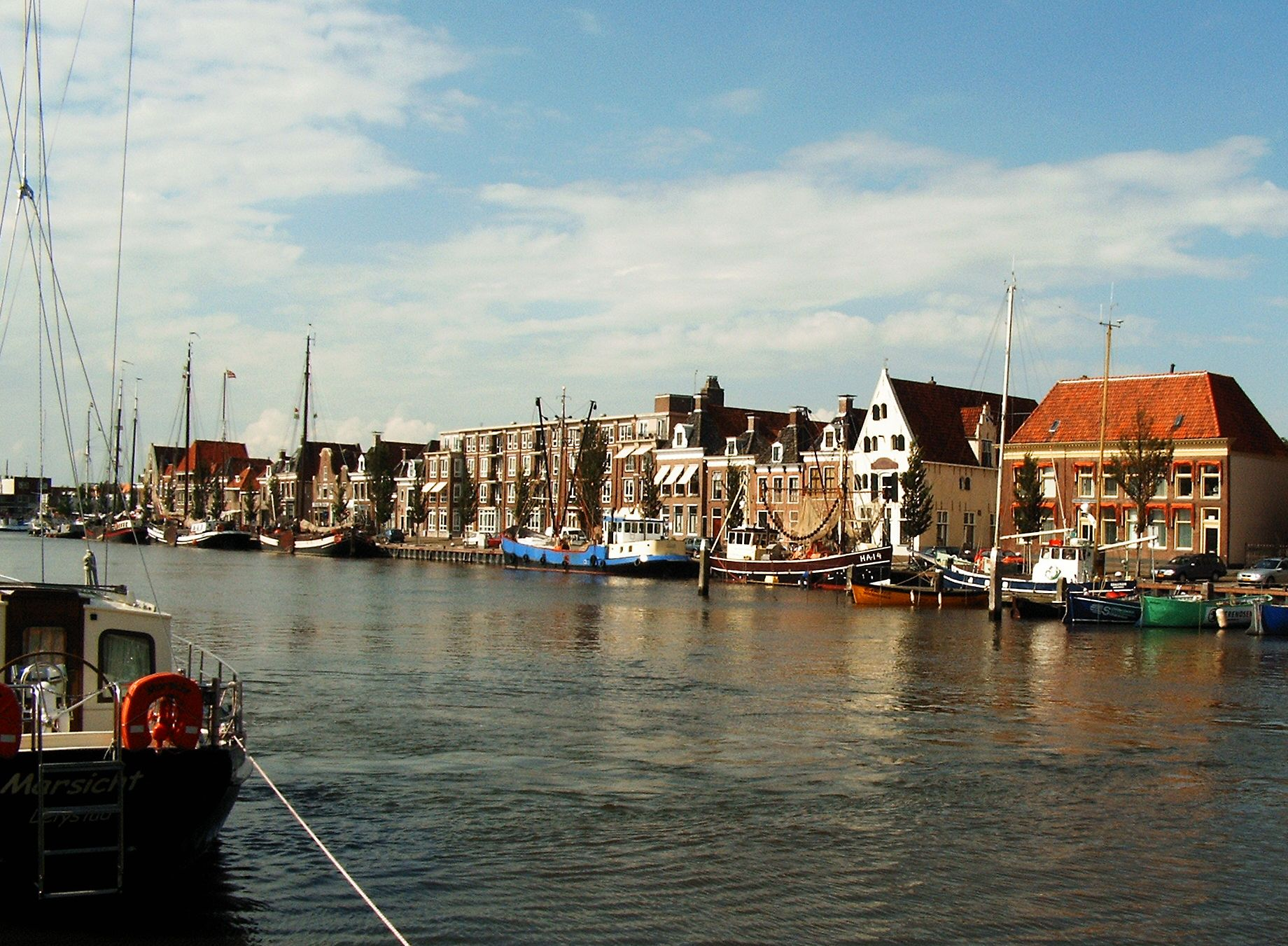
- Zuiderhaven Harbor, Harlingen

- Flag Coat of arms

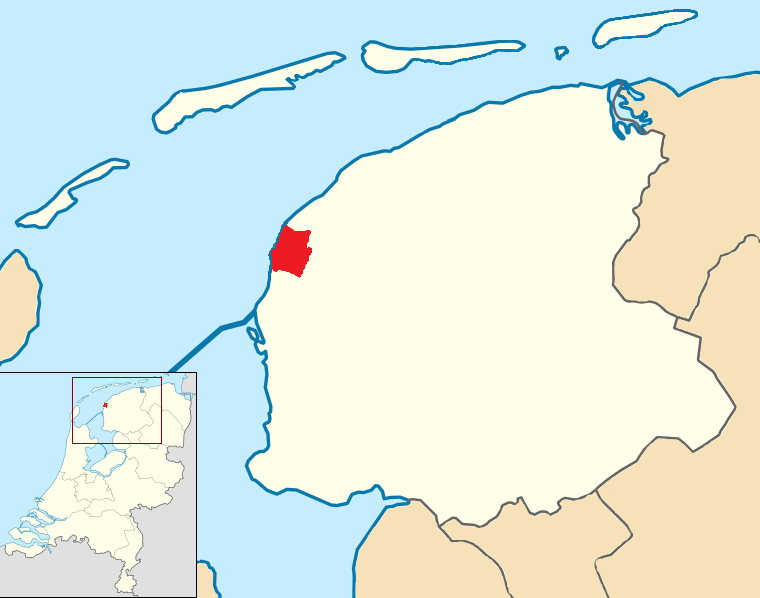
- Location in Friesland
- Coordinates: 53°11′N 5°25′E
- Country: Netherlands
- Province: Friesland

Government
  - Body: Municipal council
  - Mayor: Roel Sluiter (PvdA)

Area
  - Total: 387.67 km^{2} (149.68 sq mi)
  - Land: 24.96 km^{2} (9.64 sq mi)
  - Water: 362.71 km^{2} (140.04 sq mi)
- Elevation: 2 m (6.6 ft)

Population (January 2021)
  - Total: 15,807
  - Density: 633/km^{2} (1,640/sq mi)
- Demonym: Harlinger
- Time zone: UTC+1 (CET)
  - Summer (DST): UTC+2 (CEST)
- Postcode: 8857–8872
- Area code: 0517
- Website: www.harlingen.nl

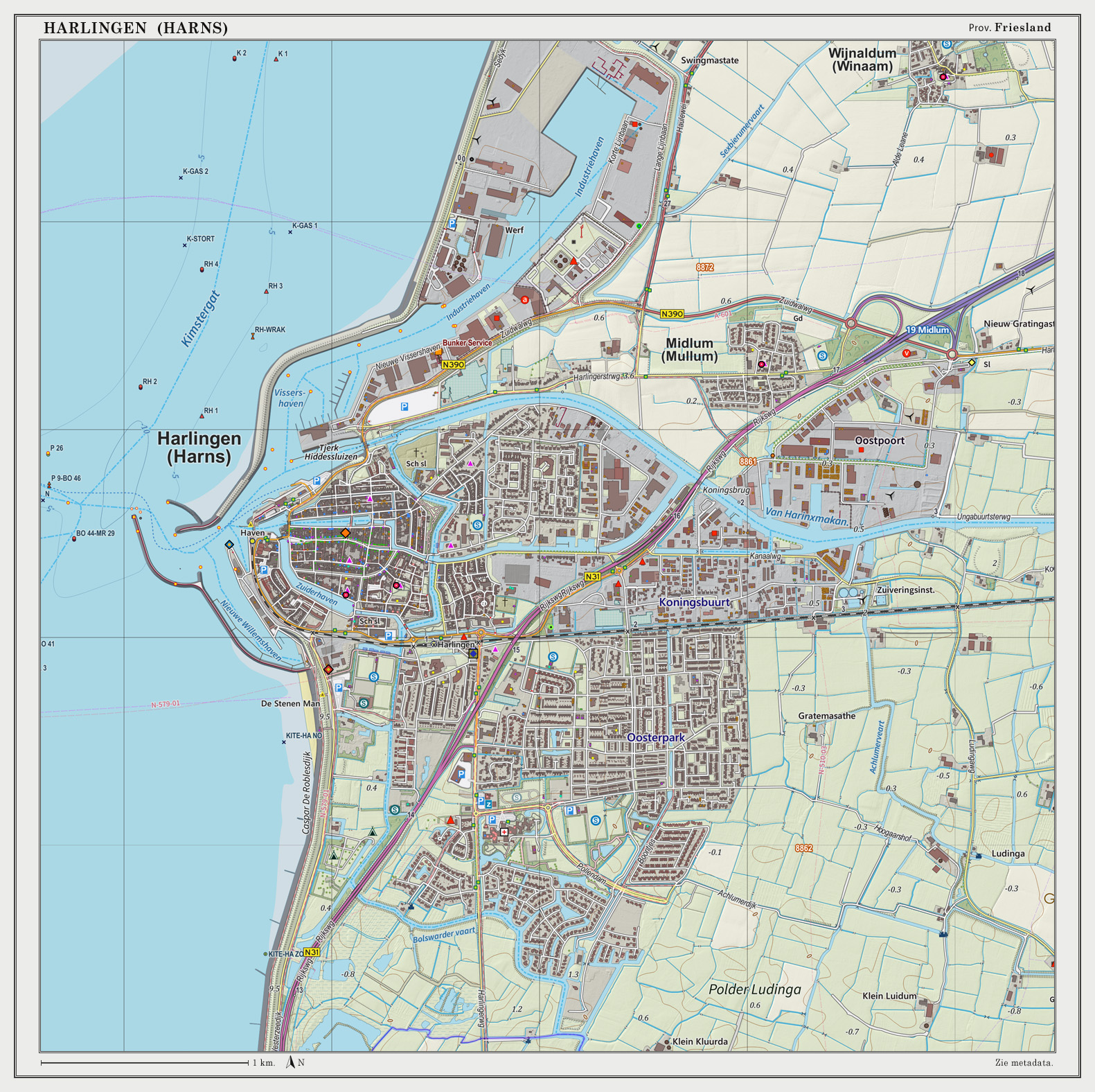
Dutch Topographic map of Harlingen, June 2014

Harlingen (Dutch: [ˈɦɑrlɪŋə(n)]; West Frisian: Harns [hãːs]) is a municipality and a city in the northern Netherlands, in the province of Friesland.

== Overview ==
=== Harbor ===
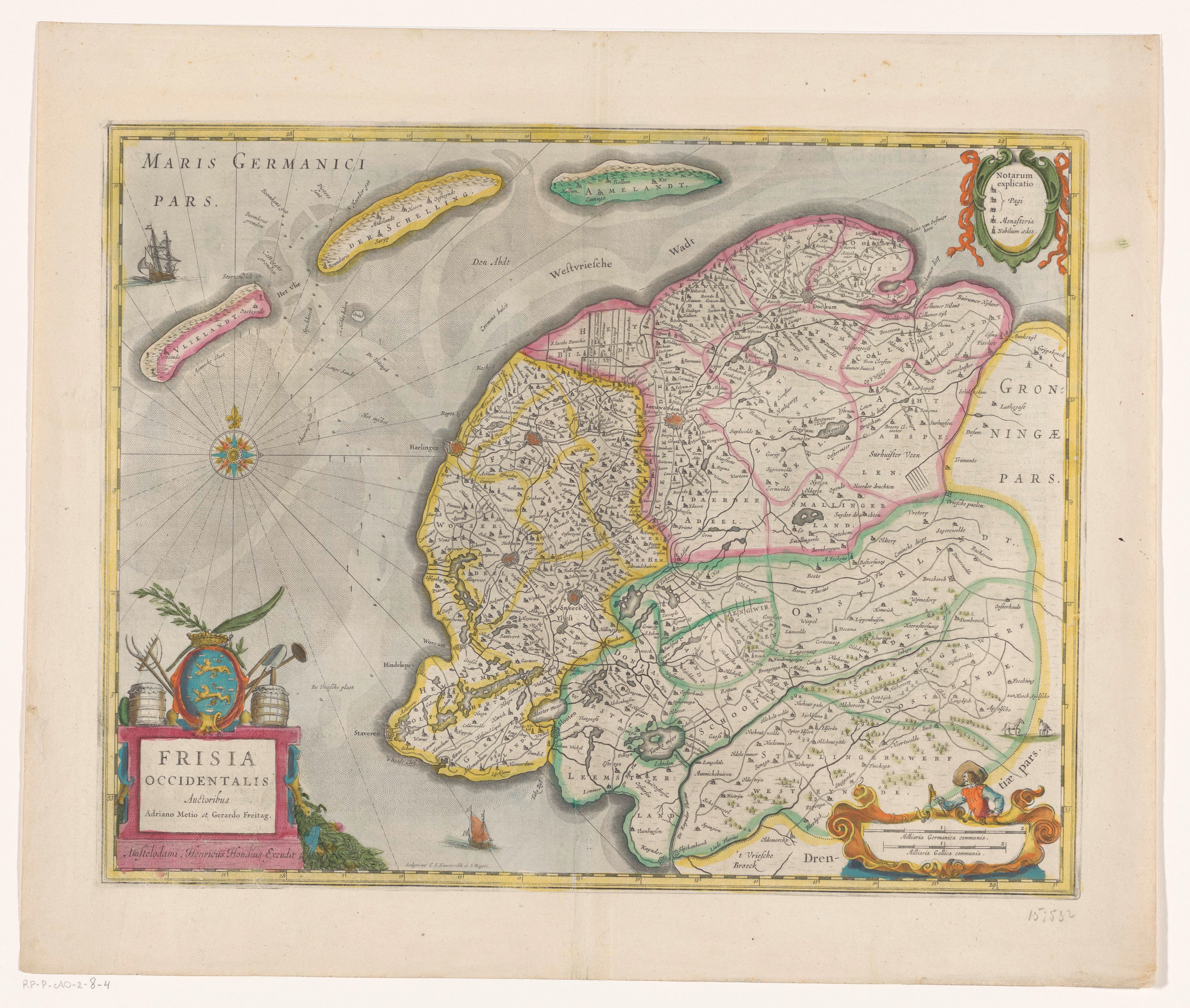
Map showing navigable parts of the Wadden Sea

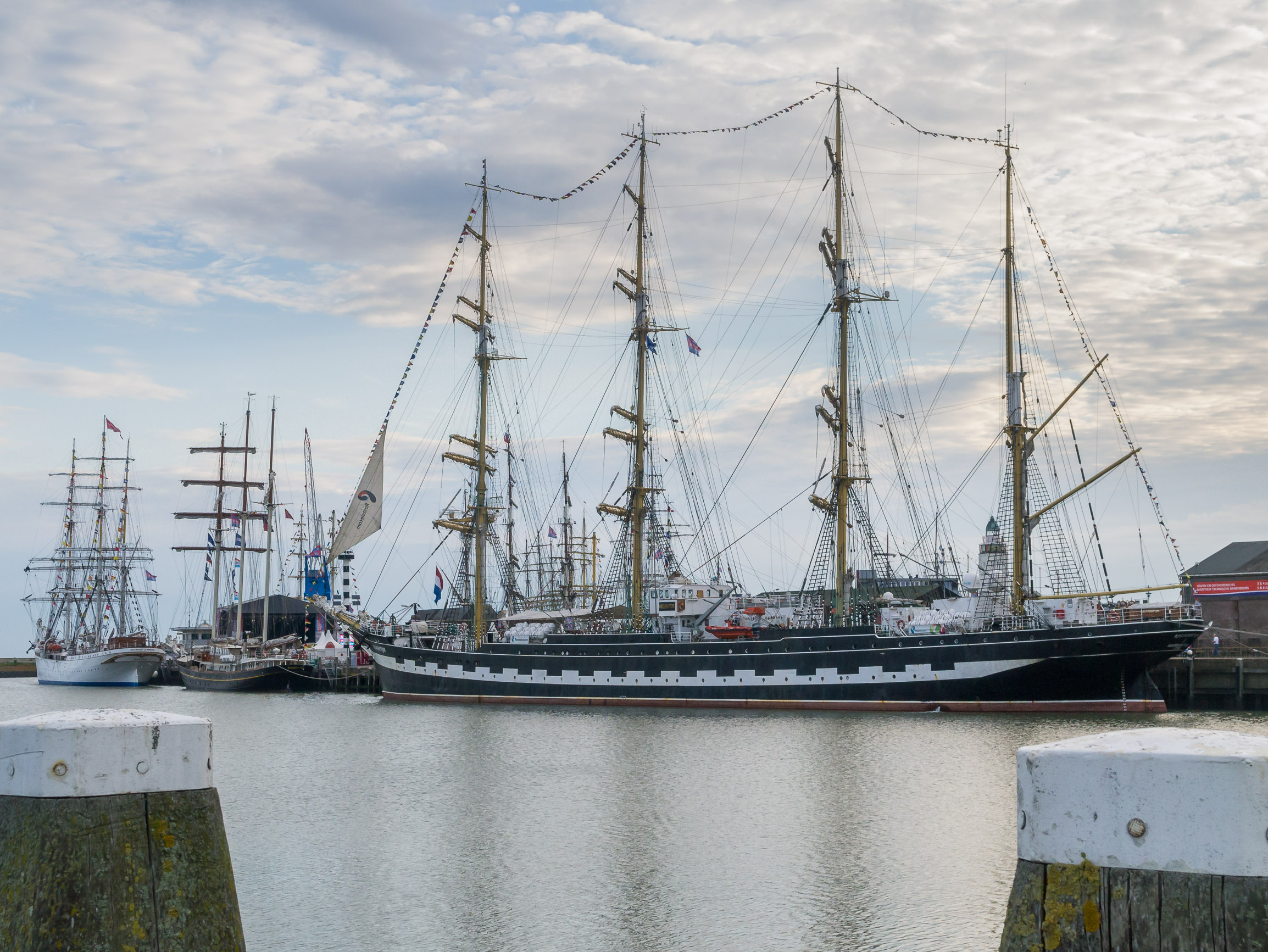
Kruzenshtern at Harlingen in 2014

Harlingen is located on a tip of the Friesland coast that sticks out a bit into the Wadden Sea. Harlingen's location is adjacent to some natural navigable routes through the Wadden Sea. This makes that the town still has a maritime character. However, the location on the Wadden Sea has always put limits on traffic to Harlingen. Even though the largest sailing ships can now reach Harlingen, this was not the case historically.

=== Tourism ===
The center of Harlingen has many monumental buildings. As a whole, the center is a protected view (beschermd stadsgezicht). In combination with its location on the Wadden Sea and the large fleet of historical shallow draught sailing vessels that operate out of Harlingen, this makes the town a center for tourism in Friesland. The municipality works to improve the connection between these attractions so the tourism can grow to its full potential.

=== Public transport ===
Harlingen is served by two stations on the railway line from Leeuwarden. Rederij Doeksen operate ferries to the Wadden islands of Vlieland and Terschelling that depart from Harlingen.

== History ==
=== Medieval times ===
Harlingen is a town with a long history of fishing and shipping. Historically, it was a two hour walk west from Franeker. It supposedly received city rights before it was walled. In 1462 most of the settlement was lost to a fire.

Harlingen was involved in the Vetkopers and Schieringers wars. In 1496 the inhabitants of Franeker, which supported the Schieringer party, conquered the lightly fortified city by surprise. Those of Groningen supported Harlingen and the Vetkopers, and had previously built a strong castle near the sea, but due to the surprise it was lost. In 1498 Albert III, Duke of Saxony landed in Harlingen to support the Schieringer party and founded a new castle at the same place, which started the fortification of Harlingen.

=== The early modern period (1500–1800) ===
The first significant event of the early modern period was the first expansion of the fortified town in 1543. During the opening phases of the Eighty Years' War (1566–1648) a lot of religious fugitives settled in Harlingen. Many of these were Mennonites, a baptist branch of Protestantism. In 1579 and 1580 this led to a second major expansion of the town, which brought the village of Almenum into the city perimeter. Almenum holds a special place in the Christian history of Frisia.

In 1597 a third expansion followed. It led to the demolition of the old city walls, except for two round towers on the water front. A more modern system of earthen fortifications replaced it. It had five bastions on the east side and the ability to inundate most of the surrounding countryside.

In 1645, the Admiralty of Friesland was moved to Harlingen. It had previously been established in Dokkum in 1597. This admiralty had ten councilors: four from Friesland; one each from Gelderland, Utrecht, Holland, and Overijssel; and two from Groningen. In 1770 the admiralty building on the Nieuwe Haven burned down together with a number of adjacent warehouses. These had not been rebuilt by 1791.

After the reformation, the Dutch Protestant Church had two churches; the church called the "Dome of Harlingen" in Almenum, and the smaller Wester Kerk. The many Menonites, had two ministers. The Lutherans had their own church. The Catholics had a clandestine church, which was legal, but had to remain discreet.

The town hall was on the southern side of the Oude Haven. Behind it was the Weigh house and nearby the Korenbeurs a building where the grain trade took place. The town had a Latin school with three teachers. There was an orphanage or shelter for the children of the poor.

In the later 18th century, Harlingen was the second city of Friesland with about 7,500 inhabitants. The city was heavily dependend on trade. From the Baltic, merchants brought cereals, timber, flax, hemp, pitch, tar, and other shipping necessities. Harlingen also imported a lot of wine. All these goods were forwarded through the whole province as well as to Groningen province. The imports also led to the foundation of multiple wind powered sawmills in the vicinity.

Harlingen exported: butter, cheese, peas, beans, horses, cattle, and sheep. The animals were embarked at Harlingen and shipped to Holland and even outside of the Dutch Republic.

As regards industry, the inhabitants made sails, bombazine, Velours d'Utrecht, yarn, etc. Near the city a lot of salt was made. There were several works for roof tiles and for saucers and dishes. Harlingen also had some lime kilns. These early industrial enterprises relied on the fact that peat could cheaply be transported over water to Harlingen. Fishing was another steady means of existence for the population.

All this trade and industry had multiple causes. The first consisted of the natural navigable trenches in the Wadden Sea that connected to Harlingen. The second were the harbor works, which were greatly improved with the third city expansion in 1597. At that time, the Nieuwe Haven and the Oude Buitenhaven were created, both within the city limits. The Buitenhaven stuck out into the Wadden Sea with two dams. It meant that Harlingen was a port. However most of the heavily loaded ships had to transload on the roadstead or harbor before the town, before they could enter the Buitenhaven.

The third reason for the maritime activity in Harlingen was that the whole of Westergoa discharged its water on the Wadden Sea via two locks that exited in the Nieuwe- and Oude Haven. This was somewhat of a guarantee that the trenches in the Wadden Sea would remain in place. It also allowed the city to control the water level in the canals of Westergo. The most important of these was the Harlingertrekvaart from Harlingen to Franeker and then to Leeuwarden, most of which would later become part of the van Harinxmakanaal. In the 1640s, the municipalities of Harlingen and Leeuwarden constructed a towpath along the Harlingertrekvaart. This allowed for reliable and frequent transport to the town's hinterland. In the 18th century, there was a daily connection by boat from Harlingen to Amsterdam and vice versa.

=== 19th century ===
Harlingen's port remained significant in the 19th century. Already in the 1820s, the Amsterdamsche Stoomboot Maatschappij made a stop at Harlingen part of her Amsterdam-Hamburg line. While this was later omitted, Harlingen would retain a steam powered line to Amsterdam. Steam powered ships opened some new opportunities, especially for the export of agricultural products to England. By 1846 this was very important for the Frisian economy and led to severe competition between the shipping lines. After some time, the St. Petersburg Steamship Company came to dominate the export to London. The export of live cattle was much easier with steam boats and became important because cattle had to be slaughtered near the place of consumption. By 1870 the General Steam Navigation Company (GSNC) also had a regular cattle line between London and Harlingen. In April 1876 GSNC acquired the boats of the Petersburg Steamship Company and thus eliminated this competitor. In 1896 the route to Harlingen was one of GSNC's most profitable lines. In the late 1890s, the GSNC ships on this line got cooling facilities. This allowed the export of the famous Frisian dairy products, especially butter with even less damage during transport.

The Harlingen–Nieuweschans railway was constructed between 1863 and 1868, before either Leeuwarden station or Groningen station got a connection to the south. This might have been related to the importance of the harbor of Harlingen. Later on Harlingen got a connection to a local light rail train service. From 1904 to 1935 there was a passenger service on the North Friesland Railway, freight being carried until January 1938.

The famous Dutch writer Simon Vestdijk was born in Harlingen and used to depict his hometown in his writings as Lahringen.

The town of Harlingen, Texas, in the United States is named after this city because many of the original settlers of the Texas town came from Harlingen.

== Population centers ==
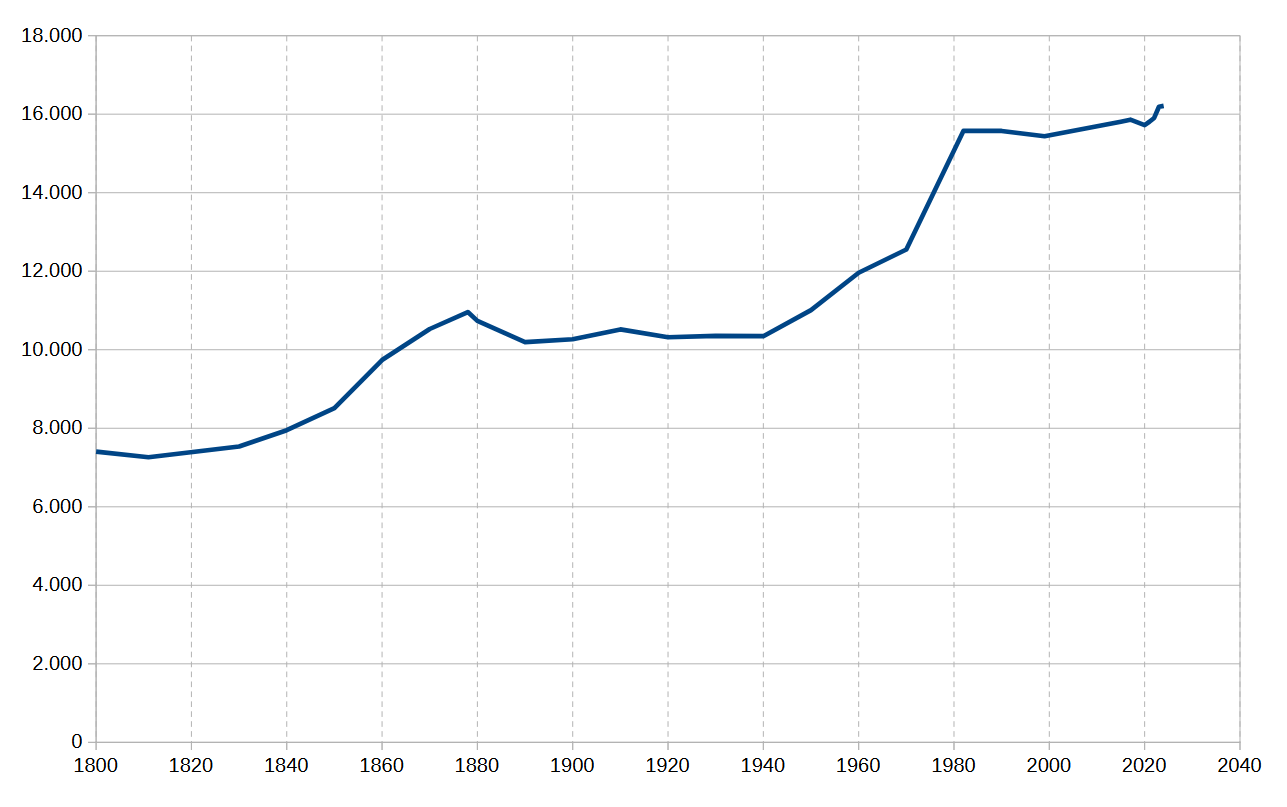
Historical population

- Harlingen (West Frisian: Harns)
- Midlum (Mullum)
- Wijnaldum (Winaam)

== Notable people ==
- Simon Frisius (c.1570–75 – c.1628/29) a Dutch engraver.
- Maarten Gerritszoon Vries (1589–1647) Dutch cartographer and explorer
- Sebastiaen Jansen Krol (1595–1674) Director of New Netherland 1632/1633
- Jacob Adriaensz Backer (1609–1651) a Dutch Golden Age painter
- Tako Hajo Jelgersma (1702–1795) a Dutch painter
- Jacobus Deketh (1726–1764) a captain in the Frisian Admiralty
- Joannes de Mol (1726–1782) a Dutch minister, Patriot and porcelain manufacturer
- Hermanna Molkenboer-Trip (1851–1911) a Dutch industrialist
- Court Lambertus van Beyma (1753–1820) a public notary and auctioneer, delegate of the States of Friesland
- Nicolaas Baur (1767–1820) was a Dutch marine artist
- Johannes Kayser (1842–1917) a Dutch architect, primarily of churches
- J. J. L. Duyvendak (1889–1954) a Dutch Sinologist and professor of Chinese
- Simon Vestdijk (1898–1971) a Dutch writer, nominated 15 times for the Nobel Prize in Literature
- Peter J Sterkenburg (1955–2000) a Dutch autodidact painter of maritime scenes
- Jan Ykema (born 1963) a former ice speed skater, 1988 Winter Olympics silver medalist
- Abe de Vries (born 1965) a Frisian poet, essayist, literary critic, journalist, editor, translator and photographer
- Joost Vandebrug (born 1982) a Dutch photographer, video director and documentary film director

== Gallery ==
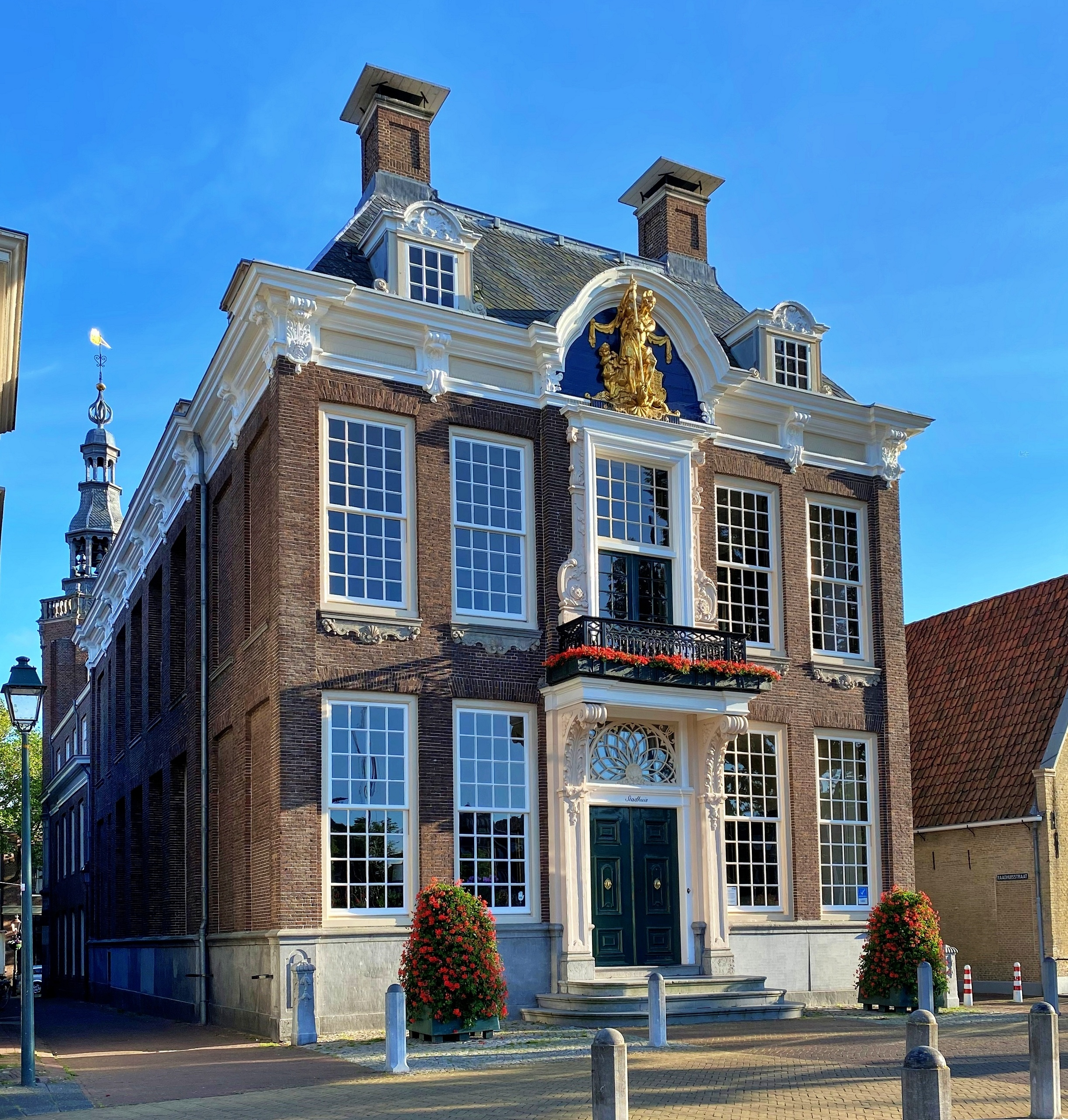
Harlingen, town hall

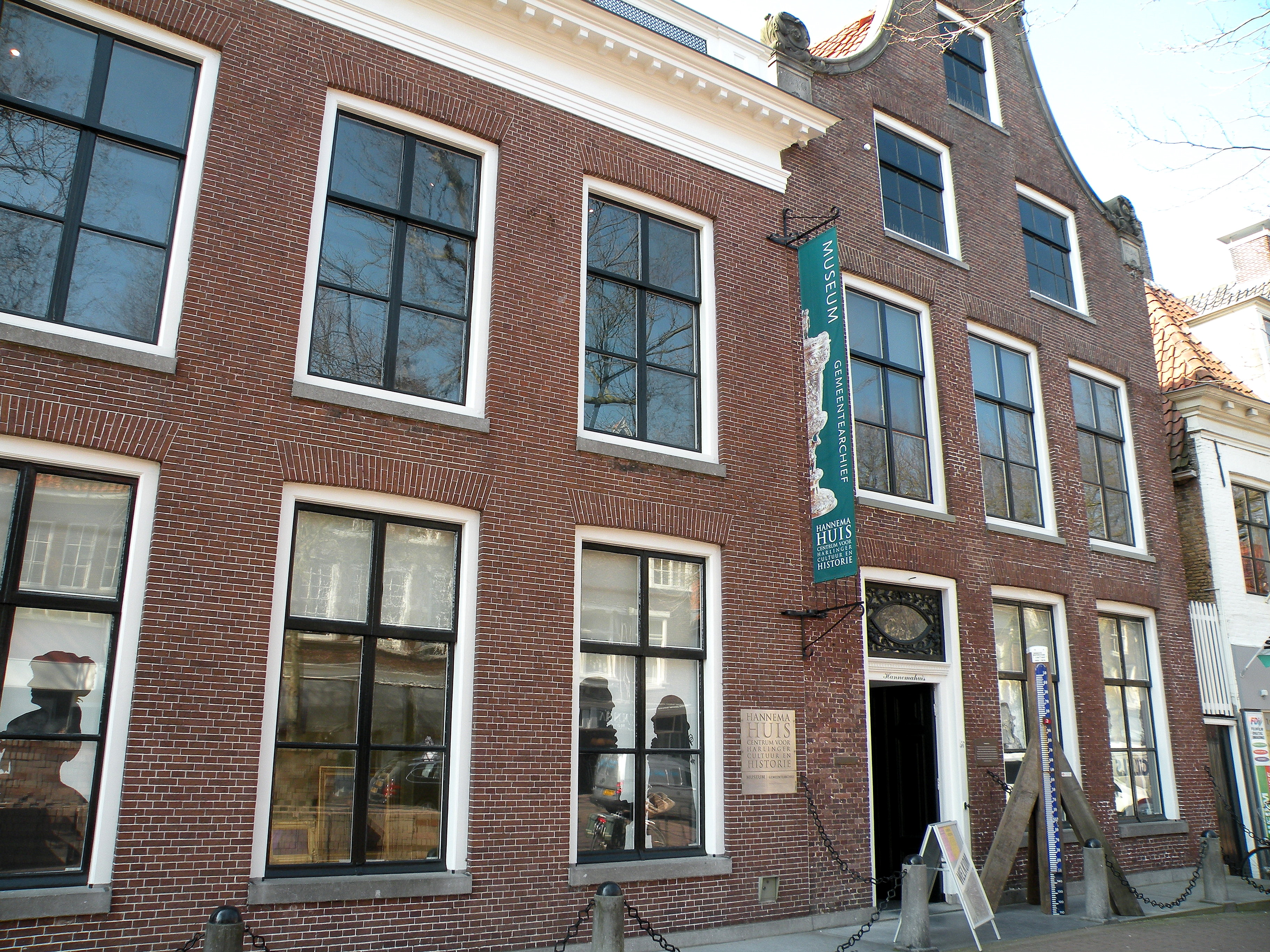
Museum Het Hannemahuis

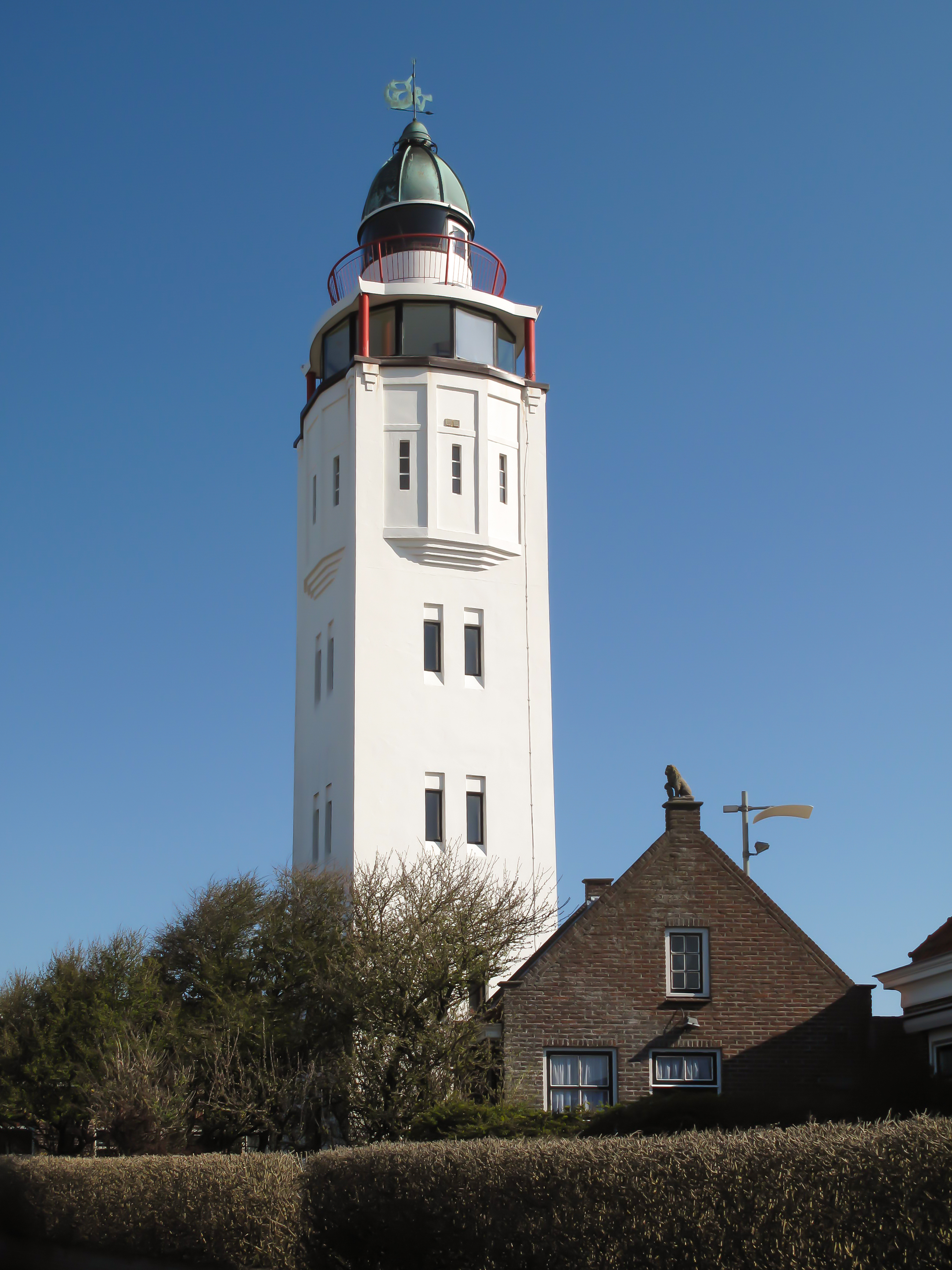
Harlingen Lighthouse

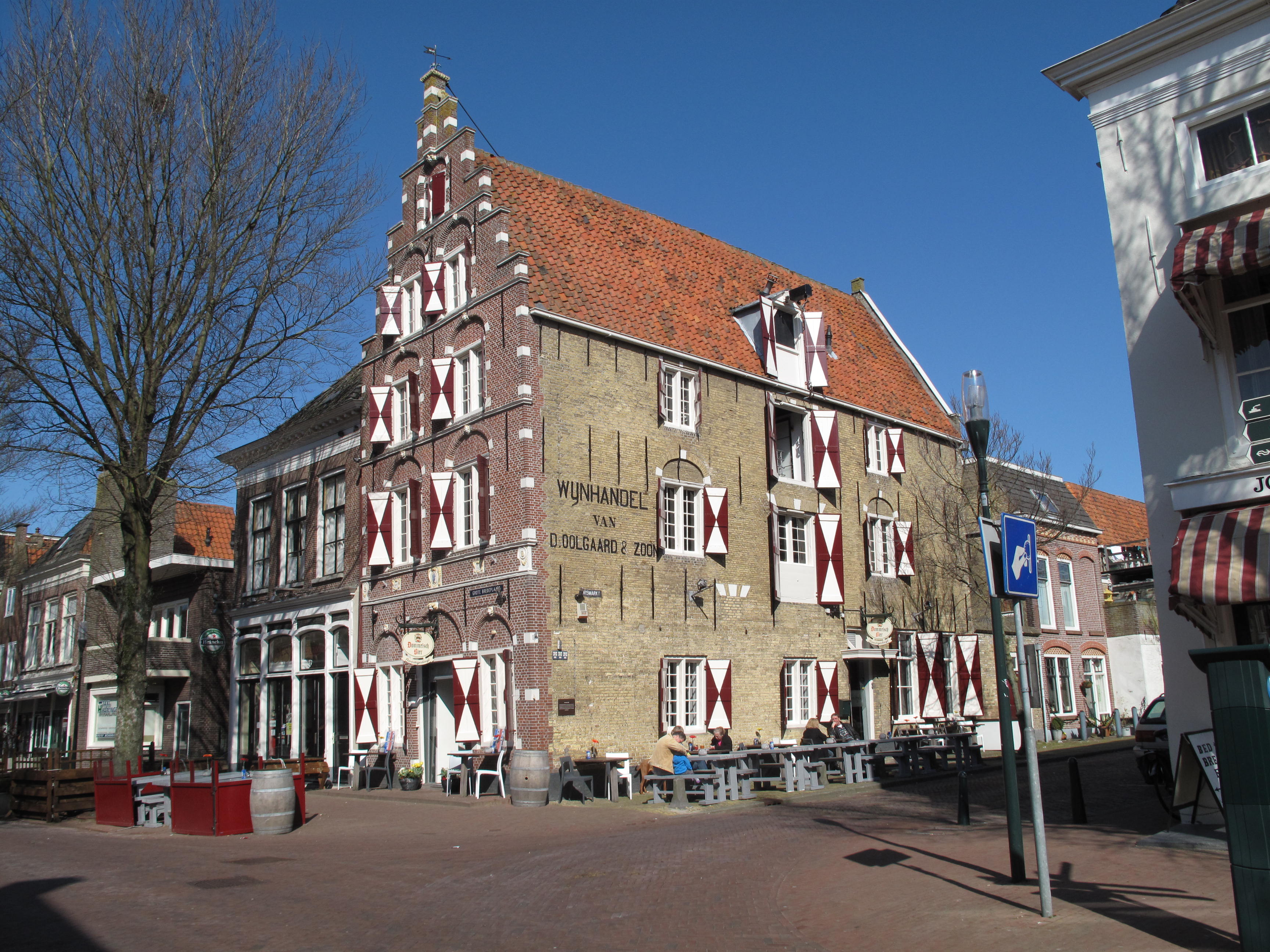
Harlingen, monumental building

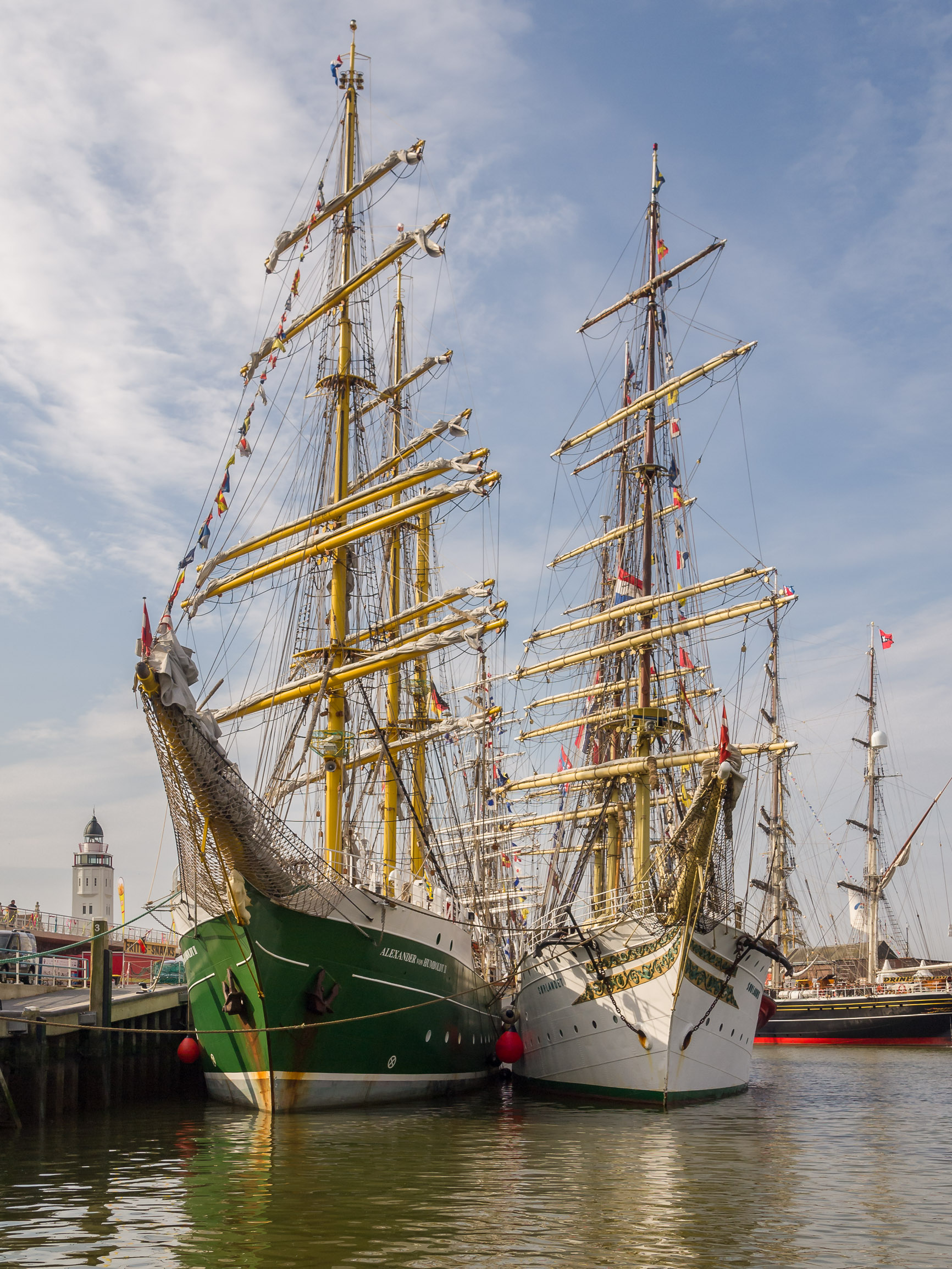
Harlingen Harbor during the Tall Ship Races in 2014
