= Auke Stellingwerf =

Dutch admiral

Auke Andriesz Stellingwerf
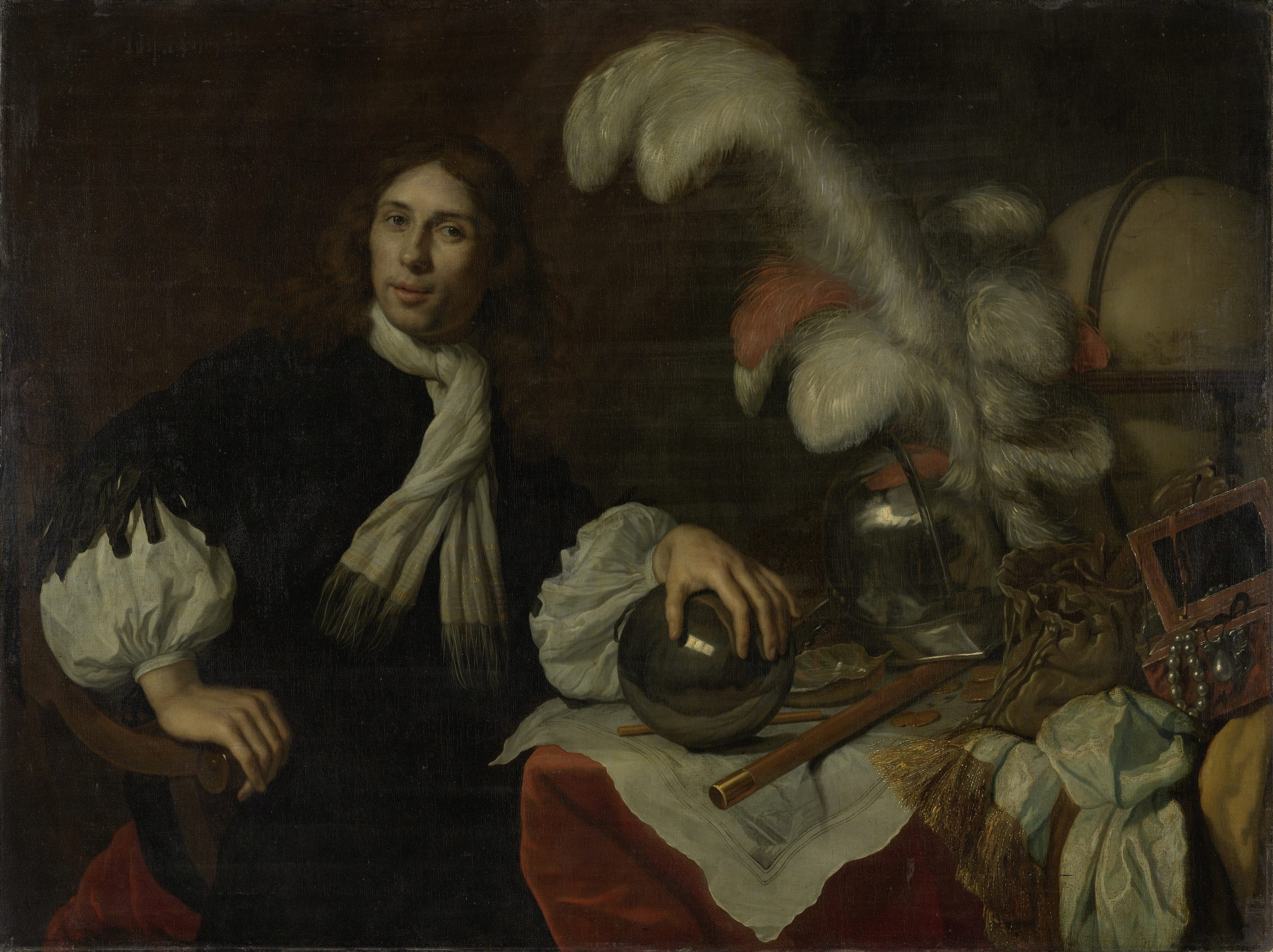
- Portrait of Stellingwerf by Lodewijk van der Helst
- Born: 1635; Harlingen, Dutch Republic
- Died: June 13, 1665; Off Lowestoft, English Channel
- Spouse: Antie Jans Sanstra
- Military career
- Allegiance: Dutch Republic
- Branch: Navy
- Service years: 1653–1665
- Rank: Luitenant-Admiraal
- Conflicts: Battle of Scheveningen; Battle of the Sound; Battle of Lowestoft

Auke Andriesz Stellingwerf (1635, Harlingen, Dutch Republic – 13 June 1665, off Lowestoft, English Channel) was a Dutch admiral who served the Admiralty of Friesland and fought in various naval engagements.

== Life ==
Stellingwerf was born in Harlingen in 1635. His father was Andries Pietersz Stellingwerf. After his older brother, Frederik Stellingwerf, was taken captive during the First Anglo-Dutch War, Auke was appointed captain of the Admiralty of Friesland at the age of 19.

Stellingwerf captained the Des Prinsen Wapen during the relief of Danzig (1656) in the Northern War of 1655–1660 and fought in the Battle of the Sound (1658) on the Prinses Albertina.

In 1662 he married Antie Jans Sanstra. After this, he was appointed First Lieutenant-Admiral of Friesland. Stellingwerf died on 13 June 1665 while commanding the fourth squadron in the Battle of Lowestoft for the Dutch Republic. This battle marked the heaviest naval defeat in the history of the Republic.
