= Admiralty of Friesland =

One of the five admiralties of the Dutch Republic

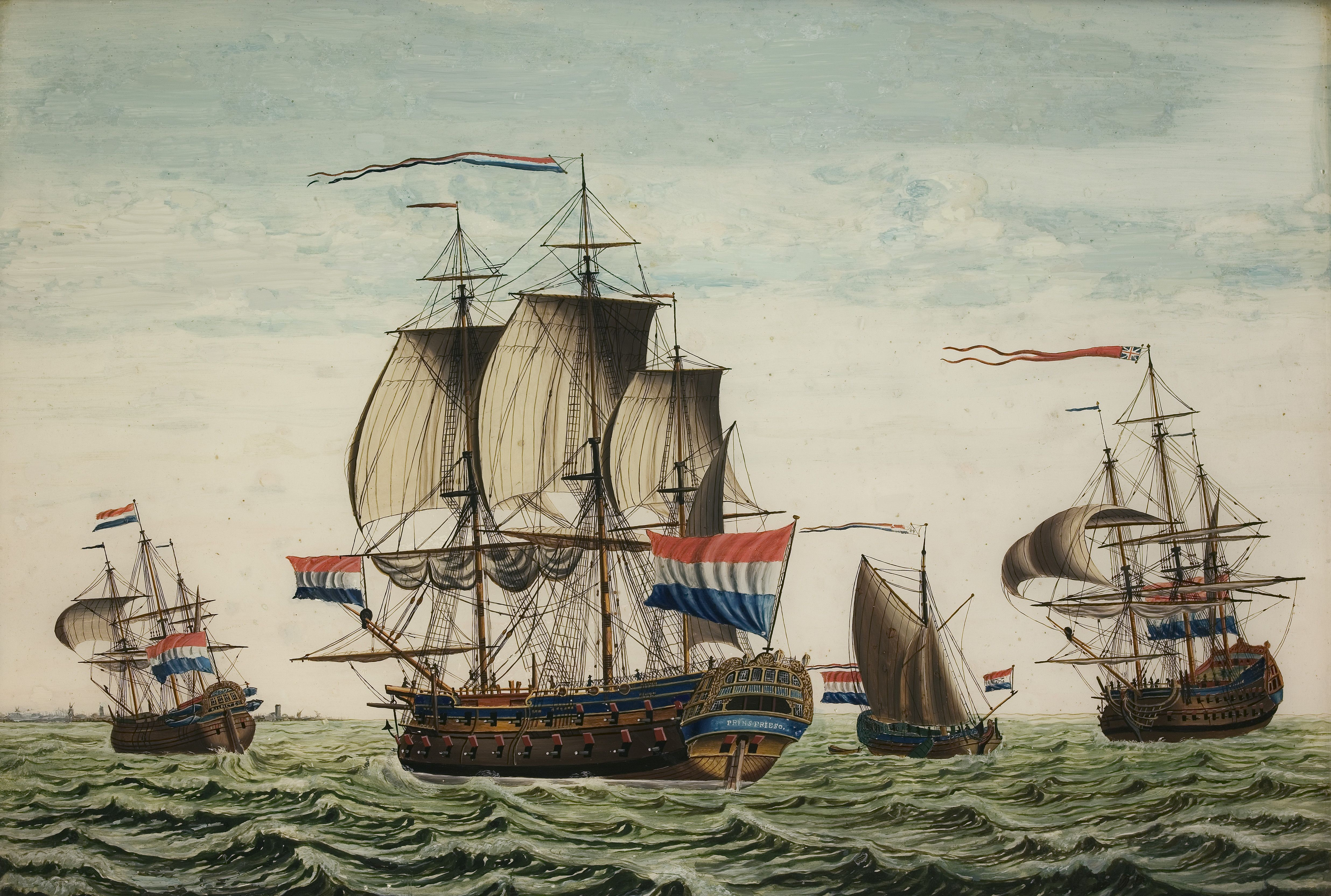
The Friso, a ship of the Frisian Admiralty

The Admiralty of Friesland or Frisian Admiralty (Dutch: Admiraliteit van Friesland or Friese Admiraliteit; West Frisian: Fryske Admiraliteit) was one of the five Dutch admiralties of the Dutch Republic. Set up on 6 March 1596, it was dissolved in 1795 during the reforms by the Batavian Republic.

== Destruction of the admiralty archives ==
Few sources on the Frisian Admiralty survived. The entire archive on the admiralty was destroyed in the large fire of 12 and 13 February 1771 in Harlingen, and many maps and documents relating to the history of Friesland were also lost. What little archive material remained was held in the Department of Navy at The Hague, until that too was destroyed by fire on 8 January 1844. Little is known on the great men of the admiralty, due to a lack of surviving archival material. One example of such loss is described by historian Beucker Andreae, who studied the life of Admiral Auke Stellingwerf. About his search on the latter's baptismal records in what might have been the man's birthplace, Workum, he wrote:

A box had been kept, however, by the church guardians, holding old books and manuscripts, among which, according to an elderly inhabitant of the town, the baptismal records should have been present. But that box had some years ago been given to the deacons for safe-keeping, and there — since there was no lock on the lid — the female supervisor of the old people's home had cut up the books she discovered in the box for domestic use, as sewing patterns! And so it came about that, although the box is still there, the papers can no longer be found in them.

== History ==
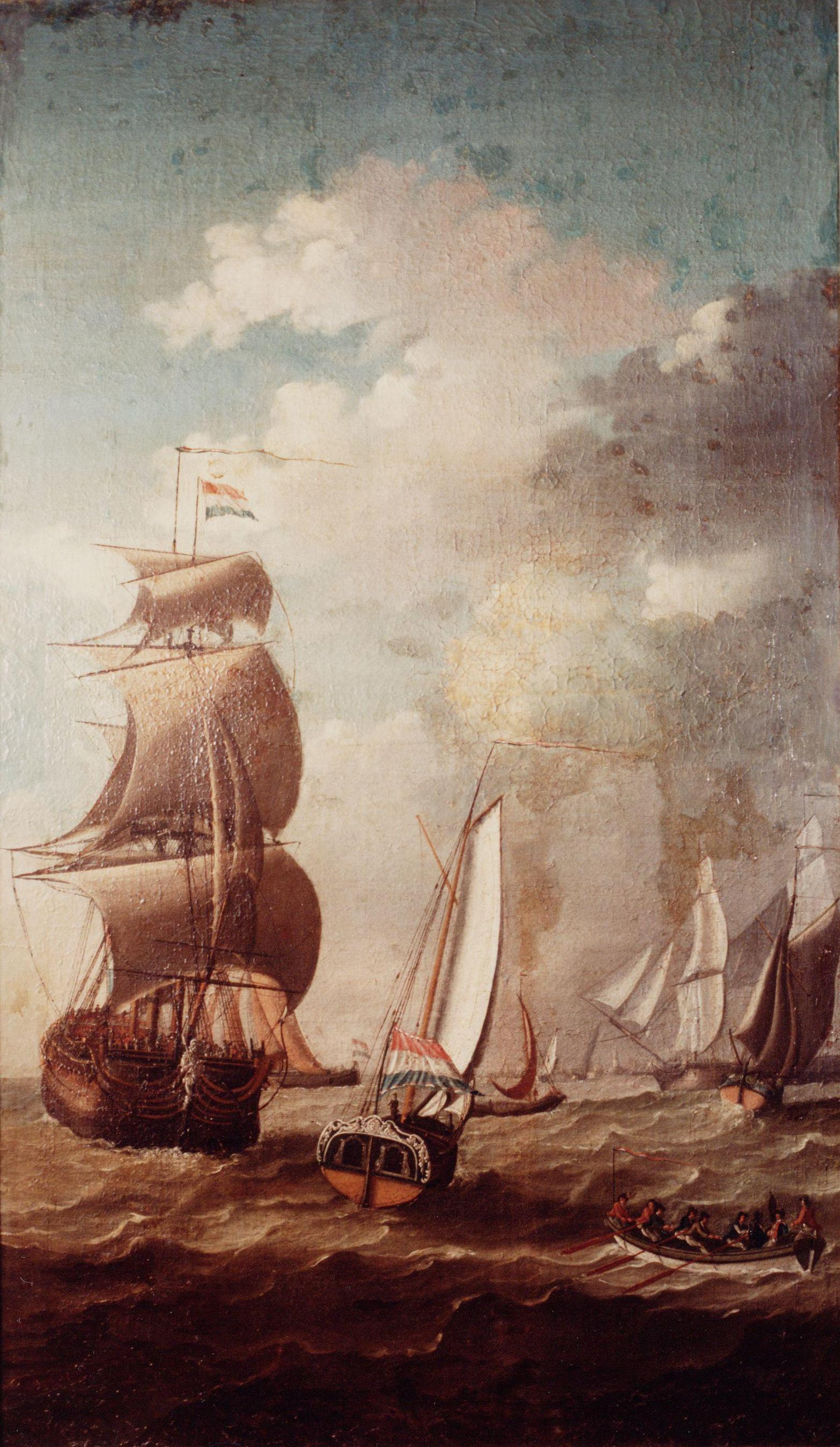
Two boats of the Frisian Admiralty (foreground)

=== Foundation ===
The Dutch Revolt (1568–1648) brought about the need for an improved organisation for the protection of trade, i.e., the sea routes of the new Dutch Republic. Difficulties quickly arose between the different provinces with different views on the design of such organisation. Originally there were three different admiralties: that of Zealand, that of the Southern Quarter of the province of Holland, and that of the Northern Quarter of Holland, with Friesland to be controlled by the latter. In 1587, the Northern Quarter Admiralty established its headquarters at Amsterdam. Quickly a dispute arose between Friesland and this Amsterdam Admiralty over earnings from convoys, over import and export rights, over the financial administration, and because Amsterdam was simply too far away. Consequently, on 6 March 1596, the States of Friesland decided on the "Foundation of a Chamber or Council of Admiralty for this Territory." On 5 May 1597, Hoitze Aisma, Feijcke Tetmans, Sicke van Dijckstra, and Frans Jansz were entrusted with creating the Frisian Admiralty board.

=== Organisational structure ===
On 14 June 1597 the States-General of the Netherlands, the highest confederal executive power of the Republic, approved a proposal in which the foundation of a Generaliteitscollege was decided upon; this replaced an earlier navy board, the Collegie Superintendent, of which Maurice of Nassau, Prince of Orange (Admiral-General since 1588) had been the head, but which had been dissolved in 1593 as a result of disputes between the provinces. The Generaliteitscollege was to be a loose cooperation, itself a mere formality without actual power, between five autonomous admiralties (the Zealand, the Frisian, the West Frisian, the Amsterdam and the Rotterdam) to be represented in it. Each admiralty also had its own hierarchy. The Frisian Admiralty was led by a college responsible for the appointment of civil servants as bailiffs and clerks. Furthermore, the States-General appointed for each admiralty a receiver-general, a secretary, and a public prosecutor. Friesland's admiralty was partly funded by the capital of another province, the city of Groningen (capital of the province of the same name), and so people from Groningen could also be admitted to the admiralty's positions (e.g. Admiral Rudolf Coenders), in return for its providing ships. The Frisian Admiralty was thus founded within a confederal context on 15 August 1597.

=== The Dokkum Era ===
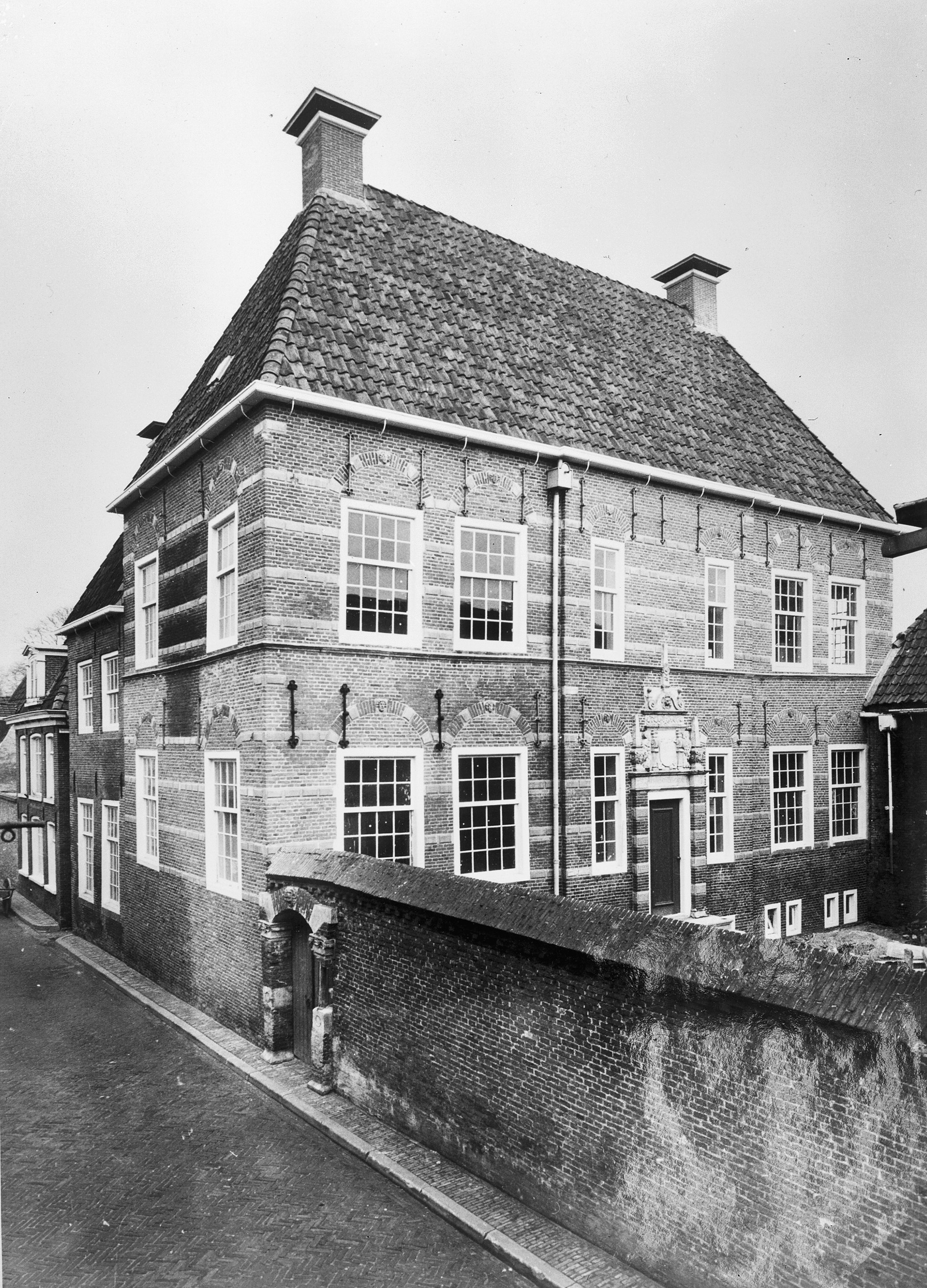
Het Admiraliteitshuis

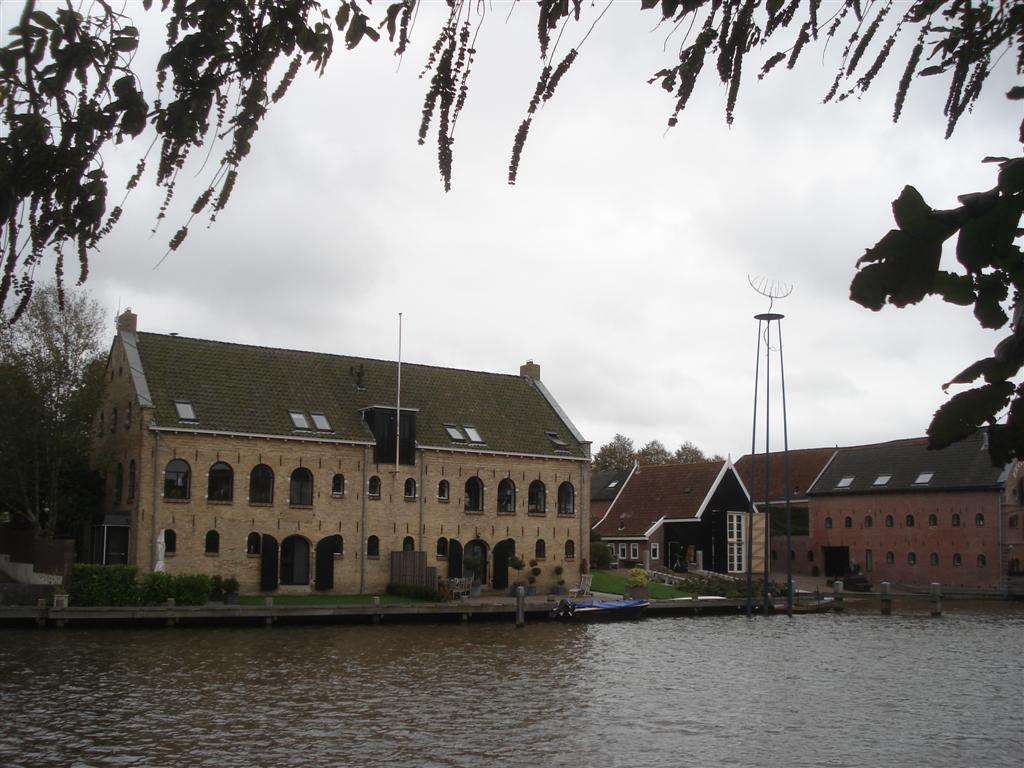
The Admiralty wharf at Dokkum

The Frisian Admiralty was initially housed in the old raadhuis (town hall) on the corner of Hoogstraat on the Lange Oosterstraat in the city of Dokkum. This building had been bought in 1589 by captain Tjaerd Tjebbes for the sum of 900 gold guilders.

The admiralty also took up residence in the Blauhuis, an impressive building with a striking slender tower. The city administration initially paid the rent, but from 1610 this was taken over by the Admiralty.

In 1618 the institution moved to another building, which thereby acquired the name Het Admiraliteitshuis ("The Admiralty House"); it is the location of the present city museum of the same name at Dokkum. Contrary to what might be expected from its name, this museum is not devoted to the maritime past of the city.

The period between the foundation and the Battle of the Downs is little known due to the destruction of the admiralty archives. It appears from a fleet list that at the Battle of Gibraltar Captain Teunis Woltersz was present in command of De Friesche Pinas, though her number of crew and of guns are both unknown.

That employment with the admiralty at Dokkum brought rich earnings is demonstrated by this excerpt from the minutes of an assembly of the States General, in which a captain asks around for payment of reward money promised to him because of courage he has shown:

Kapt.Thoenis Woltersz. asks by request payment of f. 50, = that have been assigned him on 17 December 1609 for courage shown in the battle of Gibraltar, furthermore [he asks] for an instruction to be given to the Adm. at Dokkum that he be readmitted into their service and that until that time he might receive wages. The States decide that the Adm is to pay Woltersz the f. 50, and to take him in service on the first vacancy [of full captain] to become available. For now he will receive an extra-ordinary wage of f. 12, if it appears that he does real service [as an extra-ordinary captain].

=== Battle of the Downs ===
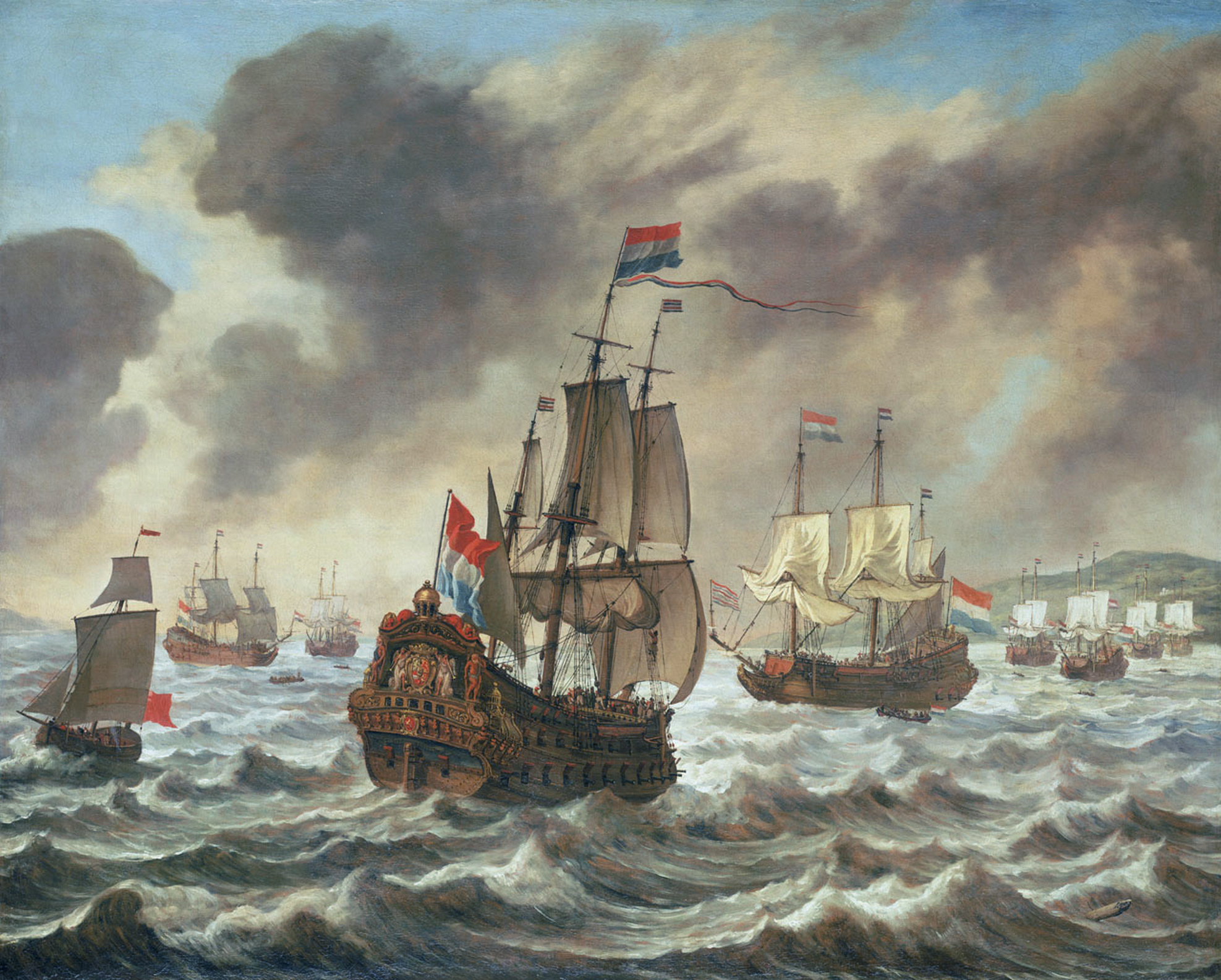
Before the Battle of the Downs, by Reinier Nooms

In 1626 the Frisian Admiralty was exempted from its duty to deliver six warships, suggesting that not all was well in Dokkum financially and administratively. The admiralty, however, came into action under the command of Dutch supreme commander Lieutenant-Admiral Maarten Harpertszoon Tromp during the Thirty Years War to blockade the German Ems and Jade Rivers to prevent privateers working for the Habsburgs to leave port. During this blockade the Frisians even captured the freebooter Du Mortier. In 1639 the admiralty equipped three ships and four yachts for the Republic. A few were sent out on scouting duties in the actions that would lead up to the Battle of the Downs, including a roeifregat (galley) from the Frisian Admiralty, the Rotterdam, under command of Captain Joris Pieters van den Broeck. After it brought back its report, Admiral Tromp decided to give battle on 16 September, with a Dutch fleet of 29 ships against 67 Spanish ships. One of the largest ships in Tromp's fleet was a 70-man frigate with 22 guns under the command of the Frisian captain Tjaard de Groot. In the later Battle of the Downs Broeck defeated a 140-man, 18 gun Spanish galleon.

Van den Broeck found frequent fame in later years. In May 1641 he defeated an 80-man, 12 gun ship from Dunkirk, and in 1642 defeated a 140-man, 20 gun frigate with a ship of only 67 men and 10 guns.

=== Move ===
The Frisian Admiralty at first only built the harbour facilities in Dokkum it thought necessary to equip about nine ketches that were to control the Wadden Sea, not considering it necessary to build facilities that could handle greater numbers of ships. When an actual need for large warships arose later on — normally two larger ships were operational — they simply used the ports of other provinces. For instance, from 1620 until 1636 the admiralty's large warships were equipped at Amsterdam. In 1636, these ships were even briefly stationed in Rotterdam, far away from Friesland. Already in 1631 a vote in the Frisian college had come up to move the Frisian Admiralty to the port of Harlingen, the main reasons being:

The convenient location of the city of Harlingen and other commodities serving the equipment for sea and the defence against sudden enemy attacks.

Harlingen was Friesland's only major sea port and offered obvious benefits as a naval port, if only to secure Friesland's main trade route. Dokkum, in contrast, was land-locked and could be reached only by light ships. Still it took ten years for a commission to investigate the possibilities for a move; it presented its report in 1642. An objection against a move had always been that the connection between the port of Harlingen and the North Sea, the Vlie estuary, lay in the area under control of the Admiralty of Amsterdam. The waters to be patrolled by the Frisian Admiralty were just these between the islands of Ameland and Schiermonnikoog and the coast, and the Eems estuary east of Groningen. Dokkum was ideally situated to serve as a base for light ships for this purpose, the river Dokkumer Ee giving direct access to this area. However, during the 17th century the Dokkumer Ee began to silt up very seriously; the commission feared that in future the river bed could only be kept deep enough at prohibitive costs, concluding that a relocation was inevitable.

A year later, on 18 August 1643, regulations were drafted to organize the move. On 1 March 1644, the definitive decision to move was taken, and over the course of 1645 the relocation took place. The magistrates of Harlingen promised to see to it that the admiralty would get good accommodation in "their" city, expenses to be met by the city. The admiralty had, however, expected to be provided with more buildings—meeting rooms, warehouses, space for prisoners, and housing for servants. The admiralty got a building on the south side of the south harbour. There was a request also for a building on the north harbour. A last admonition was necessary in 1653 before a few warehouses around the Westkerk became admiralty property too.

=== First Anglo-Dutch War ===
At the start of the First Anglo-Dutch War in July 1652, the fleet of the Republic was in state of serious neglect. In 1651 it had been decided to expand the active fleet of 40 ships by activating 36 older warships. One year later it was decided to acquire a further 150 armed merchantmen as a reserve. The Frisian Admiralty did not, however, manage to comply with this first order of 1651, though it punctually met the second command (from 1652) for delivery of 17 ships. For the first time in its history the admiralty had a considerable number of larger warships operational: up to eight were supplied to the national fleet. Each ship was between 120 and 125 feet long and between 27 and 28 feet wide. The ships were manned by 85 sailors and 25 soldiers and armed with between 28 and 30 guns.

At the Battle of Plymouth in 1652, the Frisian Admiralty ships Westergo, Albertina, Schaapherder, Sara, Hector van Troye, and Gelderlandt were present, under command of Commodore Michiel de Ruyter, as well as the Frisian captain Douwe Aukes on board the Dutch East India Company warship De Vogelstruys, which had been added to the national fleet on the outbreak of war, with a crew of 200 heads and 40 guns. Aukes and his vessel, separated from the rest of the fleet, were surrounded by four English ships but when his crew was about to surrender Aukes threatened to blow her up himself if they refused to fight. The crew was so afraid that in the subsequent fight the Dutch forced the English to break off the engagement.

The other admiralty colleges were not always pleased with the behavior of the crew of the ships of the Frisian Admiralty—for example, during this war, one of the Frisian ships sailed home without permission, and after the Battle of Portland the shipmasters Sekema Becks and Allert Jansz were punished for not taking part.

Mainly because of money problems, it was chronically difficult for the admiralty to sufficiently supply its vessels during the war, as was demonstrated in December 1652. Frisian captains Schelte Tjerks Wiglema and Adriaan Brunsveldt had not yet received the funds to feed the crew when Tromp required them to join his fleet. Hastily, Wiglema travelled to The Hague to ask for the necessary money, but this was denied. Ultimately the Dokkumer captain paid for the provisions himself, "from his love for, and to the greater glory of, the Fatherland." Wiglema himself wouldn't eat much of the food, being killed a few weeks after. Understandably, through the lack of money many ships, most of them being older converted merchantmen, were in poor condition. When the Westergo sank in 1653, her hull hadn't been cleaned for eight months.

Near the end of the war, in 1653, the States-General decided, on instigation of the Grand Pensionary of the States of Holland Johan de Witt, to keep a large standing navy during peacetime. This "New Navy" consisted of a professional core of 64 capital ships. Five of these were to be Frisian ships.

=== War in the Baltic ===
When in the Northern Wars Sweden tried to conquer Denmark in an attempt to gain control of the Baltic Sea, the Swedes threatened to inflict great damage on Dutch trade. The Dutch Republic thus began to fear for her trade on the Baltic Sea and sent a fleet led by Lieutenant-Admiral Jacob van Wassenaer Obdam to help the Danes in what became known as the Dutch-Swedish War. The Swedes were defeated in 1658 in the Battle of the Sound. Five Frisian ships took part in this battle, including the Albertina under Captain Auke Stellingwerf and the troop transport Judith under master Tjerk Hiddes de Vries. Stellingwerf, acting on behalf of the admiralty, wintered in Denmark from 1658 to 1659 as did Tjerk Hiddes de Vries, defending Copenhagen against the Swedish attack.

=== Second Anglo-Dutch War ===
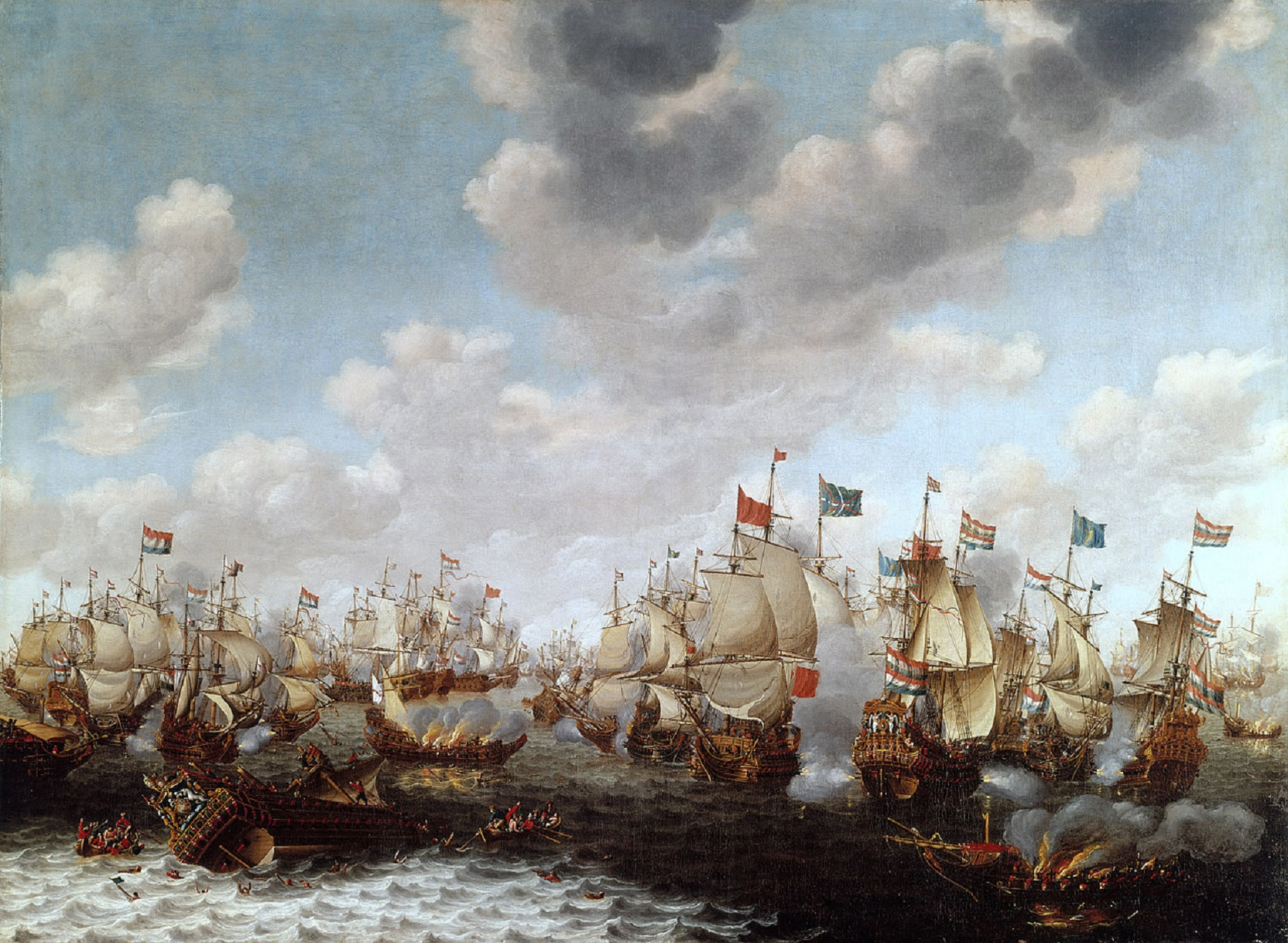
The Four Days' Battle, by Pieter Cornelisz van Soest, painted around 1666

In 1661 the States-General, to compensate losses, ordered the Frisian Admiralty to build three ships (out of eighteen across all the admiralties), and five more in 1664, but none were ever delivered. The States-General became irritated and stated that they were "displeased in the highest possible extent". In response, that same year two Frisian warships were built, the Sevenwolden and the Princes Albertina. The threat of war with England rapidly increasing, the admiralty began to adopt a more active attitude towards ship construction. Ships like the Oostergo (with 225 men and 56 guns) and d'Elff Steden with 175 men and 46 guns were then still seen as sufficiently heavy. However, in the autumn of 1664 the States-General became convinced it had at last become unavoidable to match the English fleet in strength and firepower; in December 1664 they ordered the construction of 24 new and much heavier vessels along with a number of lighter ships, the Frisian share being a fleet of nine vessels with a total crew of 1930 sailors and 416 cannon. In January 1665, a second order of 24 heavy vessels was placed, the Frisian Admiralty having to build three of them and also two yachts, two galiots, two fireships, and an ammunition supply vessel. Now that war was imminent and the Orangist province of Friesland—contrary to the predictions of the English ambassador George Downing—fully participated in the confederal war effort, lack of money was no longer an obstacle, and the admiralty immediately began construction on these ships.

When the Second Anglo-Dutch War finally broke out, the Frisian fleet sailed. In the course of February 1665 the Frisian squadron gathered at the Texel. The crews were mostly recruited among seamen of the merchant navy forbidden to sail their merchant ships until the navy vessels were fully manned. The crew of the Westergo included a Polish sailor, who discovered a way of setting an enemy sail on fire with burning arrows. On 1 May, all the captains were gathered by Lieutenant-Admiral Stellingwerf and given their orders. The next day, however, a contrary wind meant they could not sail out. In the last few days, marriages were hurriedly concluded, for the fleet was to sail on 24 May. The ships Zevenwolden, Groeningen, Prinses Albertine, d'Elf Steden, Westergo, Omlandia, Frisia, De Postillon van Smirna, Hollandia, and Oostergo finally sailed, with a combined crew of 2279 sailors and 700 cannon. The great fleet finally arrived in the North Sea, sinking several English merchantmen. In June, however, the combined Dutch fleet engaged the English in the Battle of Lowestoft and suffered a heavy defeat, Stellingwerf being among the admirals killed. He was succeeded as Lieutenant-Admiral of the Frisian fleet by Tjerk Hiddes.

In 1666, while Lieutenant-Admiral Michiel de Ruyter was supreme commander of the rebuilt and expanded Dutch fleet, Frisian ships were present at the Four Days Battle near Dunkirk. In this battle the English lost ten ships and 2,800 men, compared with the four ships and two thousand man lost by the Dutch. Tjerk Hiddes distinguished himself by his bravery. This was to be the zenith of Frisian naval power, for not six weeks later the Dutch fleet was defeated in the St James's Day Battle with the thirteen Frisian ships being badly mauled. Tjerk Hiddes was mortally wounded, Rudolf Coenders killed.

Still, the next year, 1667, the Frisian Admiralty again equipped eleven larger vessels. It rendered only a modest contribution to the decisive Raid on the Medway — its fleet was initially too late — but such ships as the Groningen (between 276 and 300 crew members and 70 guns), the flagship of the new Frisian operational commander Vice-Admiral Enno Doedes Star, were used to cover the national fleet.

=== Third Anglo-Dutch War ===
In the Third Anglo-Dutch War the Frisian fleet was already markedly diminished in power. As the province was under threat by the army of Bernhard von Galen it couldn't spend much funds on naval activities. As a result, after the initial Battle of Solebay, in which nine Frisian ships were present, the entire Dutch fleet was rather small, despite having to fight the combined Anglo-French force. The Admiralty of Friesland nevertheless provided the following ships and captains for the 1673 Battle of Texel, the last great sea battle of this war:

Ships of the line:
d'Elf Steden 50 (Witzo Johannes Beima)
Prins Hendrik Casimir 70 (Rear-Admiral Hendrik Bruynsvelt)
Groningen 70 (Vice-Admiral Enno Doedes Star)
Oostergo 58 (Jan Janszoon Vijselaer)
Frigate:
Windhond 30 (Jan Pieterszoon Vinckelbos)
Scouting vessels:
Hoop 6 (Cornelis Reindertszoon Eenarm)
Liefde (Jochem Jansen)
"Brander":
Welkomst (IJsbrand Albertszoon)

=== Decline ===
In the years after 1673, the Frisian fleet never recovered. Although the national Dutch fleet continued to grow in strength during the wars between William III of Orange and Louis XIV of France, the Frisians were unable to keep up with developments. In 1685 the entire Frisian fleet consisted of two frigates, and even these were in a poor condition. Between 1672 and 1712 Friesland had just seven naval vessels built. Due to the wars with France, in 1712 the Republic was financially exhausted. Even the rich province of Holland decided to temporarily discontinue warship construction; for much poorer Friesland this situation would basically last well into the second half of the 18th century. As a result, soon after 1715 Friesland was unable to equip even a single larger vessel. To end this situation, between 1728 and 1730 the English shipwright Thomas Davis in Harlingen built the Prins Friso of 52 cannon, to provide the admiralty with a flagship. This was the only major warship constructed in Friesland between 1700 and 1758. In 1740 the frigate Termeer was purchased from the Admiralty of Amsterdam and renamed the Friesland. In the second half of the 18th century a minor Dutch naval renaissance took place with modern warships being built in an attempt to counter growing British naval dominance. Friesland also embarked on a small construction programme. In 1758 Charles Bentham built the Prins Willem (36 cannon), in 1760 wharf master Willem Lodewijk van Genth built the Princesse Maria Louisa (54 cannon), and in 1769 the d'Eendracht (24 cannon) was built. After 1778 production accelerated and fourteen vessels were under construction between that year and 1789, though two of these would remain unfinished.

==== The Harlingen Era ====
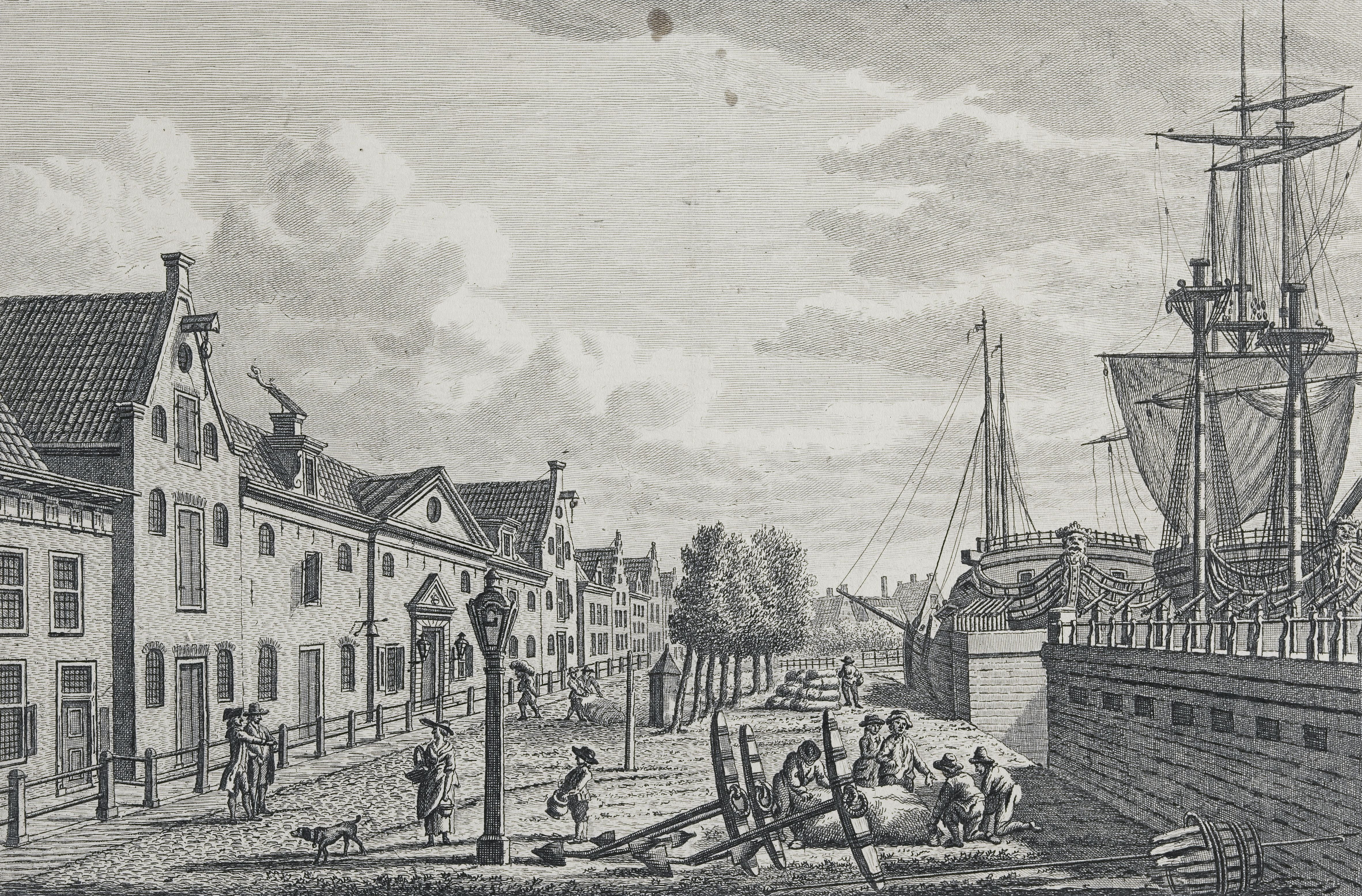
The Admiraliteitsgebouw at Harlingen

The Harlingen period encompassed both the apex and the lowest point of Frisian sea power. At the height of the admiralty, Harlingen had four wharfs. Dozens of warships were launched. This period produced naval heroes such as Tjerk Hiddes de Vries and Auke Stellingwerf, both fatally wounded during naval service—under Dutch conventions, being killed in battle was the mark of a real naval hero. Under the command of Tjerk Hiddes de Vries, during the Second Anglo-Dutch War, the Frisian Admiralty's fleet was at its largest, with no less than forty vessels, large and small.

The Frisian Admiralty in this time also profited from the sale of seized goods and ships. For example, during the Four Days Battle on 13 June 1665, the Nagelboom, a VOC ship taken the previous year by the English during the Battle of Lowestoft, was recaptured by the Frisians. As it was their prize it was also their legal possession, no longer that of the VOC. In an advertisement in the Haerlemse Courant a year later the same ship came up for sale:

The council members of the Frisian Admiralty present to be publicly sold to the highest bidder a capital and distinguished Warship named the Nagelboom, captured by Vice-Admiral Coenders in the latest Battle against the English, complete with Shrouds, Rigging, Sails, Anchors and Ropework, and also a large quantity of Cannon and all further accessories, more broadly specified in the Inventory kept by our Sales Master, that any whom it pleases may there see and inspect. Who has interest may come, on the next 31 July Old Style, in the College of their Noble Mightinesses within Harlingen, at ten o'clock before Noon, and buy according to the Conditions and Articles that can be read in advance by any Bystander from the prescribed Day.

In the 18th century activities were minimal; the short revival later that century was dealt a serious blow when during the night of 12-13 February 1771, the townspeople couldn't prevent a fire laying waste to the building of the Frisian Admiralty in Harlingen. Not only did the vergaderhuis (council hall) and two associated warehouses burn down, but also the entire archive. After this fiasco the admiralty moved to the Havenplein.

The time in Harlingen saw other mishaps as well. In 1781, during the Fourth Anglo-Dutch War, the Frisian Admiralty in Harlingen began building the two largest ships of the line in its history, the 74 gun Vriesland and Stadt en Lande (named after the provinces of Friesland and Groningen respectively), but construction was halted when it was realized, after new soundings, that they were too large to leave port, having too deep a draught to pass the Buitenhaven, the silted exit channel. After several years' indecision as to what to do with them, they were sold for scrap in 1792.

==== The end ====
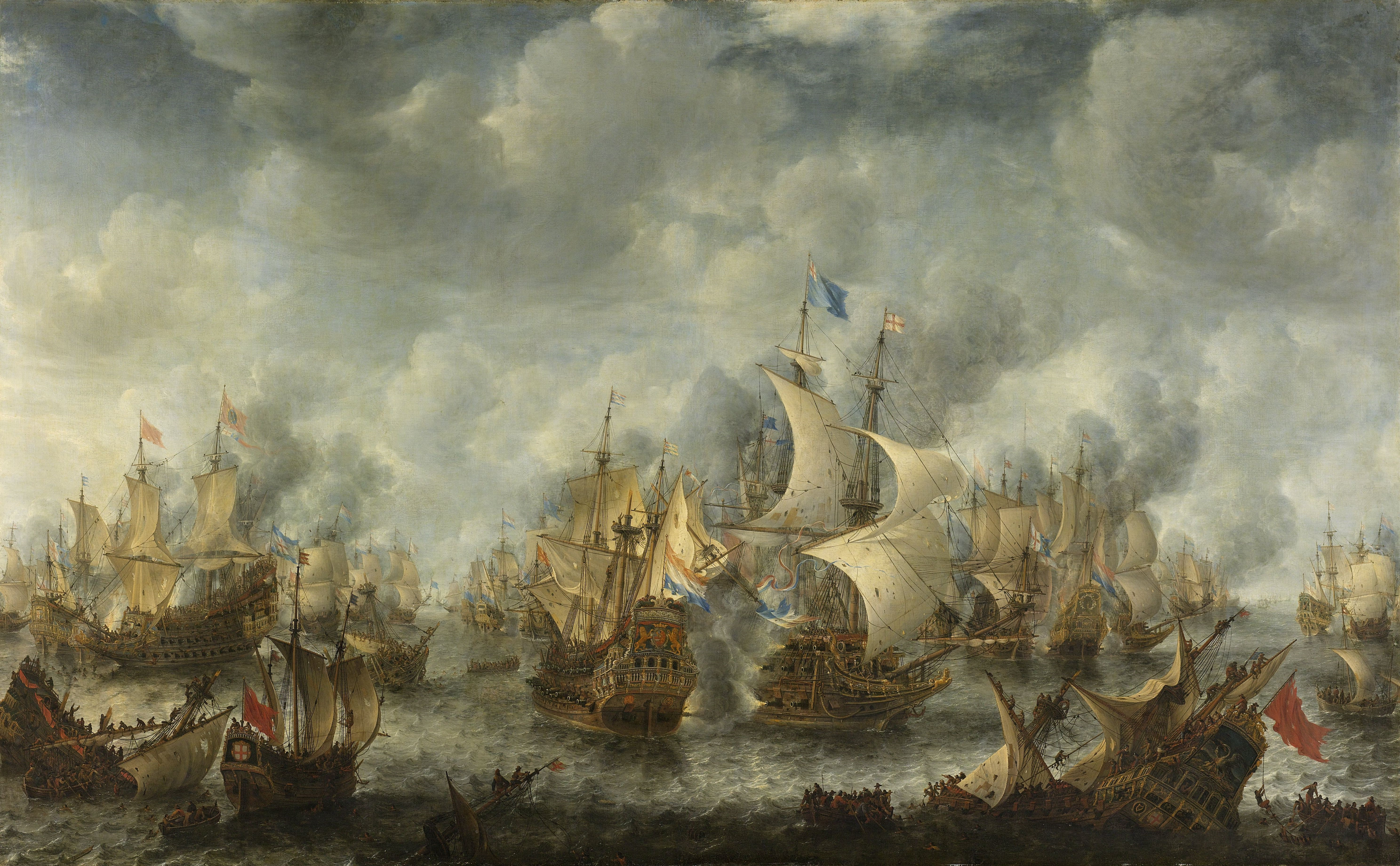
The Battle of Scheveningen, by Jan Abrahamsz Beerstraaten

At the end of the eighteenth century the Frisian Admiralty hit hard times, with Friesland suffering major financial problems. In 1795, during the Batavian Republic, the different admiralties of Netherlands were merged into a central committee to fulfil the wishes of the Patriot, in the context of transforming the Dutch confederation into a unitary state. The admiralty's shipyard, where warships were nearing completion and launch, moved into private hands. The last ship launched by the admiralty was in 1789, the 20 gun Syreene. Few opposed this merger, since the best days of this and the other admiralties were well behind them. The Dutch Navy's dominant role was over forever.

== Sea battles in which it participated ==
Between 1596 and 1792 the Admiralty of Friesland participated in several sea battles, usually as part of a confederate fleet from the five different Dutch admiralties, including also the Admiralty of Zeeland, Admiralty of West-Friesland, Admiralty of Amsterdam and the Admiralty of Rotterdam. In a few cases, it participated in international coalitions. In some sea battles the Frisian Admiralty opted out; sometimes because it was too late to join in, and sometimes because it did not have sufficient funds to raise a fleet, as in most battles of the Third Anglo-Dutch War (since Friesland and Groningen were already under attack from the bishop of Münster, Bernhard von Galen).

- Battle of Gibraltar 1607
- Battle of the Downs 1639
- Battle of Dover 1652
- Battle of Plymouth 1652
- Battle of the Kentish Knock 1652
- Battle of Dungeness 1652
- Battle of Portland 1653
- Battle of the Gabbard 1653
- Battle of Scheveningen 1653
- Battle of the Sound 1658
- Battle of Portland 1663
- Battle of Lowestoft 1665
- Four Days Battle 1666
- St. James's Day Battle 1666
- Raid on the Medway 1667
- Battle of Solebay 1672
- Second battle of Schooneveld 1673
- Battle of Texel 1673
- Battle of Beachy Head 1690
- Battle of Dogger Bank 1781

A few ships of the former Frisian Admiralty fought in the Battle of Camperdown in 1797, under the flag of the Batavian Republic.

== Famous Vlootvoogden ("Fleet Guardians") and other notable officers of the Frisian Admiralty ==
Due to the small initial size of the fleet of the Frisian Admiralty, in its first period no flag officers were appointed, though Van den Broeck functioned as an acting rear-admiral in 1652. This situation lasted until the Second Anglo-Dutch war, when, in 1665, a full hierarchy of three admirals was created. After 1691, however, no vice-admiral was appointed and after 1723 again no flag officers were present at all.

- Aukes, Douwe:
- Aylva, Baron Hans Willem van: luitenant-admiraal (Lieutenant-Admiral) (1667–1691)
- Broeck, Joris Pieter van den:
- Bronckhorst, Frederik Willem van: luitenant-admiraal (1692–1722)
- Brunsveldt, Adriaan:
- Bruynsvelt, Hendrik: schout-bij-nacht (Rear-Admiral) 1665-1675
- Coenders, Rudolf: viceadmiraal (Vice-Admiral) (1665–1666)
- Deketh, Jacobus:
- Groot, Tjaard de:
- Middaghten, Christoffel: schout-bij-nacht (1705–1723)
- Star, Enno Doedes: schout-bij-nacht 1666; viceadmiraal (1666–1691)
- Stellingwerf, Andriesz Pieter: equipagemeester
- Stellingwerf, Auke: luitenant-admiraal (1665)
- Stellingwerf, Frederik:
- Tjebbes, Tjaerd:
- Vries, Tjerk Hiddes de: luitenant-admiraal (1665–1666)
- Vries, Hidde Sjoerds de: schout-bij-nacht (1692–1694)
- Wiglema, Schelte Tjerks:

== Sources, notes and literature ==
- Engels, M.H.H. Admiraliteit in Friesland--Dokkum 1599 (Leeuwarden 1999)
- Hoogeveen, H. Tsjerk Hiddes--Hwat in dekfeintsje wurde kin (Bolsward 1967)
- Roodhuyzen, T. De Admiraliteit van Friesland (Franeker 2003)
- Smits, E. De Friesche Admiraliteit boven water, deel I (Dokkum 1996)
- Smits, E. De Friesche Admiraliteit boven water, deel II (Dokkum 1996)
- Terpstra, Piter Tweeduizend jaar geschiedenis van Friesland (Leeuwarden 1979)
