= Jacobus Deketh =

Dutch States Navy officer (1726–1764)

Captain Jacobus Deketh
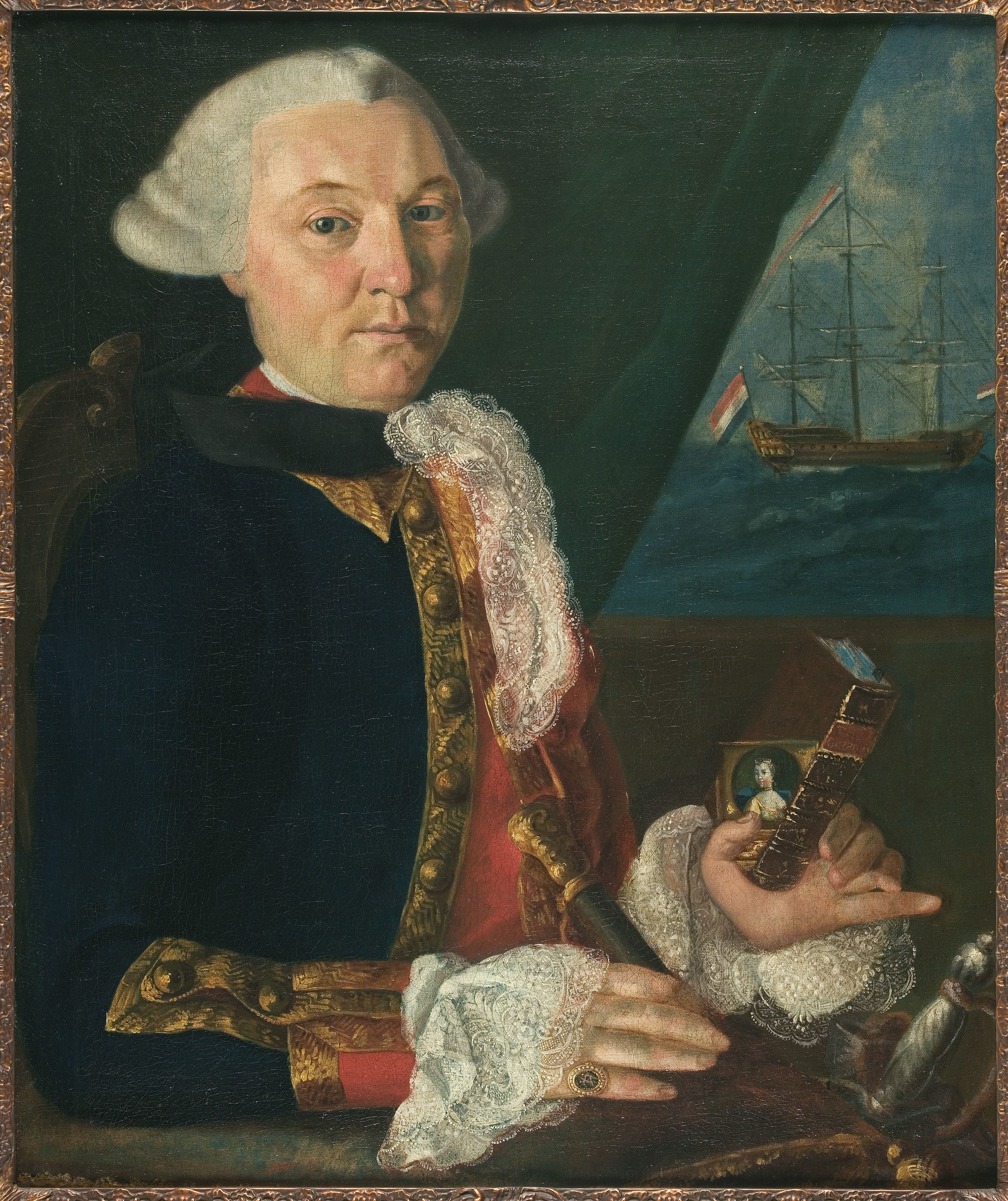
- Jacobus Deketh in 1761, painting in the collection of Frisian Maritime Museum
- Born: Jacobus Deketh; 1726; Harlingen, Dutch Republic
- Died: 26 July 1764 (aged 37–38); Zeewijk (Almenum)
- Relatives: Parents, Jan Deket(h), Anna Goverts Gardin(g)ius
- Military career
- Allegiance: Dutch Republic
- Branch: Admiralty of Amsterdam, Admiralty of Friesland
- Rank: Captain (naval)
- Commands: Prins Willem, frigate

Captain Jacobus Deketh (1726 – 26 July 1764) was a Dutch States Navy officer who was a captain in the Frisian Admiralty, one of the five admiralties of the Dutch Republic. In 1744 at the age of 18, Deketh joined the Admiralty of Amsterdam. He became a lieutenant and later extraordinary captain and sailed to the Dutch East Indies. In 1758, Deketh continued his career in the Frisian Admiralty. He became captain of a ship, Edam. He was appointed full captain of the Frisian Admiralty in 1760.

== Early life and family ==
Jacobus Deketh was the youngest son of Jan Goverts Deket(h) and Anna Gardin(g)ius. On 9 April 1726, he was baptized in the Great Church (Grote Kerk) in Harlingen. He had three brothers: Govardus, born 1717, Reiner, born 1719, and Everhardus, born in 1722.

Although his father's origins are unknown it is likely that he came from Jutland in Denmark. In 1701, his father got a job in the receiver-general's office of the Frisian Admiralty, and in 1721 Jacobus Deketh became receiver-general himself. His mother, Anna Gardinius, was also associated with the Frisian Admiralty, being the widow of Captain Peter Coderq, before becoming the third wife of Jan Goverts Deketh.

== Career ==
In 1744 at the age of 18, Deketh joined the Admiralty of Amsterdam. During his service there he first became a lieutenant and later extraordinary captain and sailed to the Dutch East Indies protecting merchant ships. After 1758, Deketh continued his career in the Frisian Admiralty. He commanded the ship Edam. In 1759 he was appointed full captain and in 1760 he commanded the Prins Willem, a frigate with 36 guns. In this ship he escorted several convoys sailing to Italy, England and France. He made four journeys to the Mediterranean Sea between 1761 and 1763. On behalf of the Dutch Republic he undertook several diplomatic visits to Algiers. He brought gifts with him on these voyages to propitiate the Barbary pirates who at that time made the Mediterranean unsafe.

Deketh died at home in Almenum on 26 July 1764, only 38 years old. His death is recorded on a plaque in the Grote Kerk in Harlingen. Deketh's estate included a stable, orangery, gardening shed, carriage house and farm house. His portrait was painted on 13 July 1761 in Livorno by Ranieri Ducci. In the painting he is surprisingly holding a book with the English title Guardian Volume 1, which during a restoration of the picture was discovered to have been a later pentimento, covering a miniature of a lady. The Fries Scheepvaartmuseum purchased the painting from a man from 's-Hertogenbosch, who was discovered to possess it when he showed it in an episode of Tussen Kunst & Kitsch, the Dutch version of the Antiques Roadshow.
