= Leo Groenewegen (Australian footballer) =

Australian rules footballer (born 1953)

Personal information
- Full name: Leo Groenewegen
- Born: 17 December 1953 (age 72)
- Height: 193 cm (6 ft 4 in)
- Weight: 84 kg (185 lb)

Playing career^{1}
Years	Club	Games (Goals)
1971	North Melbourne	5 (2)
- ^{1} Playing statistics correct to the end of 1971.

Leo Groenewegen (born 17 December 1953) is a former Australian rules footballer who played with North Melbourne in the Victorian Football League (VFL).
