= Jacob Groenewegen =

Dutch merchant

Jacob Groenewegen (died 22 May 1609) was a Dutch merchant, who was the leading merchant (opperkoopman) on the fleet under Pieter Willemsz. Verhoeff that left Texel on 21 December 1607 and arrived in Bantam on 15 February 1609. Like Verhoeff, he died on 22 May 1609, on one of the Banda Islands, in an ambush set up by the islanders.

In that same year, Jacques Specx directed two ships dispatched to establish the first official trade relations between the Netherlands and Japan. These ships, De Griffioen (the "Griffin", 19 cannons) and Roode Leeuw met Pijlen (the "Red lion with arrows", 400 tons, 26 cannons), arrived in Japan on 2 July 1609. The trade pass or shuinjō, was issued on 24 August 1609. The correlation to the Western calendar was made two centuries later by Hendrik Doeff, himself opperhoofd of Dejima from 1803 to 1817, and an anonymous Japanese interpreter. They hypothesized that the person it had been issued to, jiyakusu-kuruun-heike, corresponded not to Specx but to Groenewegen (Dutch pronunciation: [ˈɣrunəˌʋeːɣə(n)]; Japanese medial /w/ was written h at the time). However, since this date postdates VOC records of Groenewegen's death on Banda, recent historians have suggested that jiyakusu-kuruun-heike may actually have been Specx, assuming an abbreviation Corn of his middle name Cornelisz, though this name, pronounced [ʑɑ ˈkɔr(ə)n ˈspɛks], is a poor fit to the Japanese.
