= Laurens Alteras =

Dutch vice admiral

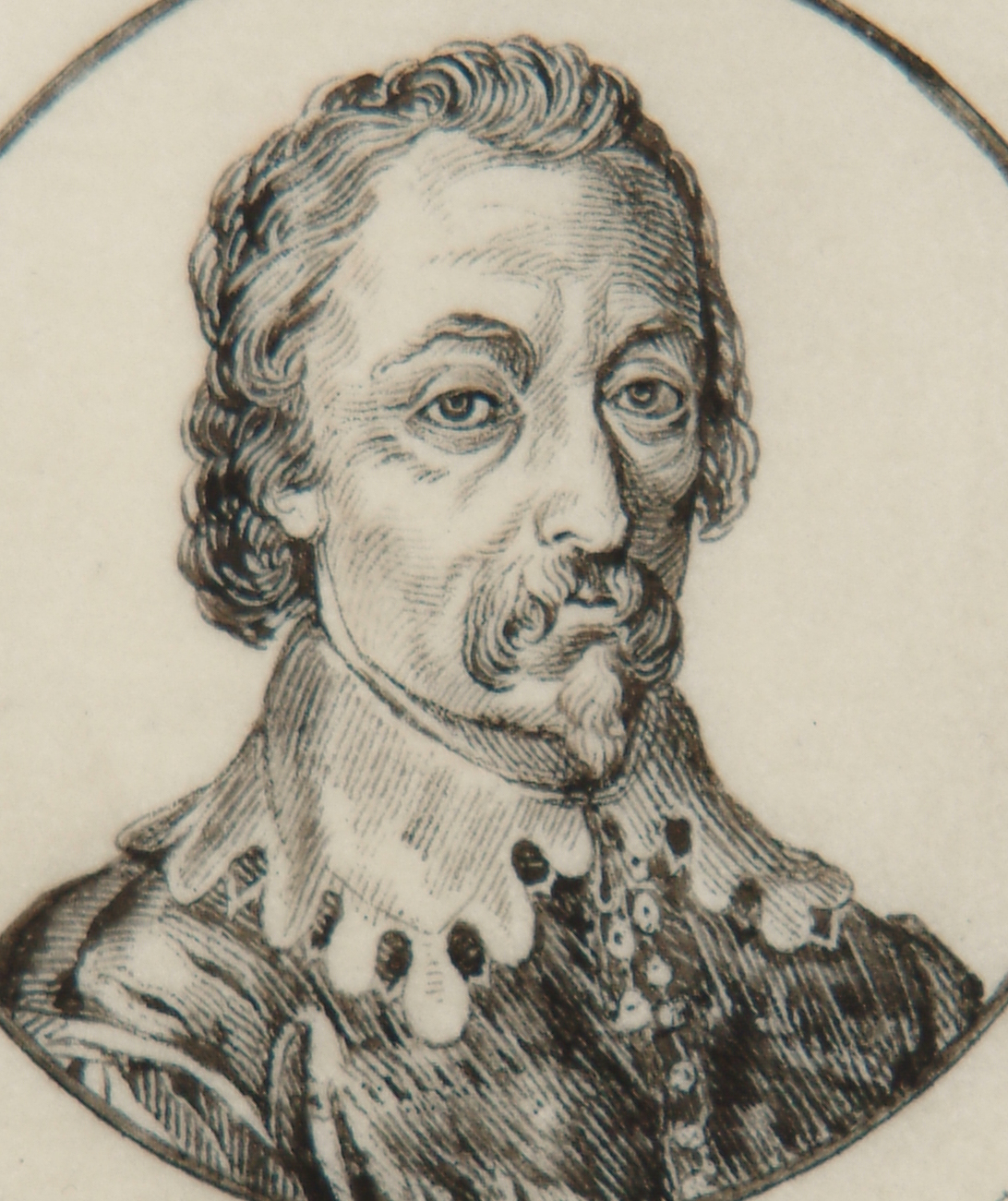
- Born: Laurens Jacobsz Alteras; Vlissingen, Dutch Republic
- Died: 16 October 1622; Strait of Gibraltar
- Military career
- Allegiance: Dutch Republic
- Branch: Admiralty of Zeeland
- Rank: Vice admiral
- Conflict: Eighty Years' War; Battle of Gibraltar (1607)

Laurens Jacobsz Alteras was a 17th-century Dutch vice admiral who distinguished himself as fleet commander under Jacob van Heemskerck in the battle of Gibraltar of 1607.

After the battle and Van Heemskerck's death, he took control of the Dutch fleet. He died on 16 October 1622, having successfully defended a Dutch merchant fleet from an attack by a Spanish armada.

== Bibliography ==
- Boldingh, H., ed. (1911). "Alteras (Laurens Jacobsz.)". Nieuw Nederlandsch Biografisch Woordenboek (in Dutch). Vol. 1. Leiden: Sijthoff. p. 92. OCLC 277609365.
- Van der Aa, A., ed. (1852). "Alteras (Laurens Jacobsz)". Biographisch Woordenboek der Nederlanden (in Dutch). Vol. 1. Haarlem: Brederode. pp. 208–209. OCLC 312812085.
