= Dutch admiralties =

The Dutch Republic had five admiralties:

1. Admiralty of Amsterdam (1586–1795)
2. Admiralty of Friesland (1596–1795)
3. Admiralty of the Noorderkwartier (1589–1795)
4. Admiralty of Rotterdam (1574–1795)
5. Admiralty of Zeeland (1584–1795)

All five admiralties ended in 1795 with the end of the Dutch Republic due to the Batavian Revolution.
