= Bram Groeneweg =

Dutch long-distance runner

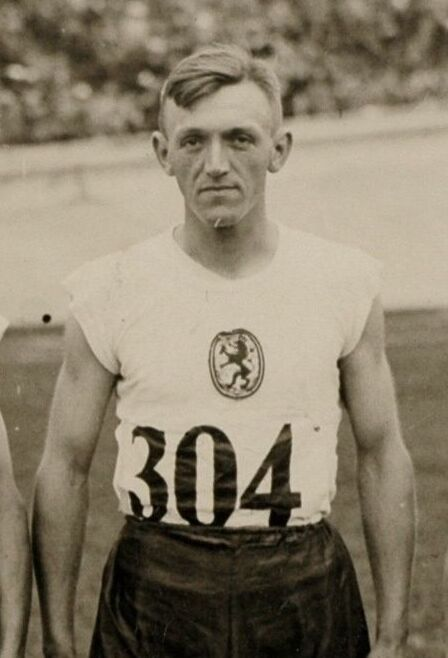
- Groeneweg (1928)

Personal information
- Nationality: Dutch
- Born: 13 March 1905 Spijkenisse, Netherlands
- Died: 24 April 1988 (aged 83) Gouda, Netherlands

Sport
- Sport: Long-distance running
- Event: Marathon

Bram Groeneweg (13 March 1905 – 24 April 1988) was a Dutch long-distance runner. He competed in the marathon at the 1928 Summer Olympics.
