= Simon van Groenewegen van der Made =

Dutch jurist

Simon van Groenewegen van der Made (1613, Delft – 5 July 1652, Delft) was a Dutch jurist.

Born in Delft, he studied law in Leiden, practiced as an advocate in The Hague and was since about 1645 city clerk of Delft. He gained renown as a commentator of Grotius and for his Tractatus de legibus abrogatis et inusitatis in Hollandia vicinisque regionibus, a censura that indicated which parts of Roman law still applied in Holland. It remains the leading work on Roman law in the Netherlands.
