= Gerard Brandt =

Dutch preacher, playwright, poet, historian, and biographer (1626–1685)

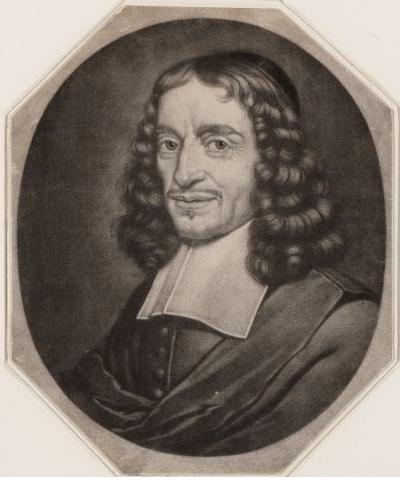
Gerard Brandt in 1683.

Gerard Brandt (25 July 1626 – 12 October 1685) was a Dutch preacher, playwright, poet, church historian, biographer and naval historian. A well-known writer in his own time, his works include a Life of Michiel de Ruyter (1687, Het Leven en bedryf van den Heere Michiel de Ruiter - an important source on the admiral's life) and a Historie der vermaerde zee- en koopstadt Enkhuisen (1666, Geschiedenis van Enkhuizen - still an important source for that city's early history).

== Life ==
Brandt was born and died in Amsterdam, and was the son of the clockmaker Gerard Brandt and his wife Neeltje Jeroens. Aged 17 Gerard junior wrote the play De Veinzende Torquatus, later put on in the Amsterdamse Schouwburg, of which his father was regent. When he later became a well-known preacher and serious scholar, he did not want his youthful works and errors to be remembered. He was best known for his "grafrede" on Pieter Cornelisz. Hooft in 1647, a translation of Jacques Du Perron's eulogy of Ronsard which he had performed by the actor Van Germez. He also continued his own work, in which he was accused of plagiarism in Aen den onbeschaemden letter-dief, a speech in which he called Hooft "the only poet Amstel has produced", a clear attack on Vondel.

== Dutch historian and biographer ==
Under the influence of professor Casparus Barlaeus, and Barlaeus's daughter in particular, Brandt gave up studying watchmaking and in 1652 passed his exam, becoming a Remonstrant preacher in Nieuwkoop. He married Suzanne van Baerle and all three of their sons later became preachers. Brandt worked from 1660 to 1667 in Hoorn, before moving to Amsterdam. One of his huge patrons there was burgomaster Andries de Graeff. In 1676 Admiral Michiel de Ruyter had died and in 1681 his son Engel de Ruyter commissioned a biography of him from Brandt for 400 guilder. Brandt received information for it from de Ruyter's widow and children, but it was left incomplete on Brandt's death in 1685 - Brandt's sons Caspar and Johannes completed it, publishing it as a 1,063 page volume in 1687.

=== Life of Vondel ===
His exhaustive compilation of the works and biography of the Dutch Poet Joost van den Vondel earned him a place in the list of 1000 key texts of Dutch Literature in the DBNL.

=== Life of Admiral Michiel de Ruyter ===
In his work on the biographies of artists, Arnold Houbraken quotes Gerard Brand's biography, relating the anecdote where Willem van de Velde the Elder asked Admiral de Ruyter permission to have a galley row him around for a good view of the proceedings on the evening of the sea battle in 1666, an event known as the Four Days Battle. He wasn't the only artist to paint the scenes of this battle:

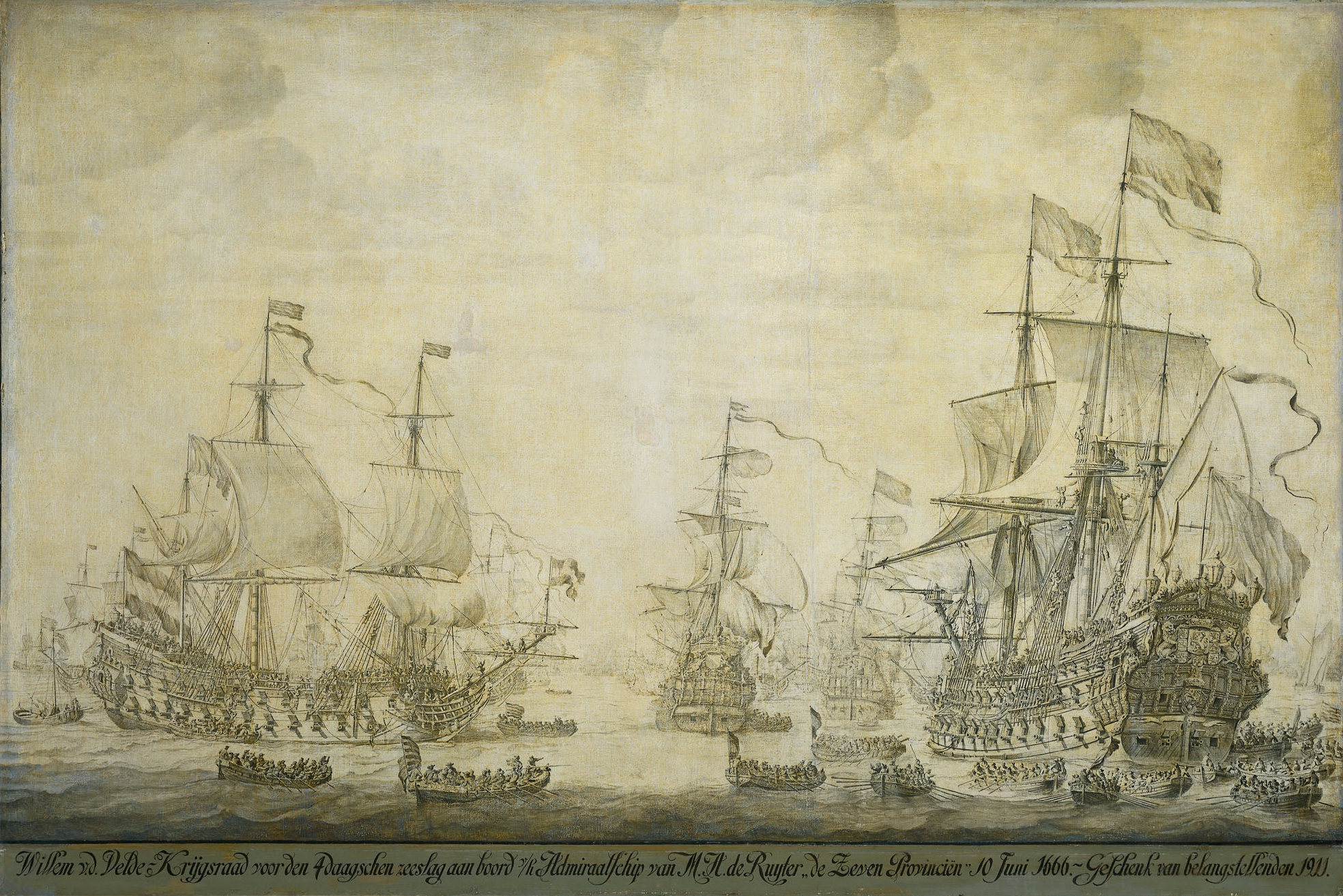
Battle council on the De Zeven Provinciën by Willem van de Velde the Elder, 1666

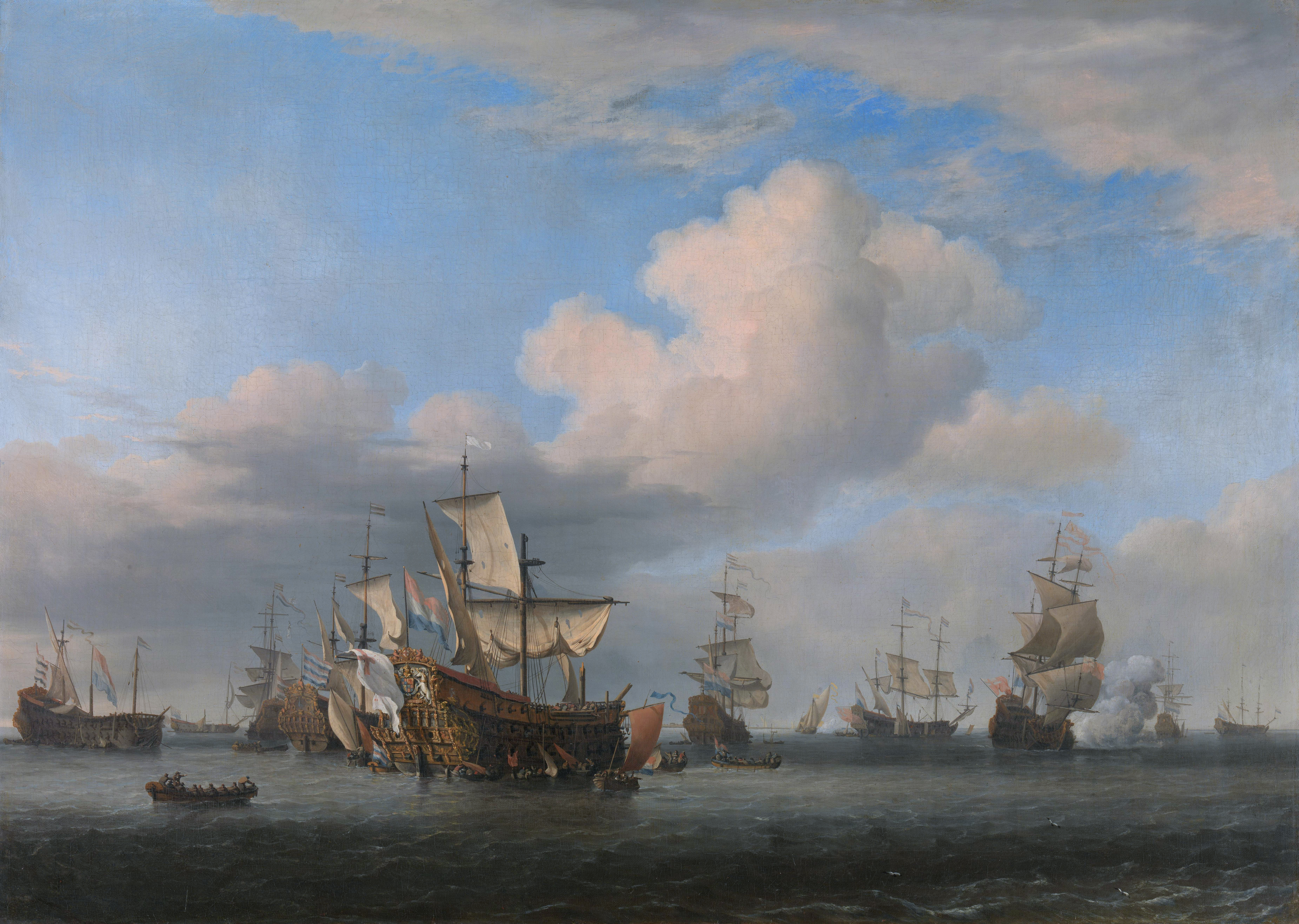
HMS Swiftsure, Seven Oaks and Loyal George captured and flying Dutch colours, by Willem van de Velde the Younger

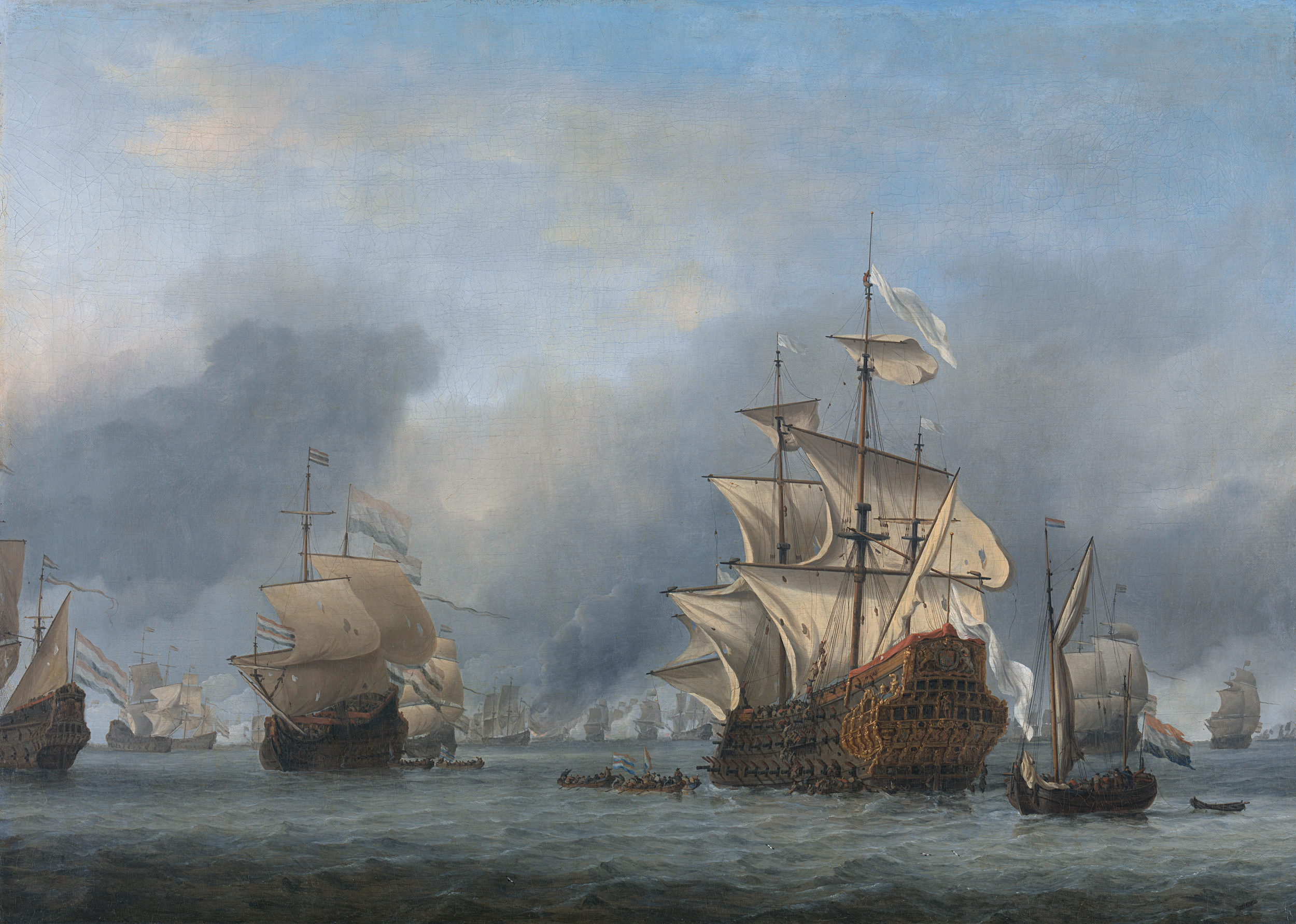
Willem van de Velde: The surrender of the Prince Royal

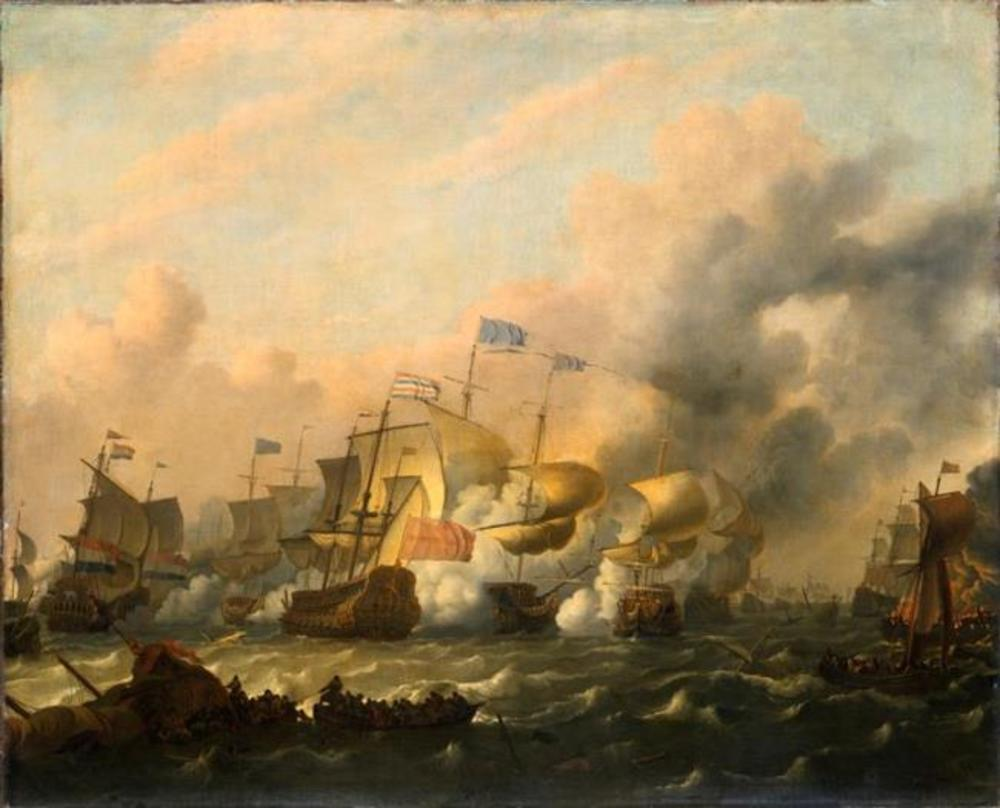
Battle at Texel, August 1673 by Ludolf Bakhuysen

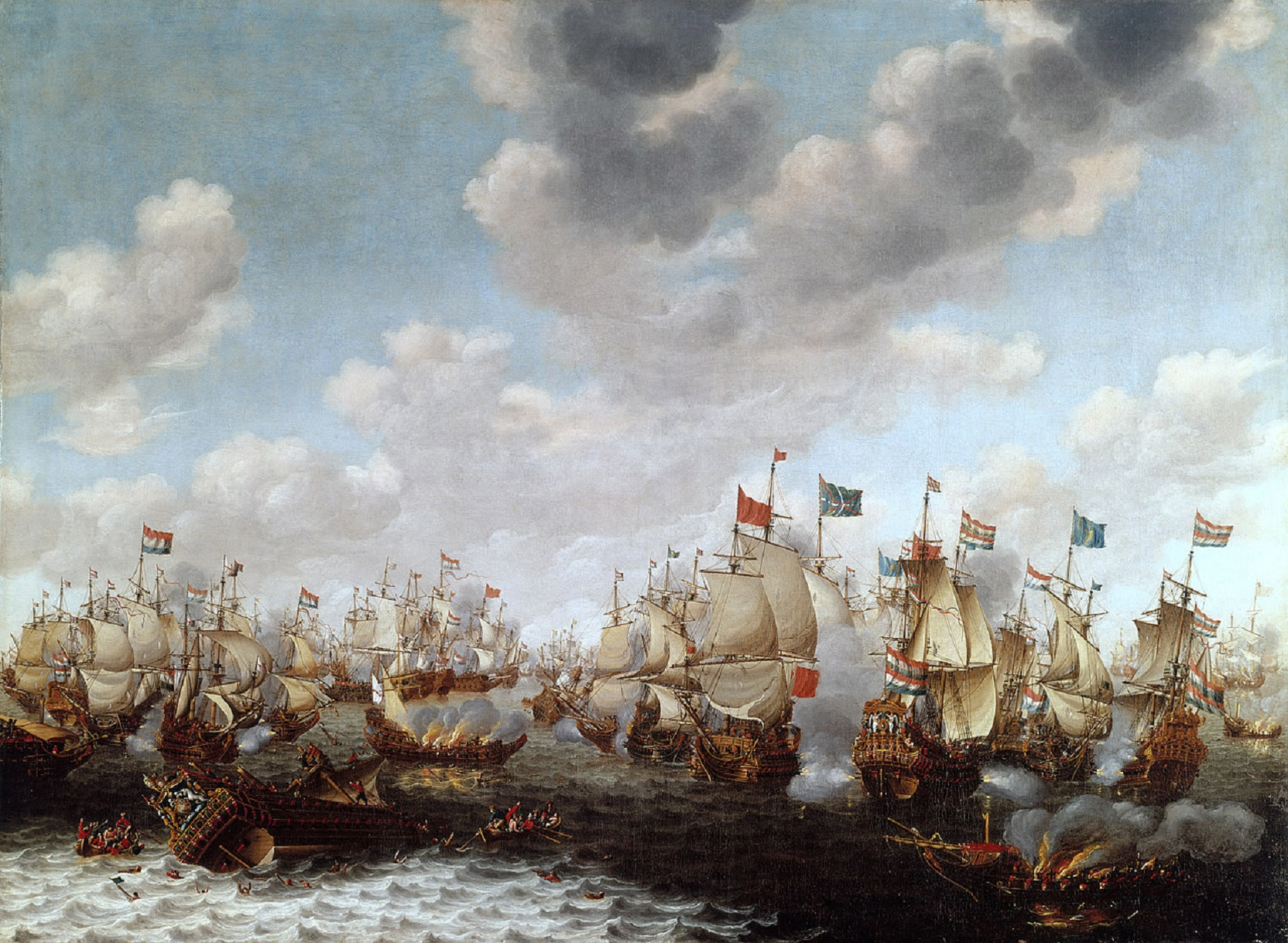
Four day battle by Pieter Cornelisz van Soest

This act later was the reason that van Velde gained his marine commission in London and shows how famous Admiral de Ruyter was in the blind faith that the artists (and the Dutch in general) had in him. Brandt's work became a standard text for students for centuries.

== Works ==
- Stichtelijke Gedichten, 1664
- Historie van de vermaerde zee- en koopstadt Enkhuisen, Amsterdam 1666.
- Leven van Hooft, 1677
- Historie der Reformatie (History of the Reformation - available on Wikisource), 1668-74. An attack on Willem Baudartius, it was itself attacked, especially by Hendrik Ruyl of Rulaeus, Amsterdam, and Brandt had to write an apologia to answer the allegations in 1675
- Leven van Vondel, 1682
- Het leven en het bedrijf van den Heere Michiel de Ruyter. Amsterdam 1687 ISBN 90-6103-401-9 (facsimile-edition)

== See also ==
- Lucretia Wilhelmina van Merken (1721-1789), his great-great grandchild, dramatist and poet
