= Engel de Ruyter =

Dutch naval officer (1649–1683)

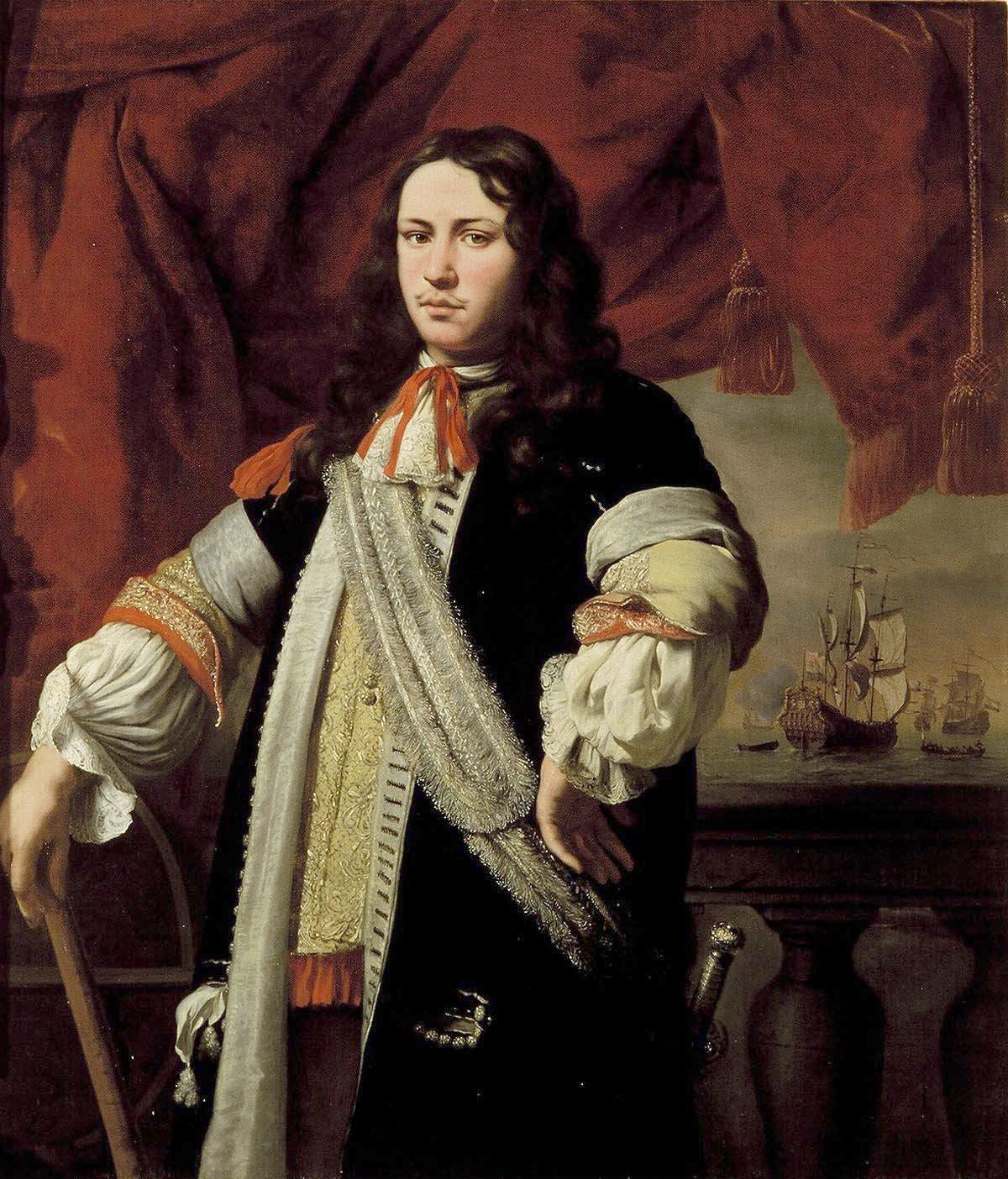
- Engel de Ruyter by Ferdinand Bol (1669)
- Born: 2 May 1649; Vlissingen, Dutch Republic
- Died: 27 February 1683 (aged 33); Amsterdam, Dutch Republic
- Relatives: Michiel de Ruyter (father)
- Military career
- Allegiance: Dutch Republic
- Branch: Navy
- Service years: 1664–1680
- Rank: Vice admiral
- Commands: Deventer, Spieghel
- Conflicts: Second Anglo-Dutch War; St. James's Day Battle; Third Anglo-Dutch War; Battle of Schooneveld; Battle of Solebay; Franco-Dutch War; Battle of Texel; Scanian War
- Awards: Junker and baron in the Spanish and Danish nobility

Engel Michielszoon de Ruyter (2 May 1649 – 27 February 1683) was a Dutch vice-admiral.

== Biography ==
De Ruyter was born in Vlissingen, the son of lieutenant admiral Michiel de Ruyter and his second wife Cornelia (Neeltje) Engels.
He began his naval service on board his father's ship during his expeditions in 1664 and 1665. Captains often had their sons serve with them, so that they learned their trade while their wages were paid by the Admiralty. In 1666, during the Second Anglo-Dutch War, Engel was a midshipman in the Admiralty of Amsterdam. He served in the St. James's Day Battle on board Willem van der Zaen's ship, the Gouda. In 1667, he rose to lieutenant-commander on the Hollandia. On 1 April 1668 he became captain-extraordinary and, in 1669, a captain in ordinary of the Wapen van Leijden, a permanent post.

In 1670, he served under lieutenant-admiral Willem Joseph van Ghent in the expedition against the privateers of Algiers, receiving a reward for his service on that expedition. During the Third Anglo-Dutch War he fought in the Battle of Solebay as captain of the Deventer and was wounded in the chest by a splinter. In the winter of 1672–1673, he also commanded a company of "landmatrozen" on the Dutch Water Line as a major.
In 1673, he was captain of the Waesdorp in the two battles at the Schooneveld and at the Battle of Texel. His change of command was lucky, since the Deventer went out of service after an accident in the First Battle of the Schooneveld. On 6 October 1673, he was promoted to schout-bij-nacht. During the Franco-Dutch War, he was on the 70-gun Spieghel in 1674 during the failed expedition against Martinique. In 1675, he served on convoy escort duty in the Mediterranean and, in 1676, he fought in the fleet sent to help Denmark against the Swedes in the Scanian War. On 19 October 1678, he was made vice-admiral and commanded a squadron in the fleet under Cornelis Evertsen de Jonge which was sent to help Spain, fighting the French admiral Châteaurenault.

Not as austere as his father, Engel commissioned a biography of him from Gerard Brandt in 1681 and made his father's logbooks more accessible by writing summaries of them. Like his father, he was promoted within the Danish and Spanish nobility, rising to the title of junker and later baron – in the Netherlands, he was also known as ridder. In 1680, he bought an estate in Breukelen, naming it the Ruytervegt. He never married and died childless at the age of 33.
