= Raid on Newfoundland (1665) =

- Part of the Second Anglo-Dutch War
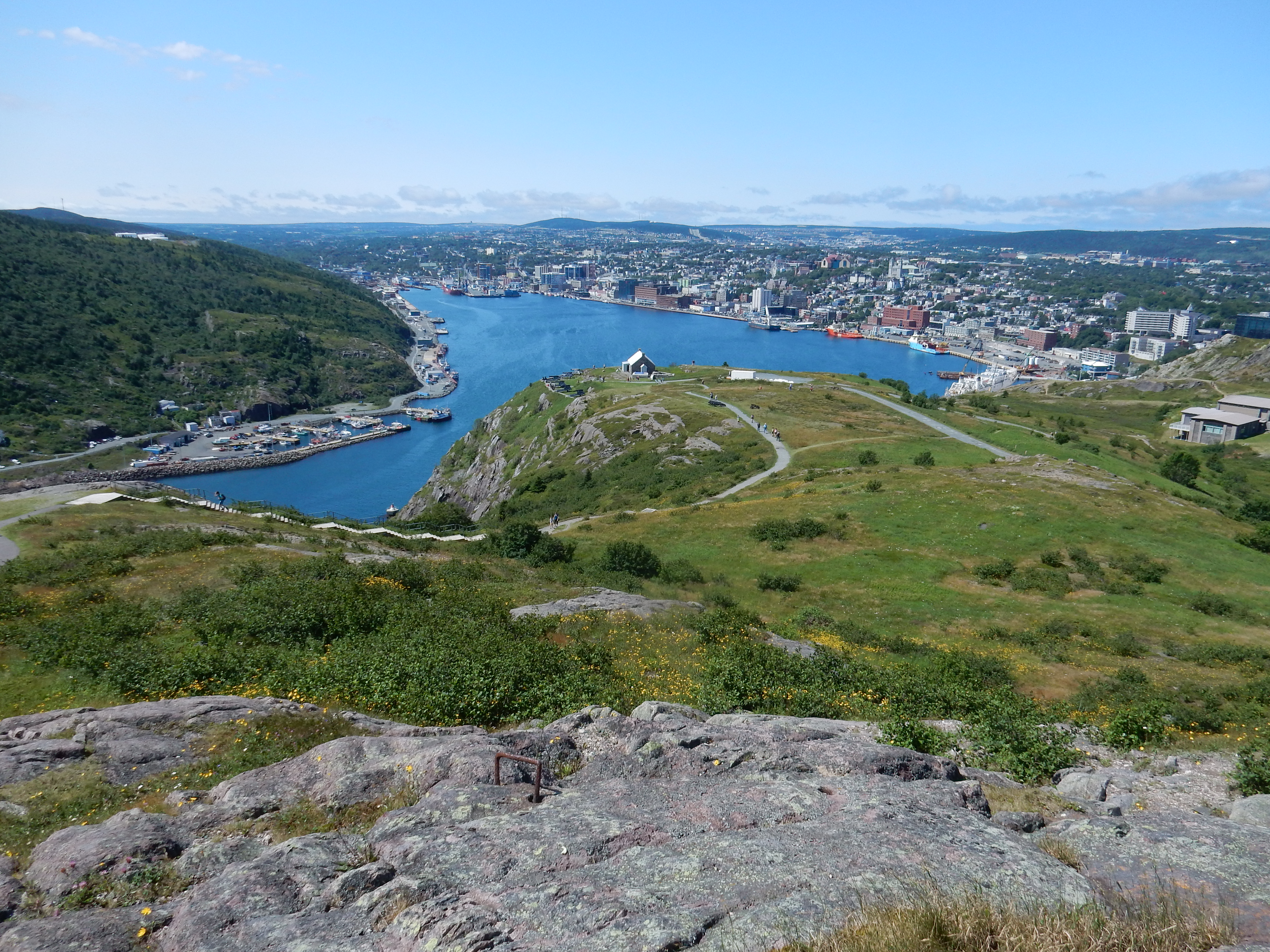
- Present day St. John's
Date	June 1665
Location	St. John's
Result	Dutch victory: St. John's captured

Belligerents
Dutch Republic	England: Newfoundland

Commanders and leaders
(Dutch Republic) Michiel de Ruyter	(England) Christopher Martin

Strength
20 ships	Fortifications and defences of St. John's, and a coalition of planters and migratory fishermen

Casualties and losses
None	All ships taken, fort and houses destroyed, and goods, cannons, and guns taken

In June 1665, after the Second Anglo-Dutch War broke out, a fleet under Michiel de Ruyter sailed to Newfoundland, where he raided the place and damaged the colony severely.

== Background ==
De Ruyter first set sail to the Barbary coast to capture Barbary pirates, then later went to Algiers to free Christian slaves. He continued patrolling in the Mediterranean Sea until he got secret orders from the States-General to recapture forts in West Africa, as well as harm the English colonies in the Americas.

== The Raid ==
After recapturing the colonies in West Africa, he set sail for Newfoundland. He divided his fleet into three, one was sent to Bay Bulls while he himself went to St. John's (where he first had to break a massive cable across The Narrows). He sent the third part of his fleet to Petty Harbour.

In Petty Harbour, they captured two English ships filled with salt, oil, and wine. On the other hand, De Ruyter captured one frigate and a fluyt. They stayed for a while capturing numerous English ships and vessels filled with bread, meat, peas, and fish. After these captures, De Ruyter had around 300 prisoners. He freed some on the island in fear of rebellion. Yet, this was not the only port he raided; he sailed around the coast and attacked numerous ports in the colony, causing significant damage.
