= Battle of Barbados (1665) =

- Part of the Second Anglo-Dutch War
Date	29 April 1665
Location	Barbados, Caribbean Sea 13°05′N 59°37′W
Result	English victory

Belligerents
Dutch Republic	England

Commanders and leaders
Michiel de Ruyter	Francis Willoughby

Strength
13 ships 2,500 sailors & soldiers	Various shore defenses

Casualties and losses
400 casualties, many ships damaged	12 merchant ships destroyed 3 killed & 10 wounded

The Battle of Barbados also known as the Action of Carlisle Bay was a military action that took place off the Caribbean island of Barbados on 29 April 1665 just before the outbreak of the Second Anglo-Dutch War. It was fought between an English force defending against an attacking Dutch force led by Michiel de Ruyter. Although De Ruyter destroyed much of an English convoy at Carlisle Bay his fleet was severely damaged and was unable to launch an invasion of the island.

== Background ==
English attacks on Dutch convoys and colonies had taken place in 1664, most notably the Conquest of New Netherland. In response the Dutch fitted out an expedition later in October, consisting of twelve battle ships under the command of the celebrated Admiral Michiel de Ruyter. The expedition was to be directed against British possessions. Whilst on route, war was declared by both sides on 4 March 1665.

== Battle ==
On April 29 de Ruyter's fleet arrived off Barbados intending to invade the island. First he had to neutralize the forts and the English warships in the area. Early in the morning de Ruyter rounded the point and entered Carlisle Bay and saw twenty nine merchant ships that lay in the bay.

Barbados had however been pre warned about the impending attack and were well prepared, led by Governor Francis Willoughby. Most of the merchant ships were empty as the goods were loaded ashore. As de Ruyter entered the bay the forts and guns along with the guns from some armed merchant vessels opened fire. After an hour and a half de Ruyter had destroyed much of the English convoy, but heavy fire from the defences had caused heavy damage to De Ruyter's fleet in particular his flagship Speigel with nine men killed and 22 wounded. Unable to dent any of the defences he decided to give up the attack and withdrew from the bay with much difficulty.

== Aftermath ==
De Ruyter managed to withdraw to the neutral French port of Saint-Pierre at Martinique for repairs, arriving there on 1 May. His fleet was so damaged that he was unable to attack English held New York.

A year later Willoughby on notification of the French having joined the Dutch side sent an expedition from Barbados against the small French garrison at Saint Lucia and captured the place establishing a short-lived English colony there.
