= De Ruyter's expedition to West Africa =

Expedition to West Africa (1664–1665)
- Part of the Second Anglo-Dutch War
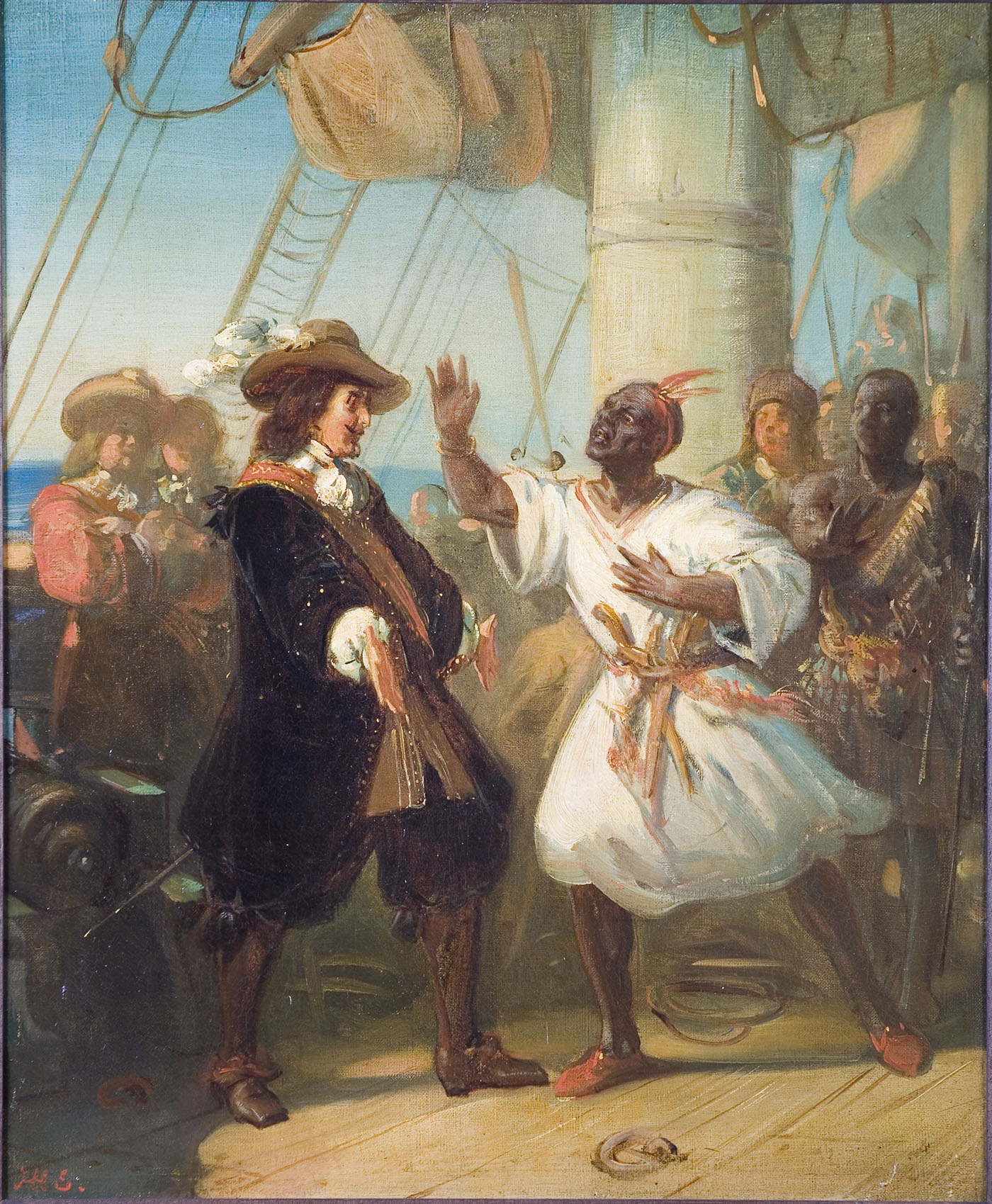
- Michiel de Ruyter hugging his (probably mythical) old friend Jan Kompany, by Johannes Hinderikus Egenberger
Date	October 1664 – February 1665
Location	West Africa
Result	Dutch victory: All forts retaken, and some more captured, except 2; Near bankrupcty of Royal African Company

Belligerents
Dutch Republic	England: Royal African Company

Commanders and leaders
(Dutch Republic) Michiel de Ruyter	(England) Sir George Abercromby (surrendered) (England) Francis Selwyn † (Note: He killed himself to avoid capture)

Strength
12 Warships; 1 Fluyt; 1 Cargo ship Great number of natives auxiliaries	Unknown

After England launched an expedition to conquer Dutch forts in Africa, Michiel de Ruyter was sent to recapture them all, he succeeded and even captured extra English forts.

== Background ==
The First Anglo-Dutch War had just ended and England and the Dutch Republic were finally at peace. However, the Dutch were tired of Barbary pirates attacking their ships, so they sent an expedition under Michiel de Ruyter with 12 warships, 1 fluyt, and 1 cargo ship. There were also 3 merchant ships who sailed along to for protection. He met multiple English ships but they both saluted each other's flags, and everything went according to plan. He then anchored at the Bay of Cádiz. In early June, the Dutch fleet departed for Málaga and arrived on June 4. During the voyage, De Ruyter fell seriously ill, The fleet briefly stayed in Málaga before continuing to Algiers, reaching their destination on June 19. He arrived at Algiers and freed a number of slaves. On July 5, the fleet set course for Alicante. In Alicante, de Ruyter got a warning from the Amsterdam Admiralty about being careful with the English to avoid war. In the ensuing weeks, de Ruyter conducted patrols in the region between Cádiz and Alicante, closely monitoring the movements of Vice Admiral John Lawson's English fleet. Any subsequent encounters with the English were handled diplomatically. On September 1, the fleet returned to Málaga. De Ruyter received letters from the States General and the Amsterdam Admiralty, which said that there would be a Second Anglo-Dutch War. Admiral de Ruyter received secret orders from the States General and Amsterdam Admiralty. Secretary De Wildt urged him to keep the information confidential, especially from Spanish authorities. De Ruyter could only reveal the purpose of the journey change to his crew after passing Gibraltar. He was to respond with a receipt confirmation only, avoiding any mention of the secret orders. The States General learned of an English fleet, led by Holmes, attacking Dutch West India Company (GWC) ships in West Africa during peacetime. Dutch trading posts, including Goeree, were also occupied, causing frustration. Despite the attack being on a private company and not a direct aggression against the state, the States General felt obligated to support the West India Company due to its past services. (Note: Initially, the plan was to assemble a special fleet and send it to West Africa. However, this would have taken considerable time, so it was decided to redirect de Ruyter and his fleet from the Mediterranean Sea to Cape Verde and the Guinea coast instead.)

== Expedition ==
On October 21, the fleet reached Cape Verde after passing through the Canary Islands incognito. On October 22, near Goeree Fort, they encountered eight English merchant ships with a warship flying the Royal African Company flag. Despite English claims of innocence, Admiral de Ruyter reminded them of the existing peace with England, not the Royal Company, due to prior issues in the region. The English ships surrendered their cargo to the Dutch and could seek compensation from the GWC. De Ruyter allowed them only one day, despite their request for ten days of grace. Governor Sir George Abercromby accepted and handed over the fort to the Dutch. Among the captured ships was Isaac Taylor's 'Royal Commission,' leading to his imprisonment in the Tower of London due to the loss of his ship and cargo. While on his way to depart he visited a small village and by met an old friend of him Jan Compagnie. On November 6, 1664, the fleet sailed to the Guinea coast. Unfavorable weather near the equatorial doldrums caused water and food shortages. They returned to Sierra Leone for supplies. Navigating river estuaries was difficult due to limited experience and lack of maps. On December 4, they reached the Bay of Freetown. In commemoration of their visit, both leaders engraved their names on the De Ruyter Stone, which reads: "M. A. DE RUITER – I. C. MEPPEL 1664". Nearby, the Dutch fleet learned that an English family, a man, woman, and two daughters, were held as slaves higher up the river. The War Council decided to seek "satisfaction." Admiral De Ruyter, along with smaller ships from the fleet, sailed up the river. At the English trading post, they were informed that the woman had died, and the man and his daughters had fled into the jungle. Captain Willem van der Zaen, commanding the ship "t Geloof," sent a boat into the inland to search for them. The following day, the boat returned with the three Dutch captives on board. The man was identified as Gysbert Hendricksz from Utrecht. They had been aboard the captured ship "De Bril" and had been mistreated by the British. In response to the English conduct, De Ruyter and the War Council decided to seize all goods from the English trading settlement as punishment. The journey continued through the doldrums with little wind and cautious navigation. Land was spotted on December 28, the Pepper Coast (present-day Liberia). Surrounding the ships were canoes with trade goods, but De Ruyter sailed on to save time. On January 4, 1665, they passed Cape Tres Puntas on the Gold Coast. Near Boutrou (Fort Bodesteijn), GWC officer Rietbeeck boarded the fleet. They decided to proceed to Tacorary (modern-day Takoradi, also known as Fort Witsen), another fort held by the English.

An attempt to send a negotiator ashore failed as the English fired upon them. The War Council decided to launch a large-scale operation. A force of 431 men, led by Count Johan Belgicus van Hoorne and Captains van Nes, Swart, and Eland du Bois, was sent ashore. The English put up weak resistance, but hordes of local tribesmen attacked the Dutch. Soon, the Dutch gained the upper hand and captured the fort, where they found only thirteen sick Englishmen.

The fort was temporarily garrisoned by fifty men. The next day, around 200 or 300 canoes sent by Governor Valkenburg from Elmina, the primary Dutch stronghold in the area, appeared. Two GWC officers brought a letter from Jan Valckenburgh advising the destruction of Fort Tacorary. With each of the twelve ships contributing a keg of gunpowder, they blew up the fort under De Ruyter's supervision. Meanwhile, the black auxiliary troops wreaked havoc on the tribes that had collaborated with the English. When the English prisoners were brought back to the ships, they had to be vigorously defended against the vengeful actions of the auxiliary troops. The fleet then set course for Elmina, the most crucial GWC establishment in West Africa, arriving on January 7, 1665, at the harbor of the trading settlement. De Ruyter received information about an approaching English fleet under Prince Rupert, and the States General's preparation of a fleet under Commander Jan van Campen. De Ruyter was ordered to capture or destroy English ships. The letters were dated October 21, 1664, taking ten weeks to reach him. Two seized ships, Victoria and St. Martha, were immediately converted into Dutch fire ships. The question arose: who would arrive first, Jan van Campen or Prince Rupert?

Governor Valkenburg suggested attacking Cormantijn, (Note: While on the way there they captured multiple other English forts and trading posts as well) a strong English fort and negotiated with the Fanti tribe to make them allies. A landing force of one thousand men, led by Count Jan van Hoorne and Captains Sweers, 't Hoen, Jan van Nes, and Swart, along with twelve hundred pro-Dutch natives, was formed. The attack began on February 6, with a fierce battle leading to victory for the Dutch.

Cormantijn was taken, and the pro-English blacks were attacked by the arriving Fantijn tribe. The English panicked and sought protection from the Dutch against the furious locals. Jan Kabesse, the pro-English leader, attempted to blow up the fort but was unsuccessful. The governor killed himself to avoid capture. The plundering, permitted by de Ruyter, followed. The Dutch discovered various valuables, including gold rings, during the looting.

== Aftermath ==
After the plundering, the crew indulged in drinking, as the English fort had an ample supply of Spanish wines, brandies, beers, and other spirits. Containing the rowdiness proved to be a challenge, but de Ruyter's strong personality quickly restored order when he personally went ashore. By February 11, everything was back to normal. De Ruyter left 52 crew members, 10 GWC personnel, and 10 blacks at Cormantijn, with plans for GWC personnel to replace the ship's crew soon.

The fleet sailed back to Elmina, bypassing the small Fort Asjan, located between Mauree and Cormantijn, assuming it would collapse being enclosed between Dutch forts. On February 12, the fleet anchored at Elmina.

New orders arrived on February 13, brought by an advisory vessel from the States General. It informed De Ruyter that Commander van Campen would not be arriving with his ten ships, and neither would Prince Rupert with his eighteen ships, as he had to remain in English waters under the Duke of York. A later letter, dated December 12, reported that the English had captured Dutch ships in Europe and mentioned "hostile aggressions" in New Netherland. De Ruyter was instructed to collaborate with Valkenburg to capture as many English forts as possible in retaliation against England. Afterward, he was to inflict damage on English possessions in Barbados, New Netherland, Terreneuve (Newfoundland), or other islands and places. Instead of returning to Cádiz as initially planned, he was to sail north of Scotland and return to the Netherlands. Fort Corso and Fort Asjan were left behind, with the English also evacuating Fort Asjan, making Cormantijn no longer needing soldiers. De Ruyter left 42 volunteers in Elmina to support Valkenburg, to be assigned to various forts under the GWC. The fleet was rapidly prepared for the journey, loading a substantial amount of gold, partly as compensation for the looted goods and partly for transportation to the GWC in Amsterdam. The crew received an advance on the spoils. On February 27, Governor Valkenburg hosted a farewell feast for the ship's officers, though De Ruyter couldn't attend due to scarlet fever. That same evening, the anchors were lifted, marking the beginning of a new chapter in Michiel de Ruyter's longest journey.
