= Willem van der Zaan =

Dutch Admiral (1621–1669)

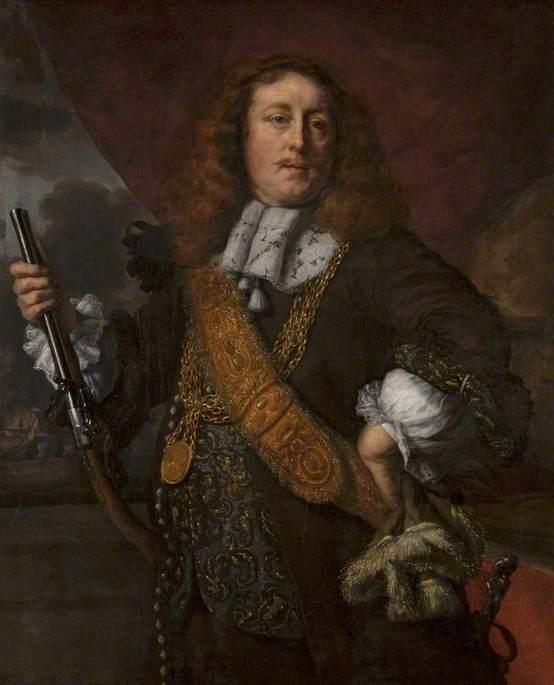
- Portrait of Willem van der Zaan by Bartholomeus van der Helst
- Born: 29 June 1621; Amsterdam, Netherlands
- Died: 17 March 1669 (aged 39); Cape Tres Forcas, Morocco (at sea)
- Burial place: Oude Kerk
- Spouse: Agatha van der Eyck
- Military career
- Allegiance: Netherlands
- Rank: Admiral

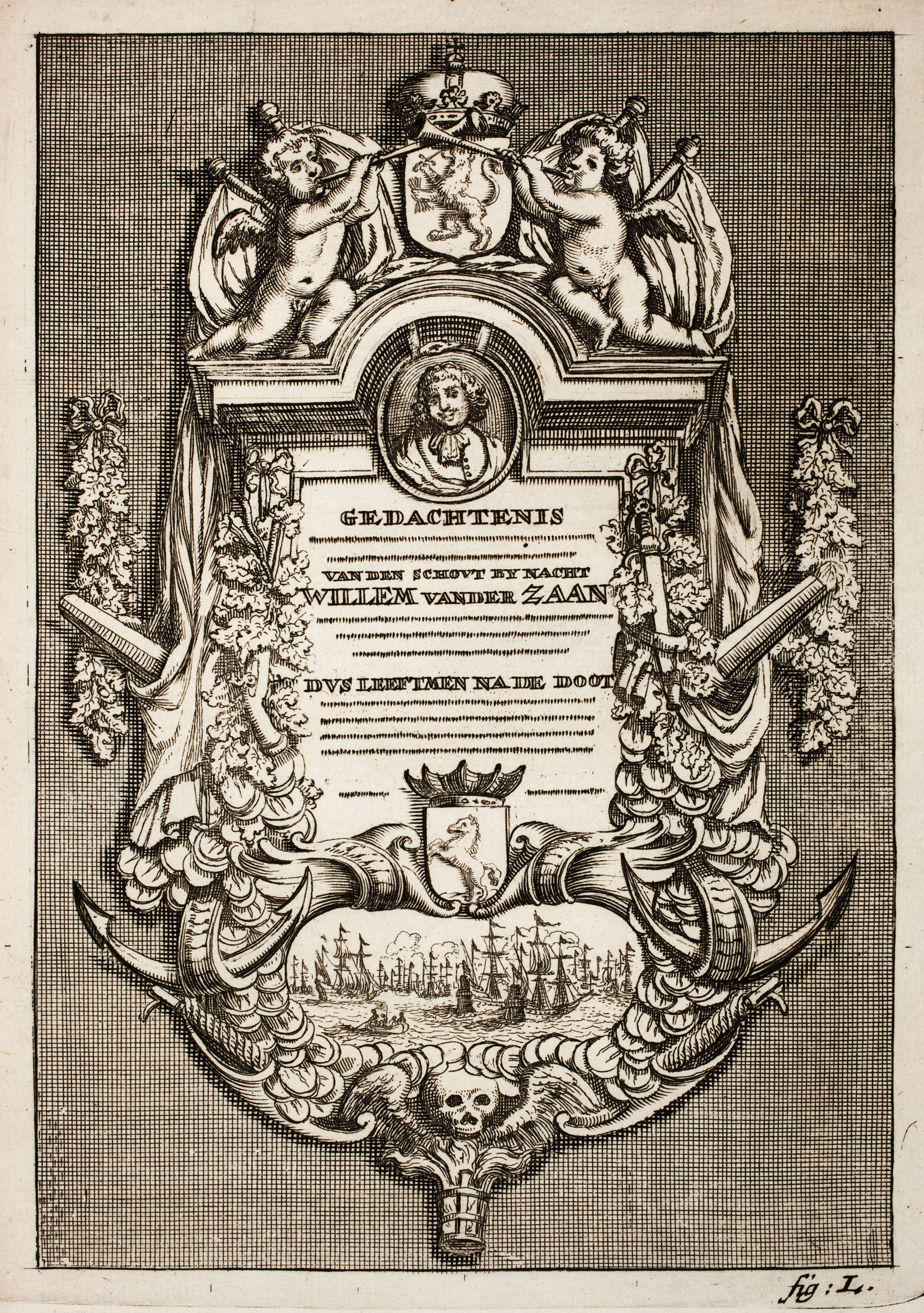
Funerary monument for Willem van der Zaan. Oude Kerk, Amsterdam. Bizot, Medalische historie der republyk van Holland, 1690.

Willem van der Zaan (29 June 1621 – 17 March 1669) was a Dutch Admiral. His name is often given in the 17th century spelling Zaen.

== Biography ==
Willem was born in Amsterdam. He joined the Dutch navy at a young age and had risen to the rank of captain by 1652. He took part in the First Anglo-Dutch War from 1652–1654, fighting in the Battle of Dungeness on the Prinses Aemilia, and on the Campen (after the previous captain, his brother Joris van der Zaan, had been killed in the Battle of Portland; in the same battle his other brother, Huybrecht van der Zaan, was killed also) in the Battle of the Gabbard and the Battle of Scheveningen. In 1655 he was made a full captain. In 1656 he commands the Zuyderhuys, having on board his nephew, the son of Huybrecht, Cornelis van der Zaan, later a captain also.

In 1657 he participated in an action in the Mediterranean under Vice-Admiral Michiel de Ruyter, during which he captured the French warship Chasseur, caught while illegally privateering, causing much embarrassment to the French government that had given secret orders to do so. Cardinal Mazarin summoned the Dutch ambassador to ask for excuses, who then lost his temper and left the court in a fury after telling the cardinal, the most powerful man of France, in his face that he was no better than a common pirate. The States-General showed their opinion on this by awarding Van der Zaan a golden honorary chain. In 1658 he fought against Sweden in the Battle of the Sound, again participating in actions in the Baltic in 1659 and 1660, as captain of the Huys Tijdverdrijf. In 1661, as captain of the Middelburg, he is again with De Ruyter in the Mediterranean. When the Dutch fleet is challenged by the Bey of Algiers, Suleiman Basha Reis, to provide a champion for a ship duel, De Ruyter chooses Van der Zaan as such; but the Algerian champion didn't show up. That year Van der Zaan received another golden chain for capturing a corsair liberating 36 Christian slaves; in 1663 a third one having taken a privateer with 21 Christian slaves on board.

He participated, as captain of 't Geloof, in Vice-Admiral Michiel de Ruyter's punitive action against the British in West-Africa and America in 1664 and 1665. Late 1664 he was appointed a temporary Rear-Admiral with the Admiralty of Amsterdam. On return in August 1665 he was given his fourth golden chain, a record. The Second Anglo-Dutch War had then already begun and Van der Zaan was made captain of the new Gouda later in 1665, but he had to give up command for several months because of a depression or "melancholy" as it was then called. In 1666 he recovered and was made captain of the Beschermer. In the Four Days Battle fighting under Cornelis Tromp he captured the Seven Oaks on the second day but returned with his prize against general orders, for which he was fined 3000 guilders. He fought in the St James's Day Battle with Engel de Ruyter, the son of Michiel de Ruyter, as officer on his ship. In 1667 he participated in the Raid on the Medway, but as part of the covering fleet.

On 1 July 1667 he was made a permanent Rear-Admiral. He died during an action against the corsairs of Algiers on 17 March 1669 off Cape Tres Forcas, hit in the chest by a one-pound cannonball when boarding the flagship of the Algerian admiral. His death was blamed on insufficient assistance by his subcommanders. He was buried in the Oude Kerk in Amsterdam, where a grave memorial in the form of an epitaph was erected, a work by Rombout Verhulst.

Willem married Agatha van der Eyck (1633–1703) in 1654; they had a son, Willem van der Zaan the Younger, who would be a Dutch navy captain. The Rear-Admiral's great-granddaughter, his last surviving descendant the widow Cornelia Agatha van Dam-Gerlings, would in 1798 donate some family heirlooms to the Amsterdam naval training school, among them three of the golden honorary chains, the bullet that killed the admiral, a drawing of the Battle of the Gabbard by Willem van de Velde the Elder and a painting of him and his wife by Abraham van den Tempel. Later she would bestow a legacy of 10,000 guilders onto the school with the stipulation that each year the directors would gather with the students below the picture to tell them of Van der Zaan's heroic feats, all present enjoying a glass of wine. This tradition was discontinued when in the 20th century the school's art collection was relocated to the Amsterdam naval museum, the Nederlands Scheepvaartmuseum.

== Naming honors ==
- HNLMS Willem van der Zaan (ML-2), a Royal Netherlands Navy minelayer
- HNLMS Willem van der Zaan (F829), a Royal Netherlands Navy Karel Doorman-class frigate
