= Portrait of Michiel de Ruyter =

Painting by Ferdinand Bol

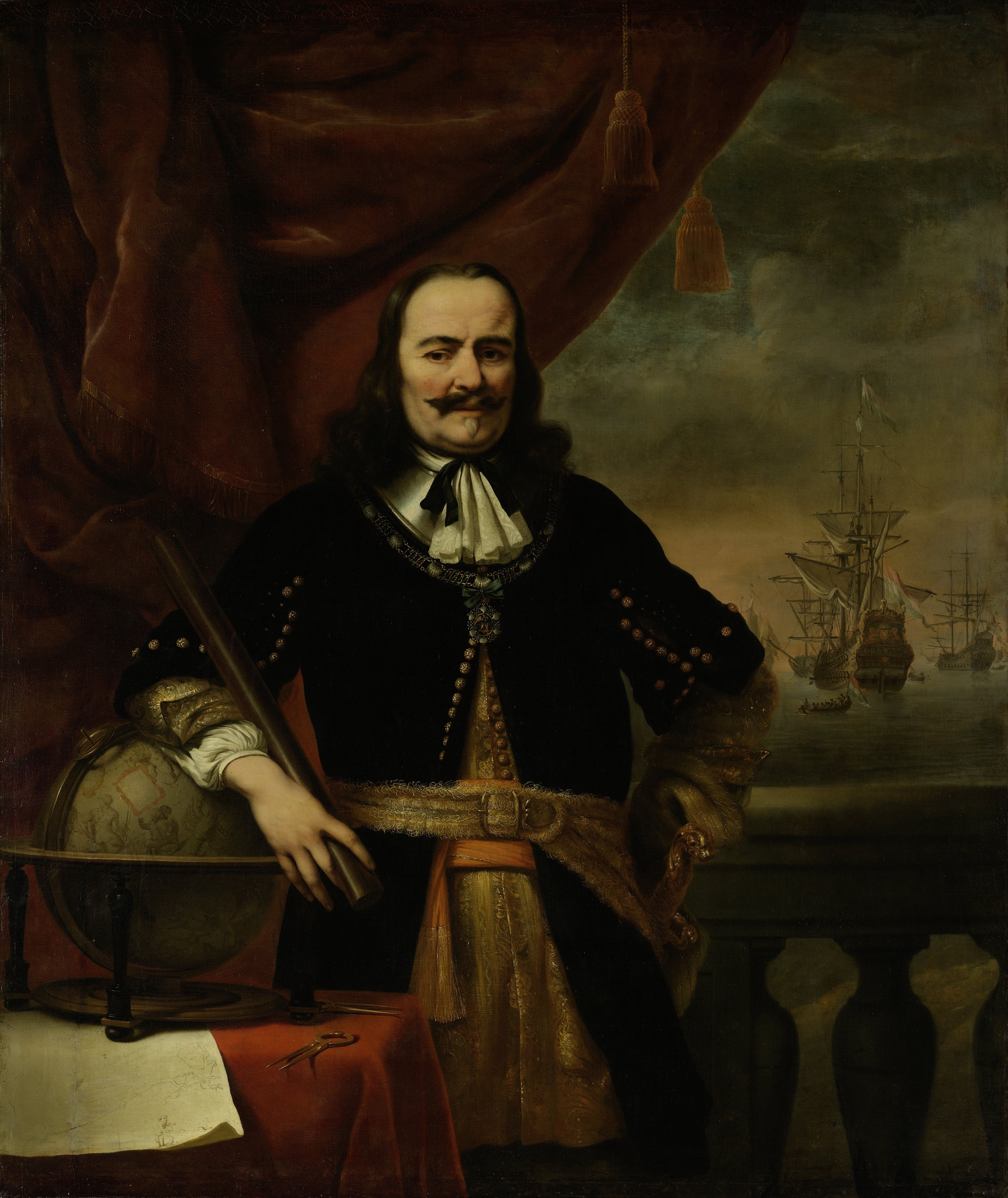
- Artist: Ferdinand Bol
- Year: 1667
- Medium: Oil on canvas
- Dimensions: 157 cm × 138 cm (62 in × 54 in)
- Location: Rijksmuseum; Amsterdam

Portrait of Michiel de Ruyter is an oil-on-canvas painting by the Dutch artist Ferdinand Bol, from 1667. It depicts Dutch Navy officer Michiel de Ruyter, with a marine landscape in the background thought to be by Willem van de Velde (II), including de Ruyter's flagship De Zeven Provinciën.

Produced in memory of the Four Days Battle, there were originally six identical versions of the work, each hanging in one of the offices of the Dutch Republic's Admiralty. One of them is now lost and the one now in the Rijksmuseum, in Amsterdam, was originally for the Admiralty of Zeeland in Middelburg, to which it was given by de Ruyter himself in 1667. Those now in the Mauritshuis and Westfries Museum were originally in the Navy Department and the Admiralty of the Noorderkwartier respectively. Others are now in the National Maritime Museum and the National Museum of Denmark.

The Rijksmuseum version was recorded in the office of the Department of Convoys and Licences (roughly equivalent to a tax office) in Vlissingen in 1795 before being donated to the Rijksmuseum's predecessor the Koninklijk Museum by the Departmental Council of Zeeland. It was later loaned to the Het Scheepvaartmuseum for a time.

== Bibliography (in Dutch) ==
- Anoniem (1809) Catalogus der schilderijen, oudheden, enz. op het Koninklijk Museum te Amsterdam, Amsterdam: Gebroeders van Cleeff, p. 10, cat.nr. 37 (als Ferdinand Bol, ‘Het Portrait van den Luitenant Admiraal, Hertog en Ridder Michiel Adriaansz. de Ruiter’).
- Anoniem (1830) Aanwijzing der schilderijen, berustende op ’s Rijks Museum, te Amsterdam, [s.l.: s.n.], p. 11, cat.nr. 35 (als Ferdinand Bol, ‘Het portret van den luitenant-admiraal, hertog en ridder Michiel Adriaansz. de Ruiter’).
- Anoniem (1839) Aanwijzing der schilderijen, berustende op ’s Rijks Museum te Amsterdam, [s.l.: s.n.], p. 9, cat.nr. 35 (als Ferdinand Bol, ‘Portret van den luitenant admiraal hertog en ridder Michiel Adriaansz. de Ruiter’). Zie Google Boeken.
- Anoniem (1903) Catalogus der Schilderijen miniaturen, pastels, omlijste teekeningen, enz. in het Rijks-Museum te Amsterdam, Amsterdam: Boek- en kunstdrukkerij v/h Roeloffzen-Hübner en Van Santen, p. 55, cat.nr. 549 (als Ferdinand Bol, Michiel Adriaensz. de Ruyter). Zie archive.org.
- Anoniem (1934) Catalogus der schilderijen pastels–miniaturen–aquarellen tentoongesteld in het Rijksmuseum te Amsterdam, Amsterdam: J.H. de Bussy, p. 53, cat.nr. 549 (als Ferdinand Bol, Michiel Adr. de Ruyter). Zie delpher.nl.

== Exhibition History ==
- De stadhouder-koning en zijn tijd 1650-1950, Rijksmuseum, Amsterdam, 18 March-29 May 1950, cat.nr. 126.
