= St. James' Day Battle =

Naval battle of the 2nd Anglo-Dutch War

Coordinates: 51.367°N 1.600°E

St James' Day Battle
- Part of the Second Anglo-Dutch War
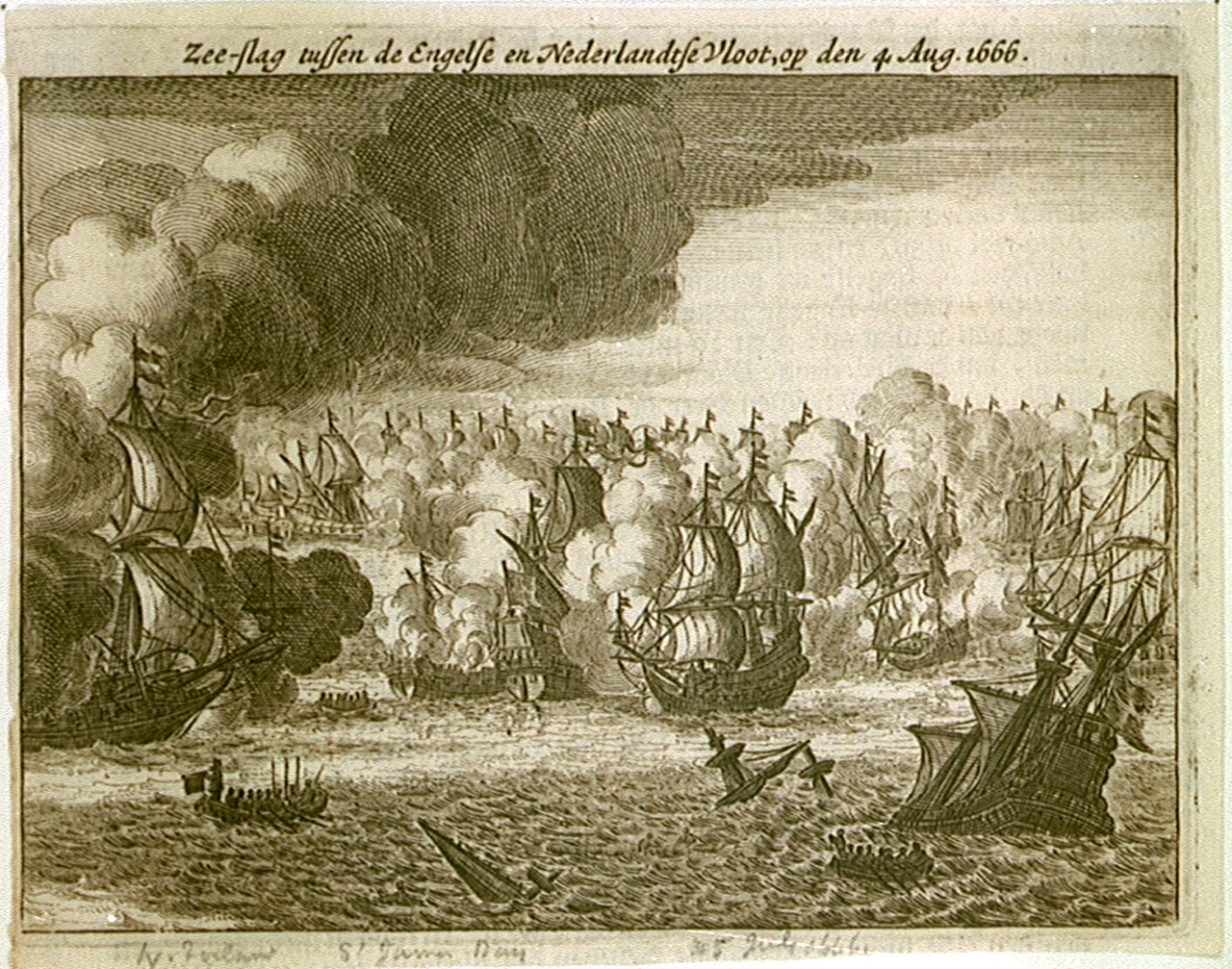
- Engraving showing the St. James Day battle August 4th, 1666, between English and Dutch ships
Date	25 July (Julian calendar) or 4 August (Gregorian calendar), 1666
Location	near North Foreland, England
Result	English victory

Belligerents
England	Dutch Republic

Commanders and leaders
Prince Rupert; George Monck	Michiel de Ruyter

Strength
81–90 ships of the line and frigates; 16 fireships	88–90 ships of the line and frigates; 20 fireships; 9 yachts

Casualties and losses
1 ship sunk; c. 300 killed	2 ships lost (sources vary); c. 800 killed

The St James' Day Battle (Note: also known as the St James' Day Fight, Battle of the North Foreland or Battle of Orfordness; In the Netherlands, the battle is known as the Two Days' Battle.) took place on 25 July 1666 (Note: St James' day in the Julian calendar then in use in England) (4 August 1666 in the Gregorian calendar), during the Second Anglo-Dutch War. It was fought between an English fleet commanded jointly by Prince Rupert of the Rhine and George Monck, and a Dutch force under Lieutenant-Admiral Michiel de Ruyter.

== Background ==
After the Dutch had inflicted enormous damage on the English fleet in the Four Days Battle of 1–4 June 1666 which is normally considered a Dutch victory, the Dutch leading politician grand pensionary Johan de Witt ordered Lieutenant-Admiral Michiel de Ruyter to carry out a plan that had been prepared for over a year: to land in the Medway to destroy the English fleet while it was being repaired in the Chatham dockyards. For this purpose ten fluyt ships carried 2,700 marines of the newly created Dutch Marine Corps, the first in history. Also De Ruyter was to combine his fleet with the French one.

The French however did not show up and bad weather prevented the landing. De Ruyter had to limit his actions to a blockade of the Thames. On the 1st of August he observed that the English fleet was leaving port - earlier than expected. Then a storm drove the Dutch fleet back to the Flemish coast. On the 3rd De Ruyter again crossed the North Sea, leaving behind the troop ships.

== Battle ==
=== First day ===
In the early morning of 25 July, the Dutch fleet of 88 ships discovered the English fleet of 89 ships near North Foreland, sailing to the north. De Ruyter gave orders for a chase and the Dutch fleet pursued the English from the southeast in a leeward position, as the wind blew from the northwest. Suddenly, the wind turned to the northeast. The English commander, Prince Rupert of the Rhine, then turned sharply east to regain the weather gauge. De Ruyter followed, but the wind fell and the fleet fell behind. The Dutch van, commanded by Lieutenant-Admiral Johan Evertsen, was becalmed and drifted away from the line of battle, splitting De Ruyter's fleet in two. This awkward situation lasted for hours; then, again, a soft breeze began to blow from the northeast. Immediately, the English van, commanded by Thomas Allin, and part of the centre formed a line of battle and engaged the Dutch van, still in disarray.

The Dutch failed to form a coherent line of battle in response, and ship after ship was mauled by the combined firepower of the English line. Vice-Admiral Rudolf Coenders was killed, and Lieutenant-Admiral Tjerk Hiddes de Vries had an arm and a leg shot off, yet still tried to bring cohesion to his force — but to no avail. Unable to reach them with his centre, the horrified De Ruyter saw the Frisian ships drifting to the south, now no more than floating wrecks full of dead, the moans of the dying clearly audible above the other sounds of battle.

With the Dutch van defeated, the English converged to deliver the coup-de-grâce to De Ruyter's centre. George Monck, accompanying Rupert, predicted that De Ruyter would give two broadsides and run, but the latter put up a furious fight on the Dutch flagship De Zeven Provinciën. He withstood a combined attack by Royal Sovereign and Royal Charles and forced Rupert to leave the damaged Royal Charles for Royal James. The Dutch centre's resistance enabled the seaworthy remnants of the van to make an escape to the south.

Tromp's turn to the west

Lieutenant-Admiral Cornelis Tromp, commanding the Dutch rear, had from a great distance seen the disaster for the Dutch fleet evolve. Annoyed by what he saw as a lack of competence, he decided to give the correct example. He turned sharply to the west, crossed the line of the English rear, under the command of Jeremiah Smith, separating it from the rest of the English fleet and then, having the weather gauge, kept on attacking it rabidly until at last the English were routed and fled to the west. He pursued well into the night, destroying HMS Resolution with a fireship. After Tromp three times shot the entire crew from its rigging, Smith's flagship HMS Loyal London caught fire and had to be towed home. The vice commander of the English rear was Edward Spragge, who felt so humiliated by the course of events that he became a personal enemy of Tromp. He would later be killed pursuing Tromp in the Battle of the Texel.

=== Second day ===
On the morning of 26 July, Tromp broke off pursuit, well-pleased with his first real victory as a squadron commander. During the night, a ship had brought him the message that De Ruyter had likewise been victorious, so Tromp was in a euphoric mood. That abruptly changed upon the discovery of the drifting flagship of the dying Tjerk Hiddes de Vries. Suddenly he feared that his ship was now the only remnant of the Dutch fleet and that he was in mortal peril. Behind him, those ships of the English rear still operational had again turned to the east. In front, the other enemy squadrons surely awaited him. On the horizon, only English flags were to be seen. Manoeuvring wildly, Tromp, drinking a lot of gin to restore his nerve, dodged any attempt to trap him and brought his squadron safely home in the port of Flushing on the morning of 26 July. There, to great mutual relief, he discovered the rest of the Dutch fleet.

It took Tromp six hours to gather enough courage to face De Ruyter. It was obvious to him that he should never have allowed himself to get completely separated from the main force. Indeed, De Ruyter, not being his usual charitable self, immediately blamed him for the defeat and ordered Tromp and his subcommanders Isaac Sweers and Willem van der Zaan from his sight, and told them to never again set foot on De Zeven Provinciën. The commander of the Dutch fleet still had not mentally recovered from the events of the previous day.

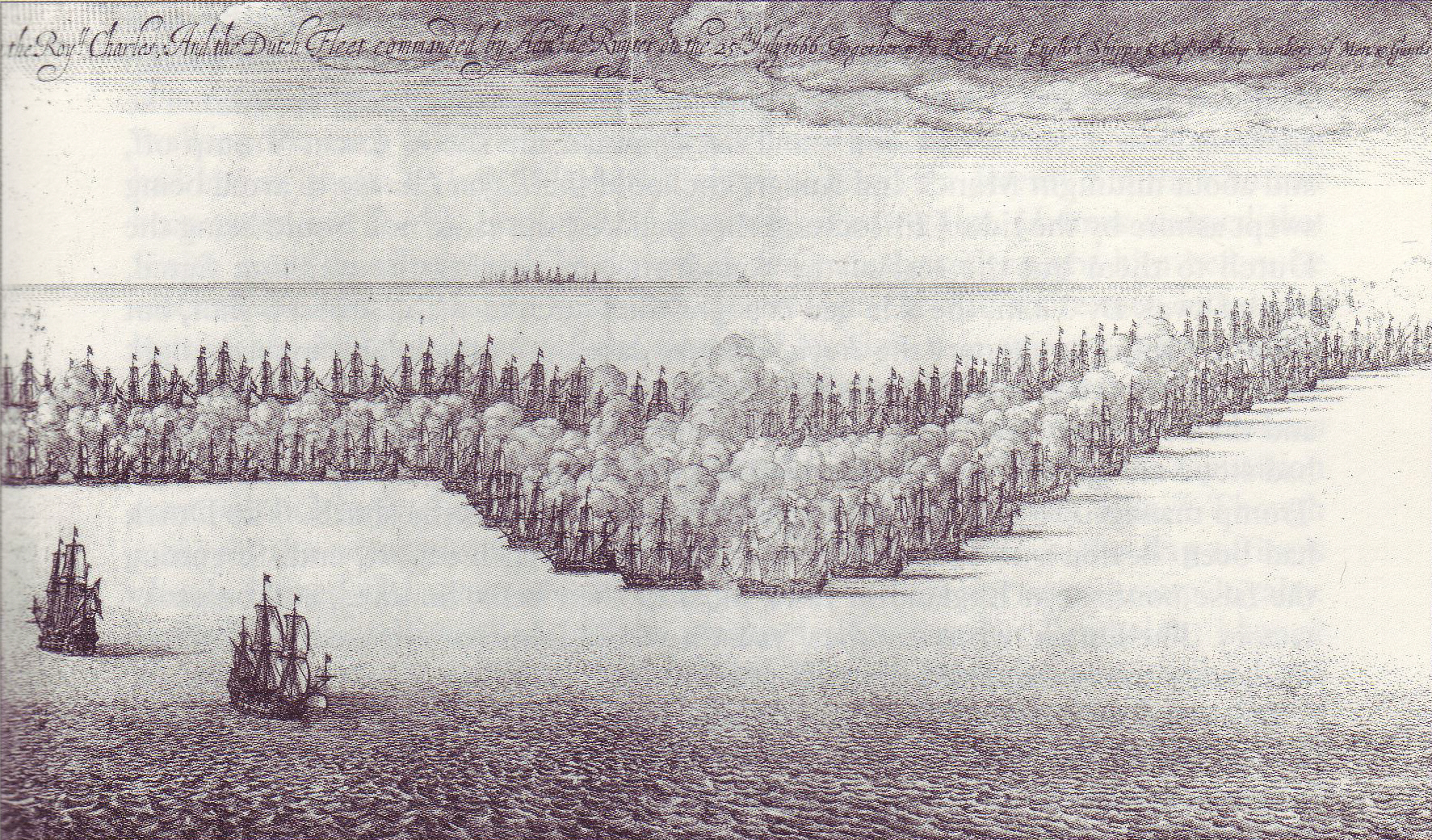
St. James Day Fight August 4th, 1666, by Wenceslaus Hollar

On the morning of 5 August, after a short summer's night, De Ruyter discovered that his position had become hopeless. Lieutenant-Admiral Johan Evertsen had died after losing a leg, De Ruyter's force was now reduced to about forty ships, crowding together and most of these were inoperational, being survivors of the van. Some fifteen good ships had apparently deserted during the night. A strong gale from the east prevented an easy retreat to the continental coast, and to the west the British van and centre (about fifty ships) surrounded him in a half-circle, safely bombarding him from a leeward position.

De Ruyter was desperate. When his second-in-command of the centre, Lieutenant-Admiral Aert Jansse van Nes visited him for a council of war, he exclaimed: "With seven or eight against the mass!" He then sagged, mumbling: "What's wrong with us? I wish I were dead." His close personal friend Van Nes tried to cheer him up, joking: "Me too. But you never die when you want to!" No sooner had both men left the cabin than the table they had been sitting at was smashed by a cannonball.

The English, however, had their own problems. The strong gale prevented them from closing with the Dutch. They tried to use fire ships, but these, too, had trouble reaching the enemy. Only the sloop Fan-Fan, Rupert's personal pleasure yacht, rowed to the Dutch flagship De Zeven Provinciën to harass it with its two little guns, much to the hilarious laughter of the English crews.

When his ship had again warded off an attack by a fireship (the Land of Promise) and Tromp still did not show up, for De Ruyter tension became unbearable. He sought death, exposing himself deliberately on the deck. When he failed to be hit, he exclaimed: "Oh, God, how unfortunate I am! Amongst so many thousands of cannonballs, is there not one that would take me?" His son-in-law, Captain of the Marines Johann de Witte, heard him and said: "Father, what desperate words! If you merely want to die, let us then turn, sail in the midst of our enemies and fight ourselves to death!". This brave but foolish proposal brought the Admiral back to his senses, for he discovered that he was not so desperate and answered: "You don't know what you are talking about! If I did that, all would be lost. But if I can bring myself and these ships safely home, we'll finish the job later."

Then the wind, that had brought so much misfortune to the Dutch, saved them by turning to the west. They formed a line of battle and brought their fleet to safety through the Flemish shoals, Vice-Admiral Adriaen Banckert of the Zealandic fleet covering the retreat of all damaged ships with the operational vessels, the number of the latter slowly growing as it turned out that only very few ships had actually deserted in the night; most had merely drifted away, and now, one after the other, they rejoined the battle.

== Aftermath ==
The battle was a clear English victory. Dutch casualties were initially thought to be enormous, estimated immediately after the battle of about 5,000 men, compared with 300 English killed; later, more precise information showed that only about 1,200 of them had been killed or seriously wounded. The Dutch only lost two ships: De Ruyter had been successful at saving almost the complete van, only Sneek and Tholen struck their flag. Tholen was the flagship of admiral Banckert who had moved his flag to another vessel. Both ships were burnt by the English. The Dutch could quickly repair the damage. The twin disasters of the Great Plague of London and the Great Fire of London, combined with his financial mismanagement, left Charles II without the funds to continue the war. In fact, he had had only enough reserves for this one last battle.

While the Dutch fleet was undergoing repairs, Admiral Robert Holmes, aided by the Dutch traitor Laurens van Heemskerck, penetrated the Vlie estuary, burnt a fleet of 150 merchants (Holmes's Bonfire) and sacked the town of Ter Schelling (the present West-Terschelling) on the Frisian island of Terschelling. Fan-Fan was again present.

In the Republic, the defeat also had a far-reaching political effect. Tromp was the champion of the Orangist party; now that he was accused of severe negligence, the country split over this issue. To defend himself, Tromp let his brother-in-law, Johan Kievit, publish an account of his conduct. Shortly afterward, Kievit was discovered to have planned a coup, secretly negotiating a peace treaty with the English king. He fled to England and was condemned to death in absentia; Tromp's family was fined and he himself forbidden to serve in the fleet. In November 1669, a supporter of Tromp tried to stab De Ruyter in the entrance hall of his house. Only in 1672 would Tromp have his revenge, when Johan de Witt was murdered; some claim Tromp had had a hand in this. The new ruler, William III of Orange, succeeded, with great difficulty, in reconciling De Ruyter with Tromp in 1673.

== Sources ==
- Brandt, Gerard (1687). Het Leven en bedryf van den Heere Michiel de Ruiter (in Dutch) (1st ed.). Uitgeverij van Wijnen, Franeker. ISBN 978-1-24639-809-0.
- Bruijn, Jaap R. (2011). The Dutch Navy of the Seventeenth and Eighteenth Centuries. Oxford University Press. ISBN 978-0-98649-735-3.
- Grant, R. G. (2011). Battle at Sea: 3000 Years of Naval Warfare. London: DK Publishing. ISBN 978-1-40535-335-9.
- Palmer, Mark (1997). "The 'Military Revolution' Afloat: The Era of the Anglo-Dutch Wars and the Transition to Modern Warfare at Sea". War in History. 4 (2): 123–149. doi:10.1177/096834459700400201. S2CID 159657621.
- Rideal, Rebecca (2016). 1666 : plague, war and hellfire. London: John Murray, publisher. ISBN 978-1-47362-355-2.
- Scheffer, Grant (1966). Roemruchte jaren van onze vloot. Baarn: Het Wereldvenster. OCLC 811870796.
- Stewart, William (2009). Admirals of the World: A Biographical Dictionary, 1500 to the Present. Jefferson: McFarland & Co. ISBN 978-0-78648-288-7.
- Sweetman, Jack, ed. (1997). The Great Admirals: Command at Sea, 1587-1945. Naval Institute Press. ISBN 978-0-87021-229-1.
