= Michiel de Ruyter =

Dutch States Navy officer (1607–1676)

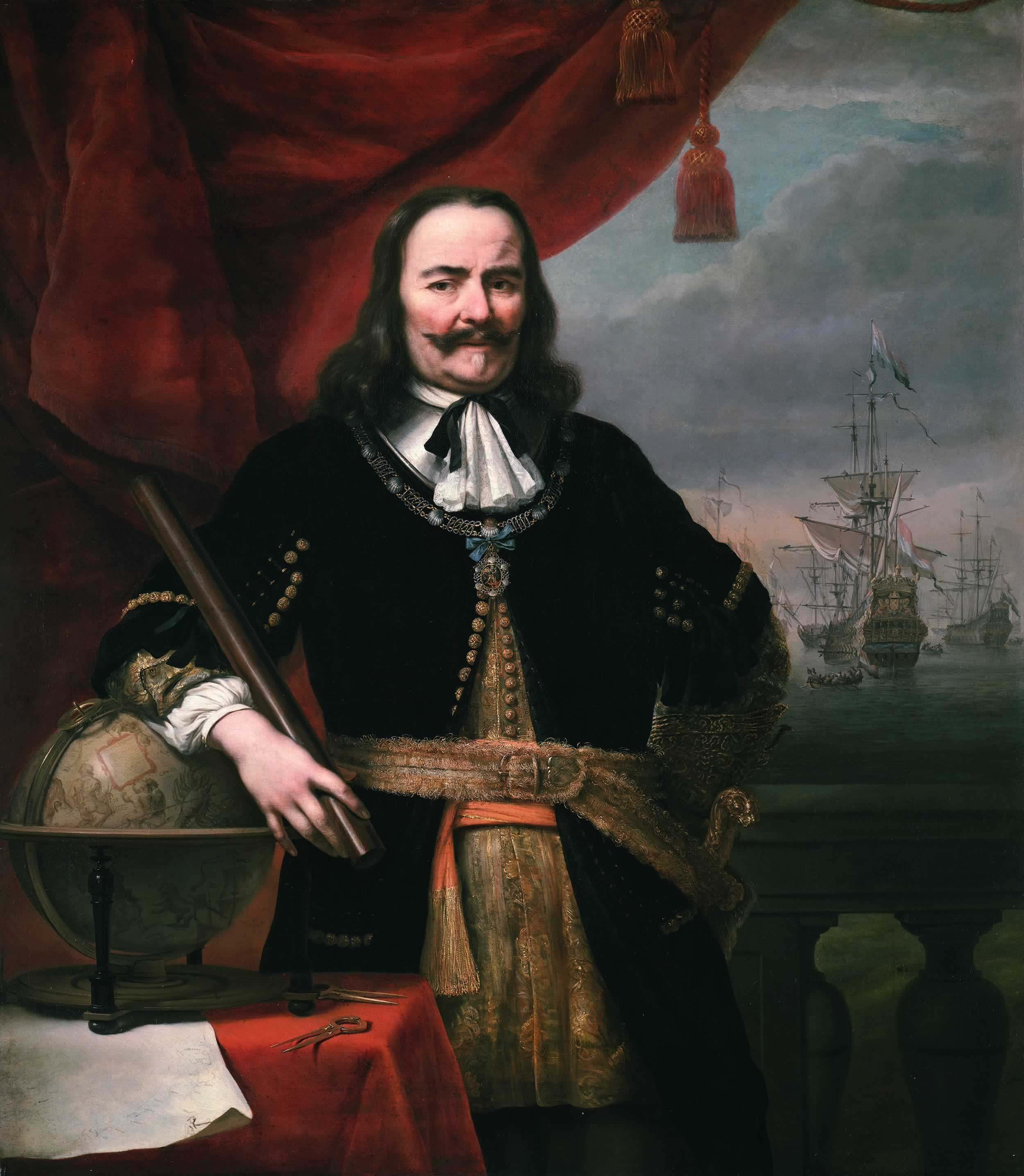
- De Ruyter in 1667, by Ferdinand Bol (National Maritime Museum – another autograph version is now in the Rijksmuseum)
- Born: Michiel Adriaenszoon; 24 March 1607; Vlissingen, Dutch Republic
- Died: 29 April 1676 (aged 69); Syracuse, Sicily, Spanish Empire (now Italy)
- Burial place: Nieuwe Kerk, Amsterdam and Syracuse in Sicily (the entrails)
- Relatives: Engel de Ruyter (son)
- Military career
- Allegiance: Dutch Republic
- Branch: Dutch States Navy
- Service years: 1637–1676
- Rank: Lieutenant-admiral general (Note: The rank of lieutenant-admiral general was created specifically for De Ruyter and Cornelis Tromp, to distinguish them from other naval officers with the rank of lieutenant-admiral.)
- Nickname: Bestevaêr
- Wars: Eighty Years' War; Cleves campaign; Siege of Bergen op Zoom; Dutch–Portuguese War; Portuguese Restoration War; Battle of Cape St. Vincent; First Anglo-Dutch War; Battle of Plymouth; Battle of the Kentish Knock; Battle of Dungeness; Battle of Portland; Battle of the Gabbard; Battle of Scheveningen; Second Northern War; Siege of Danzig; Battle of Nyborg; Second Anglo-Dutch War; Expedition to West Africa (1664-1665); Battle of Barbados; Raid on Newfoundland; Four Days' Battle; St. James's Day Battle; Raid on the Medway; Battle of Landguard Fort; Franco-Dutch War; Battle of Solebay; First Battle of Schooneveld; Second Battle of Schooneveld; Battle of Texel; Invasion of Martinique; Battle of Stromboli; Battle of Augusta †
- Awards: Order of Saint Michael

Michiel Adriaenszoon de Ruyter (IPA: [miˈxil ˈaːdrijaːnˌsoːn də ˈrœytər]; 24 March 1607 – 29 April 1676) was a Dutch States Navy officer. His achievements with the Dutch navy during the Anglo-Dutch Wars earned him the reputation as one of the greatest naval commanders in history.

De Ruyter came from a modest background in Zeeland and began seafaring from an early age; by the age of 30 he had become a shipmaster in the Dutch merchant fleet. In 1641, De Ruyter briefly served as a rear admiral during the Portuguese Restoration War, after which he returned to a prosperous merchant career for a decade before retiring to his hometown of Vlissingen. On the outbreak of the First Anglo-Dutch War in 1652, De Ruyter accepted a command in the Dutch Navy under lieutenant admiral Maarten Tromp, distinguished himself and was promoted to vice admiral at the end of the war. In 1655, he took part in the Second Northern War on the side of Denmark–Norway against Sweden.

De Ruyter was named lieutenant admiral and commander of the Dutch fleet at the start of the Second Anglo-Dutch War in 1665, and in 1666 he won a hard-fought victory in the Four Days' Battle in the southern North Sea. In 1667, De Ruyter executed the highly successful Raid on the Medway, where he destroyed much of the English fleet and captured the English flagship HMS Royal Charles, facilitating a favourable peace for the Dutch. In the Third Anglo-Dutch War, De Ruyter's actions during the battles of Solebay (1672), Schooneveld (1673), and Texel (1673) successfully prevented an invasion of the Dutch coast by Anglo-French forces. Continuing his fight against the French, De Ruyter was fatally wounded by a cannonball at the Battle of Augusta off Sicily in 1676, and died a week later in Syracuse. His body was brought back to Amsterdam, where he was accorded a state funeral and interred in the Nieuwe Kerk.

Often dubbed a Dutch folk hero, De Ruyter was highly respected by his sailors and soldiers, and his nickname Bestevaêr (early modern Dutch for "grandfather") is still used to refer to him in Dutch media today. Several Royal Netherlands Navy vessels have been named after him and his flagship, and he is credited as a founder of the Netherlands Marine Corps.

== Early life ==
De Ruyter was born on 24 March 1607 in Vlissingen (Flushing), in the province of Zealand, the son of a seaman who eventually became a member of the guild of beer porters, Adriaen Michielszoon, and Aagje Jansdochter. Many anecdotes were told of De Ruyter's early life, but of dubious historical value. For a time he worked at a ropewalk. He was sent to sea as a boatswain's apprentice at the age of 11, the usual age for Zeeland boys to begin seafaring.

In 1622, during the Eighty Years' War against Spain, he fought as a cannoneer in the new Dutch army under Maurice of Nassau against the Spanish during the relief of Bergen-op-Zoom. That same year he rejoined the Dutch merchant fleet and steadily worked his way up through the posts of boatswain and chief mate before becoming a merchant ship's master at the age of thirty. Although having had little formal education, he spoke tolerable French and fluent English.

Bruijn notes that an anonymous English biographer of de Ruyter claims that he was active in Dublin between 1623 and 1631 as a factor for the Vlissingen-based merchant house of the Lampsins brothers and had become fluent in English when living there. The source claimed that de Ruyter had a slight knowledge of the Irish language and at least one Irish friend who played a leading role in the capture of HMS Royal Charles in 1667.

De Ruyter occasionally travelled as supercargo to the Mediterranean or to the Barbary Coast. In those years, he usually referred to himself as "Machgyel Adriensoon", his name in the Zeelandic dialect he spoke, as he had not yet adopted the surname "De Ruyter". "De Ruyter" was most probably a nickname given to him: one explanation might be found in the older Dutch verb ruyten or ruiten, which means "to raid", something de Ruyter was known to do as a privateer with the Lampsins ship Den Graeuwen Heynst. Another suggestion is that the name "Ruyter", meaning "horseman" commemorates one of his grandfathers, who was a cavalry trooper.

On 16 March in 1631, he married Maayke Velders, a farmer's daughter. On 31 December that year, Maayke died after giving birth to a daughter; who also died just three weeks later. In 1633 and 1635, de Ruyter sailed as a navigating officer aboard the ship Groene Leeuw ("Green Lion") on whaling expeditions to Jan Mayen. Until 1637, he did not yet have a command of his own. In the summer of 1636 he remarried, this time to a daughter of a wealthy burgher named Neeltje Engels, who gave him four children – one of whom died shortly after birth. The others were named Adriaen (b. 1637), Neeltje (b. 1639) and Aelken (b. 1642).

In the midst of this, in 1637, de Ruyter became captain of a private ship meant to hunt for the Dunkirkers, raiders operating from Dunkirk who were preying on Dutch merchant shipping. He fulfilled this task until 1640. After this, he sailed for a while as skipper of a merchant vessel named De Vlissinge. In 1641, de Ruyter was nominated by the Admiralty of Zeeland to become the captain of the Haze, a merchant ship converted man-of-war carrying 26 guns, in a fleet under admiral Gijsels formed to assist the Portuguese in the Portuguese Restoration War against Philip IV of Spain, who was also Philip III of Portugal. The Dutch fleet was to join a Portuguese squadron fighting Spain at sea, and de Ruyter was appointed to be its Schout-bij-nacht or third in command. Although this expedition had little success, de Ruyter distinguished himself in combat against a Spanish fleet in the inconclusive action on 4 November 1641, off Cape St. Vincent. However, as a result of the loss of two ships and damage to others in this action, and the withdrawal of the Portuguese squadron after the action, the Dutch fleet returned home without completing its mission.

After the fleet was disbanded, de Ruyter returned to merchant service, which he undertook either as master of a Lampsins ship, or after buying his own ship, the Salamander.

Between 1642 and 1651, he made a number of profitable trading sailings to Morocco, Brazil and the West Indies, and by 1651, he had saved enough money to retire. In 1650, de Ruyter's second wife, who in 1649 had given him a second son, Engel, unexpectedly died. On 8 January 1652, he married a widow, Anna van Gelder, and bought a house in Flushing for his proposed retirement, which lasted less than a year.

== First Anglo-Dutch War ==
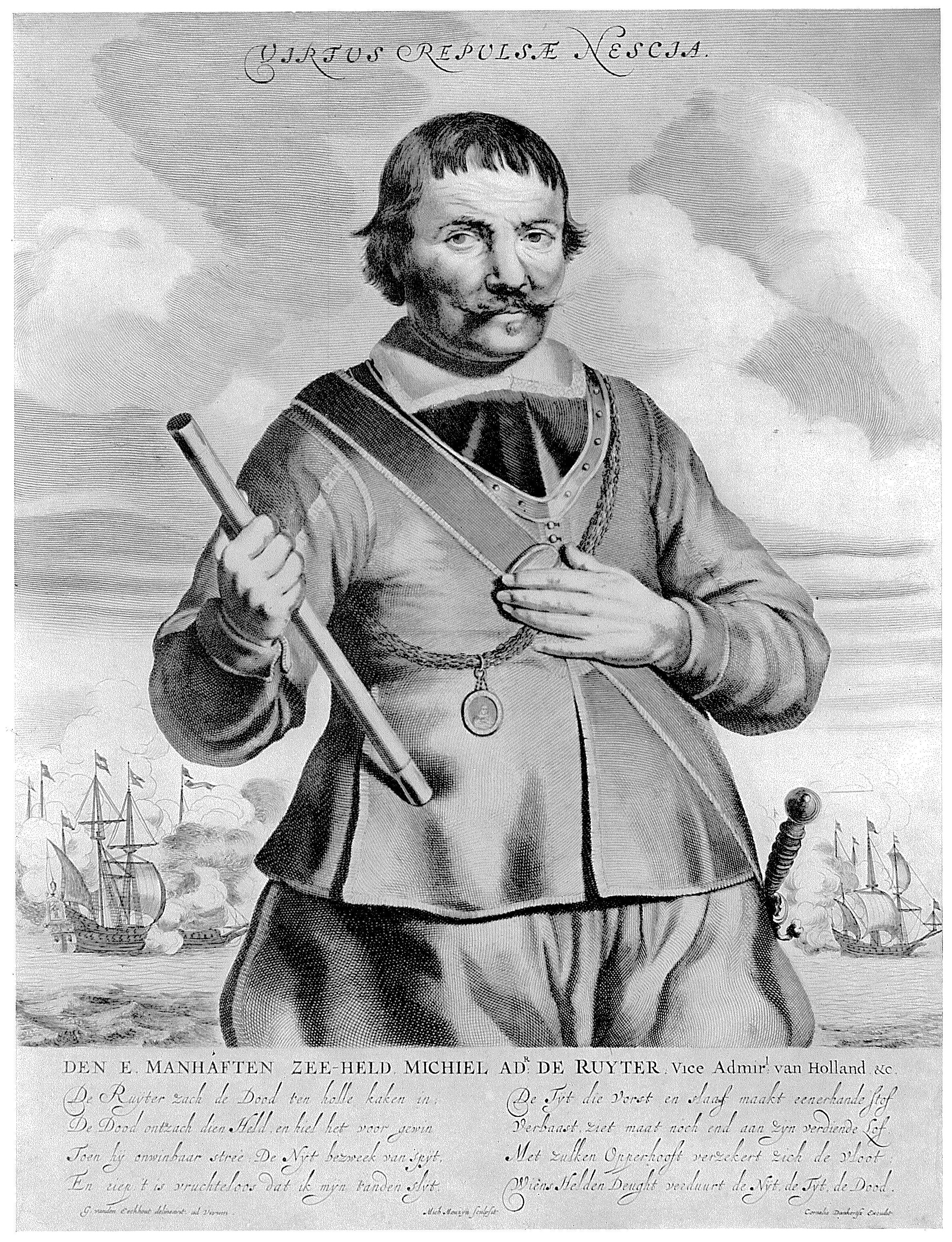
De Ruyter c. 1654

During the First Anglo-Dutch War of 1652–1654, De Ruyter agreed to join the expanding Dutch fleet as a junior flag-officer or commandeur, a rank broadly comparable to that of commodore, commanding a Zeelandic squadron of "director's ships", which were privately financed warships, after he had initially refused the post on the grounds that others were better qualified for it. De Ruyter proved his worth under the supreme commander lieutenant-admiral Maarten Tromp. The rank of admiral-general was reserved for the stadtholder, but at the time, no-one held that appointment. The main function of De Ruyter's squadron was to convoy outbound or returning Dutch merchant ships through the English Channel, where they were vulnerable to attacks from English ships based at Portsmouth or Plymouth.

In August 1652, a convoy of around sixty Dutch merchant ships left the Netherlands for the Mediterranean, initially with an escort of ten warships. The convoy was joined off the coast of the Spanish Netherlands by a further escort commanded by De Ruyter of between twenty and thirty fighting ships. The exact number of Dutch fighting ships involved in the subsequent battle is unclear, but De Ruyter sailed with 21 warships from all five of the Dutch admiralties, two large Dutch East India warships and six fireships. Additional warships may have joined him on route to the convoy and at least one warship was damaged before the subsequent battle and returned to port. On 15 August 1652, the convoy and its escort were sighted by an English fleet commanded by General at Sea George Ayscue with around 45 ships. Three of these were warships more powerful than any in the Dutch fleet, but, as in De Ruyter's fleet, many of the others were small armed merchant ships rather than purpose-built warships. On the afternoon of 16 August 1652, Ayscue attempted to attack and capture the Dutch merchant ships with around nine of his strongest and fastest warships, but De Ruyter counter-attacked, leaving the convoy unprotected, and he surrounded those English warships that had attacked. The ensuing mêlée battle continued until nightfall, as the outnumbered English ships could rely on their stronger gun batteries to keep the Dutch at bay. Most of the hired English merchant ships neither attempted to aid their warships nor pursue the Dutch merchant ships. As Ayscue was defeated in his aim of capturing or destroying Dutch merchant ships, and as De Ruyter had fought off an attack by a potentially superior force by a bold attack on its strongest ships, the latter had won this Battle of Plymouth and saved the convoy, making him an instant naval hero to the Dutch population. He also fought, as squadron commander, at the Battle of Kentish Knock and the Battle of the Gabbard during this war.

Tromp's death during the Battle of Scheveningen ended the war. De Ruyter declined an emphatic offer from Johan de Witt to assume supreme command because he considered himself 'unfit' and also feared that it would bring him into conflict with Witte de With and Johan Evertsen, both of whom had more seniority. Later, De Ruyter and de Witt became personal friends. Colonel Jacob van Wassenaer Obdam then became the new Dutch supreme commander of the confederate fleet. De Ruyter at first refused to become Obdam's naval 'counsellor and assistant', but later was persuaded by de Witt to accept and remained in the service of the Dutch navy in that post until he accepted an offer from the Admiralty of Amsterdam to become their vice-admiral on 2 March 1654. He relocated with his family to that city in 1655.

== Northern Wars ==
Michiel de Ruyter is raised to the nobility by Frederick III of Denmark

In July 1655, De Ruyter took command of a squadron of eight ships, of which the Tijdverdrijf ("Pastime") was his flagship, and set out for the Mediterranean with 55 merchantmen in convoy. His orders were to protect Dutch trade interests in that region and to ransom enslaved Christians in Algiers. Meeting an English fleet under Robert Blake along the way, he managed to avoid an incident. Operating off the Barbary Coast, he captured several infamous corsairs and, after negotiating a peace agreement with Salé, De Ruyter returned home in May 1656.

The same month, the States General, becoming ever more concerned by the expansionary plans of the Swedish king, Charles X, decided to intervene in the Second Northern War by sending a fleet to the Baltic Sea. The Swedes had controlled this area since Charles had invaded Poland and claimed the Polish throne. De Ruyter once again embarked aboard the Tijdverdrijf, arriving at the Øresund, where he waited for Obdam to arrive on 8 June. After Obdam had assumed command, De Ruyter and the Dutch fleet sailed to relieve the besieged city of Danzig on 27 July, which they did without any bloodshed. Peace was signed a month later. Before leaving the Baltic, De Ruyter and other flag officers were granted an audience by Frederick III of Denmark. De Ruyter took a liking to the Danish king, who later became a friend.

In 1658, the States General, on the advice of a leading member, Cornelis de Graeff, one of the mayors of Amsterdam, decided to once again send a fleet to the Baltic Sea to protect the important Baltic trade and to aid the Danes against Swedish aggression, which had continued despite a peace settlement. In accordance with the States' balance-of-power political approach, a fleet under Lieutenant-Admiral Jacob van Wassenaer Obdam was sent without De Ruyter, who at the time was blockading Lisbon. On 8 November, a bloody melee took place, the Battle of the Sound, which resulted in a Dutch victory, relieving Copenhagen. Still the Swedes were far from defeated and the States decided to continue their support for the Danes. De Ruyter took command of a new expeditionary fleet and managed to liberate Nyborg in 1659. For this, he was knighted by King Frederick III of Denmark. From 1661 to 1663, De Ruyter did convoy duty in the Mediterranean.

== Second Anglo-Dutch War ==
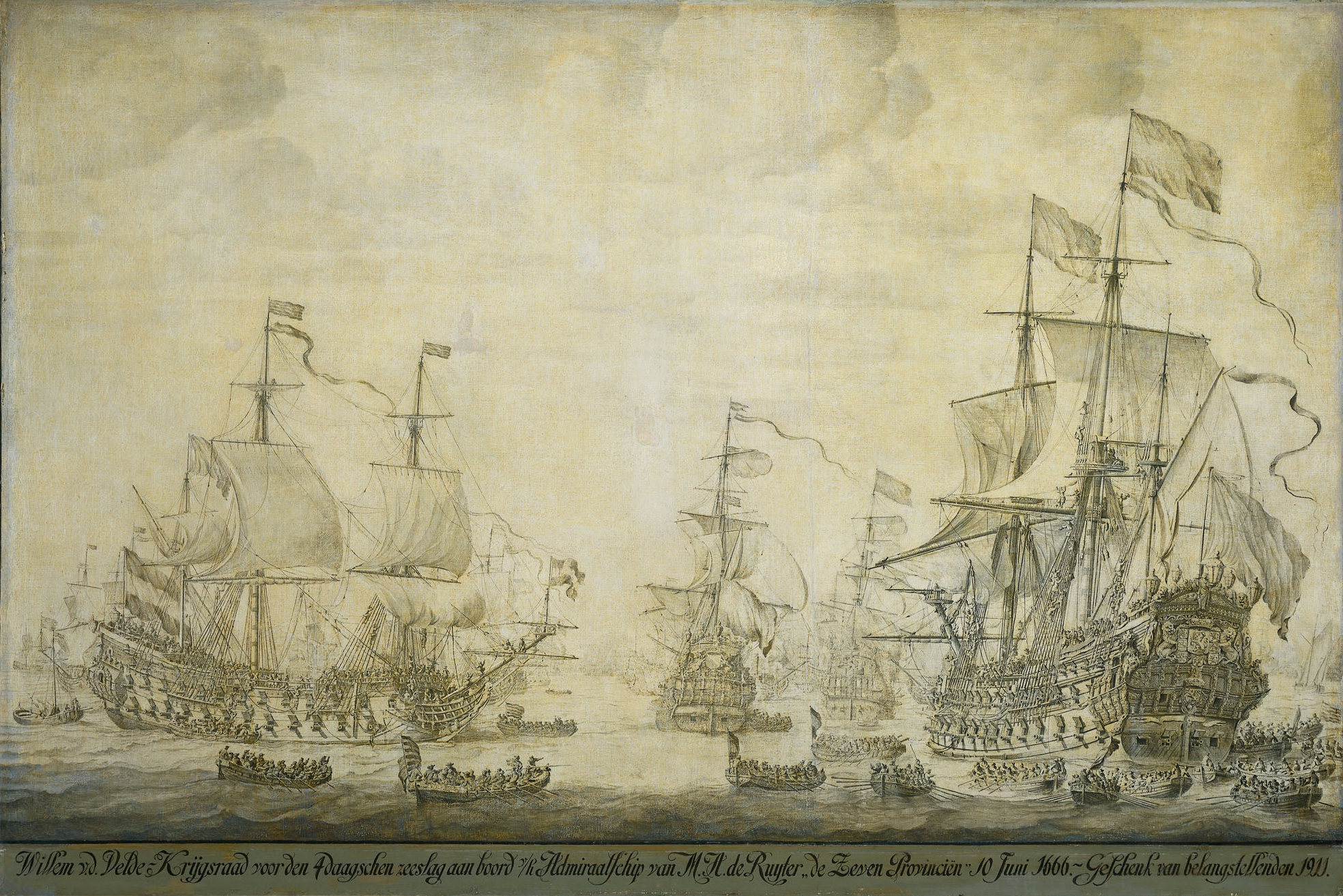
Battle council on the Zeven Provinciën, 10 June 1666 by Van de Velde the younger

In 1664, a year before the Second Anglo-Dutch War began, Robert Holmes had captured several Dutch West India Company trading posts and ships on the West African coast, seeking to forcibly expel Dutch influence from the region. Although Johan de Witt wanted to avoid an all-out war with England, he considered that this provocation must be responded to, and proposed to the States General that De Ruyter's squadron in the Mediterranean should be sent to West Africa to retake the West India Company's forts there. De Ruyter received his instructions at Málaga on 1 September 1664 and, by early the next month, all the Dutch West African posts had been recaptured and the squadron was ready to cross the Atlantic to attack English shipping in the West Indies and at the Newfoundland fisheries in reprisal.

De Ruyter's activities in the American waters had less satisfactory results than those off West Africa. Arriving off Barbados in the Caribbean at the end of April 1665 aboard his flagship Spiegel (directly translating to mirror but in Dutch use may also refer to the transom or more simply the rear of a ship), he led his fleet of thirteen vessels into Carlisle Bay, exchanging fire with the English batteries and destroying many of the vessels anchored there. Unable to silence the English guns and having sustained significant casualties and considerable damage to his vessels, he retired to French Martinique for repairs.

Sailing north from Martinique, De Ruyter captured several English vessels and delivered supplies to the Dutch colony at Sint Eustatius. In view of the damage that his ships had sustained at Barbados, he decided against an assault on New York, formerly New Amsterdam which would have been necessary, had the Dutch wished to retake their former New Netherland colony. De Ruyter then proceeded to Newfoundland, capturing some English merchant ships and temporarily taking the town of St. John's before returning to Europe, travelling around the north of Scotland as a precaution.

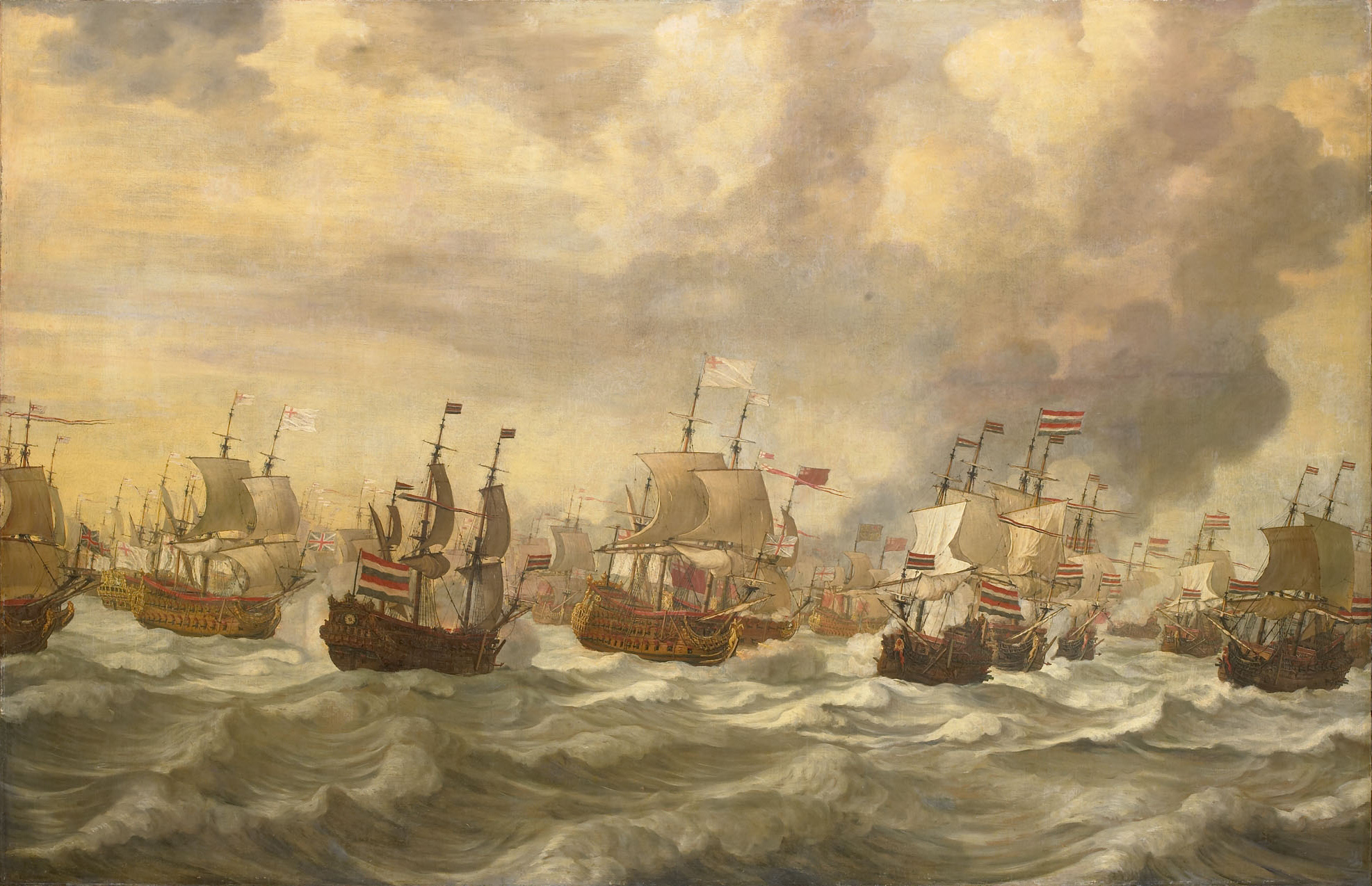
Four Days' Battle of 1 to 4 June 1666

In December 1664, the English fleet attacked the Dutch Smyrna fleet. Although the attack failed, the Dutch in January 1665 allowed their ships to open fire on English warships when threatened. War was declared by the Dutch on 4 March 1665, following two further English attacks on Dutch convoys, one off Cadiz and another in the English Channel. The Dutch fleet was confident of victory but it contained a significant proportion of older or weak ships. In the first year of the Second Anglo-Dutch War, at the Battle of Lowestoft on 13 June 1665, the Dutch suffered the worst defeat in the history the Dutch Republic's navy. At least sixteen ships were lost, and one-third of its personnel captured or killed; Van Wassenaer was among the dead.

On his return to the republic, De Ruyter learned Van Wassenaer had been killed at Lowestoft. Cornelis Tromp had been put in temporary command of the confederate fleet after the battle, but was not acceptable to the regime of Johan de Witt because of his support for the Orangist cause. De Ruyter was politically neutral, but on friendly terms with Johan de Witt and his associates. His successes in distant waters, which ensured he was not involved in the battle of Lowestoft and tainted by that defeat, made him the obvious candidate to succeed Van Wassenaer as commander of the Dutch fleet, which he did on 11 August 1665. He was therefore made lieutenant-admiral (a rank he would in 1666 share with five others in the Dutch admiralties) of Rotterdam, a position traditionally reserved for the Bevelhebber van 's-Landts Vloot, the supreme operational commander.

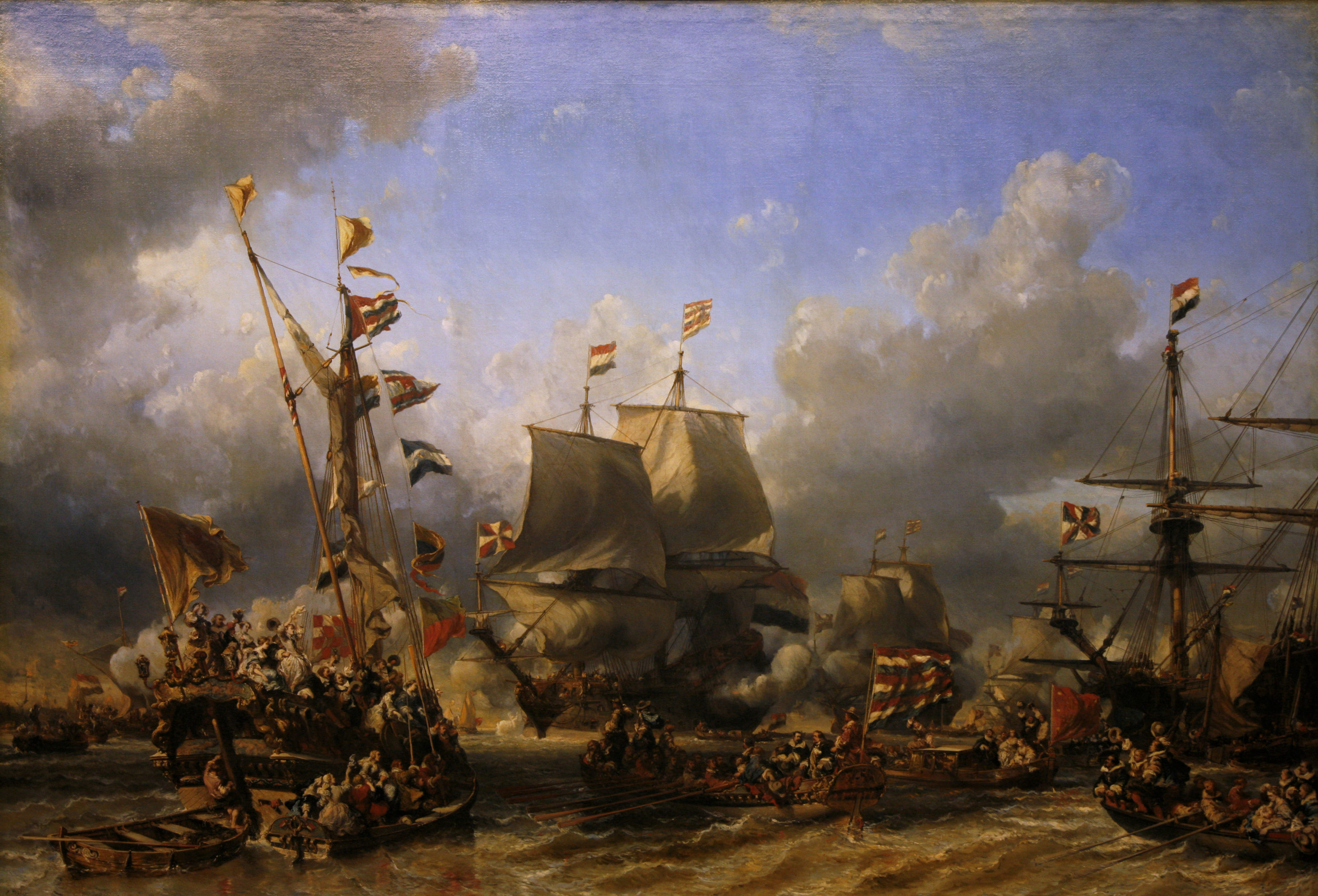
De Ruyter and De Witt's embarkment at Texel in 1667, by Eugène Isabey

In the second year of the war, 1666, De Ruyter won the hard-fought Four Days' Battle of 1 to 4 June 1666. The division of the English fleet gave the Dutch the advantage of numbers on the first and second days of fighting. An English attack on the anchored Dutch fleet on the first day was resisted and, after two days fighting, the English fleet retreated towards the Thames. However, the English fleet was reinforced by a squadron of undamaged ships on the third evening and fought strongly on the fourth day, so that Tromp seemed near to defeat in the afternoon, until De Ruyter decided the battle with a surprise all-out attack that demoralised his opponents into retreat.

However, the English fleet was not destroyed and, on 4 and 5 August, the Dutch suffered heavy manpower losses and narrowly escaped disaster in the St. James's Day Battle. After the battle, De Ruyter accused Cornelis Tromp of ignoring the main English attack on the Dutch fleet, preferring to chase the English rear squadron as far as the coast, which eventually led to Tromp's dismissal. De Ruyter then became seriously ill, recovering just in time to take nominal command of the fleet executing the Raid on the Medway in 1667, the third year of the war. The Medway raid was part of a broader plan by Johan de Witt to land Dutch troops in Kent or Essex, and De Ruyter neither agreed with de Witt's fixation with the Thames estuary as the critical theatre of the naval war nor with this raid. The Medway raid was a costly and embarrassing defeat for the English, resulting in the loss of the English flagship HMS Royal Charles and effectively ended the war in favour of the Dutch.

A planned Dutch attack on the English anchorage at Harwich led by De Ruyter had to be abandoned after the battle of Landguard Fort, at the close of the war. The Peace of Breda brought the war to an end.

Between 1667 and 1671, De Ruyter was forbidden by De Witt to sail, so as not to endanger his life. In 1669, a failed attempt on his life was made by a Tromp supporter, who tried to stab him with a bread knife in the entrance hall of his house.

== Third Anglo-Dutch War ==
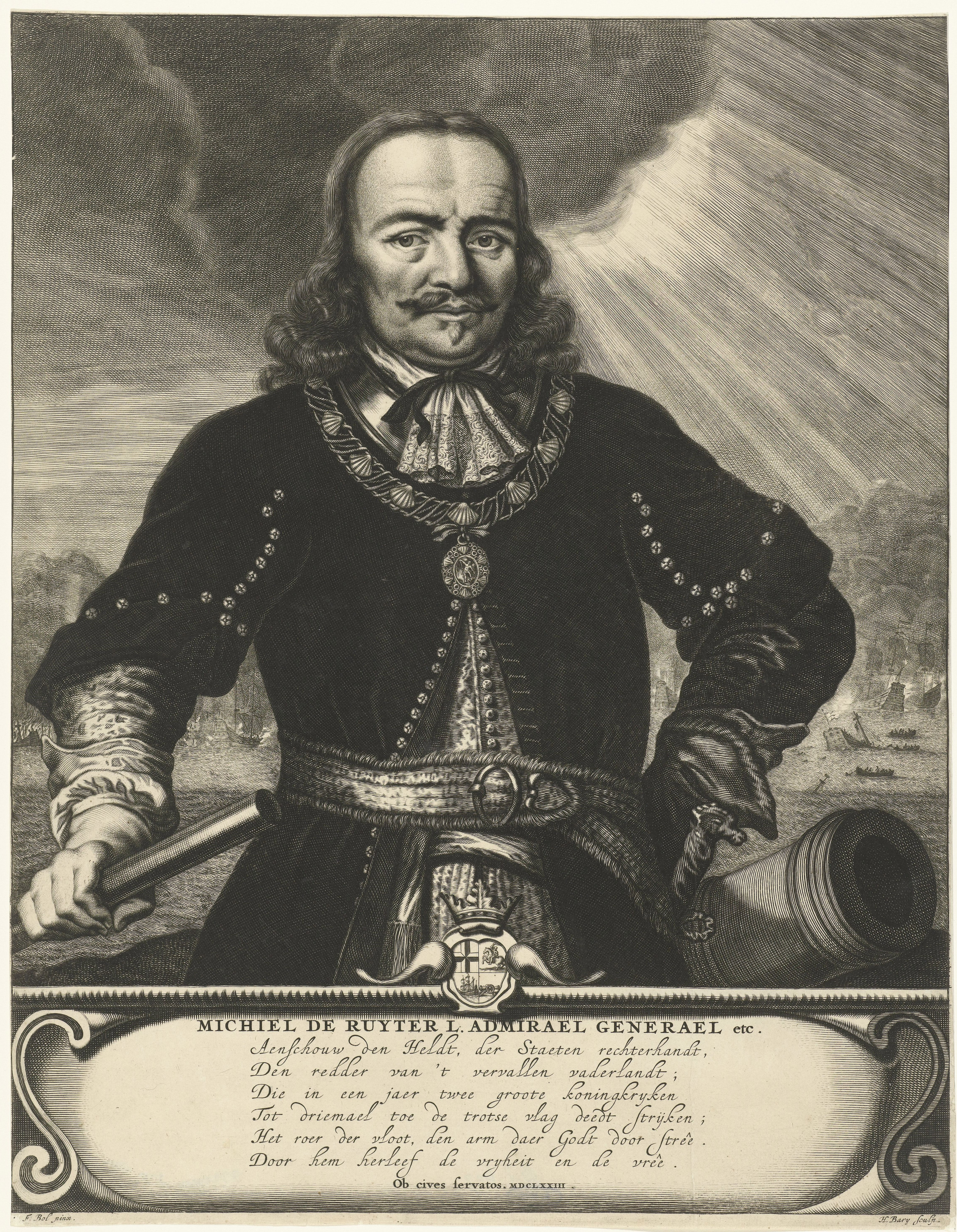
De Ruyter, c. 1673

The Treaty of Breda which ended the Second Anglo-Dutch War in July 1667 failed to remove the root causes of the long-standing Anglo-Dutch rivalry, which included colonial quarrels, including the exclusion of the English traders from Dutch colonies and the English occupation of the former Dutch New Netherland colony, and English enforcement of the Navigation Act. Although tensions between the two nations lessened between 1668 and 1670, the desire of Louis XIV to acquire all or a substantial part of the Spanish Netherlands and neutralise the Dutch Republic, led to his subsidising Charles II and to an unprovoked and unsuccessful English attack on the Dutch Smyrna fleet in March 1672. An English declaration of war against the Netherlands in the same month began the Third Anglo-Dutch War, and this was followed by a French declaration of war against the Dutch in May 1672.

Shortly thereafter, a combined Anglo-French fleet was formed, commanded by James, Duke of York the Lord High Admiral of England with 62 major warships and Jean, Comte d'Estrées with 30 major warships forming the van squadron.

The Dutch were surprised by these events but eventually managed to prepare a strong fleet of 75 ships under De Ruyter. However, because delays in his fleet mustering, he was unable to realise his plan of preventing the junction of the English and French fleets to create a force superior to his, so he used three different strategies to meet changing situations in the following two years. Firstly, he aimed to inflict sufficient damage on the English ships to require their lengthy repairs in the congested English dockyards, as in his attack at Solebay. Allied to this, when De Ruyter detected the French fleet's reluctance to become involved in close-quarters fighting, he detached small squadrons in each major sea battle to keep the French out of the main action, concentrating his attack on the English fleet with only slightly inferior numbers. Thirdly, he used the shelter of the shoals, which the larger of the allied ships had to avoid, as a safe haven, keeping the Dutch fleet intact until he could attack the allied fleet at a time and under conditions of his own choosing. In this way, he prevented the English and French fleets from creating the conditions needed to land an invasion force.

After initially withdrawing into shoal waters near the Netherlands coast until the combined Anglo-French fleet retired to replenish its water, De Ruyter attacked its 92 ships on 7 June 1672 at the Battle of Solebay. The Dutch fleet concentrated on the English rear squadron, while the French van of 30 ships steered away from the main action, engaging only in long-range fire with the 10 major and five small Dutch ships of Adriaen Banckert's squadron from the Admiralty of Zeeland. Although the battle was tactically indecisive, it disrupted Anglo-French plans to blockade Dutch ports and land soldiers on the Dutch coast, and also created dissention between the allies, so was a strategic victory for De Ruyter. D'Estrées was condemned, both by the English fleet and some of his own officers for steering away from the Dutch and failing to engage them closely.

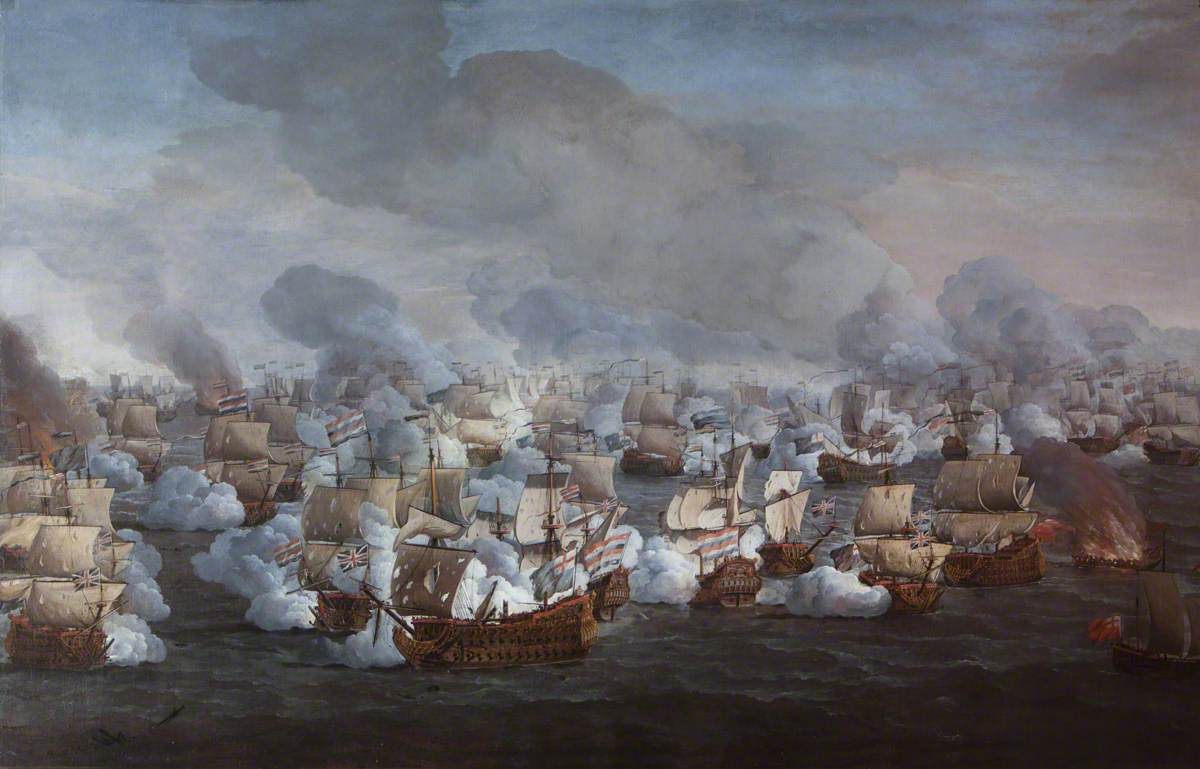
The Dutch naval victory over an Anglo-French fleet at the Battle of Texel, August 1673, was a key moment in ensuring Dutch survival.

The war on land went badly for the Dutch in 1672, which they called the Rampjaar or "disaster year", and this led to the resignation and then murder of Johan de Witt in August 1672 and the replacement of republicans by Orangists. De Ruyter was saddened by the killings of his friends, De Witt and his brother, but agreed to continue serving as commander of the fleet. He made an attempt to blockade the English fleet in the Thames with 30 ships in May 1673 but it had already put to sea, so he decided to rendezvous with the rest of the Dutch fleet in the coastal waters of the Schooneveld, where by late May he had assembled a fleet of 50 large ships together with frigates and fireships, 64 in total. These restricted waters neutralised the numerical advantages of the allied fleet, which had 81 ships of the line and several frigates, in the two Battles of the Schooneveld of 1673, he manoeuvered skillfully to damage the allied fleets sufficiently to force them to end their blockade of Dutch ports. Finally, at the Battle of Texel in August that year, De Ruyter's smaller fleet prevented the larger allied fleet landing troops on the Dutch coast and forced it to retreat. After the Battle of Texel, d'Estrées was accused by Prince Rupert of the Rhine, commanding the English fleet, of betraying it by fighting at long range against no more than ten Dutch ships. D'Estrées admitted later that Louis XIV had ordered him to protect the French fleet, in case England should make peace with the Dutch.

The new rank of lieutenant-admiral general was created especially for De Ruyter in February 1673, when the new stadtholder of Holland and Zeeland, William III of Orange, became admiral-general. Although successive Princes of Orange, when stadtholder, generally commanded the Dutch army in person as its captain-general, they never took command of the Dutch fleet as admiral-general.

By the end of 1673, English popular opposition to the war and to the French alliance, the changes in government policy and the likelihood that parliament would not continue to provide war funding inclined Charles II towards peace with Holland and ending his alliance with France. After relatively brief negotiations, the Treaty of Westminster ending the war was ratified in March 1674.

== War against France ==
The English withdrawal did not end naval engagements in the Franco-Dutch War. As Louis XIV did not wish to send his main fleet against the more powerful Dutch, De Ruyter was first instructed to use his fleet in support in a 'descent' on the French Channel and Biscay coasts, in which the appearance of the fleet would create a threat of landings or an invasion, aiming to divert French forces from the Spanish Netherlands and the Rhine.

In a further attempt to relieve pressure on the Netherlands, he was next ordered to take the fight against the French to the Caribbean. He arrived off Fort Royal, Martinique aboard his flagship De Zeven Provinciën on 19 July 1674, leading a substantial force of eighteen warships, nine storeships, and fifteen troop transports bearing 3,400 soldiers. However, although his destination was supposed to be secret, news had leaked out and had been sent to the French governor, which allowed the greatly outnumbered French defenders time to prepare a strong defensive position. When the Dutch troops went ashore the next day to attempt an assault on Fort Royal, they suffered significant casualties in their attempt to reach the French fortifications, including the loss of most of their senior officers, and they returned to the fleet with 143 killed and 318 wounded, compared to only 15 French defenders lost. With the element of surprise lost, and with disease spreading aboard his ships, de Ruyter decided against further attacks and returned to Europe.

In July 1674, the Messina revolt broke against Spanish rule and the people of Messina asked for French protection. A small French squadron was sent there in September 1674, but it withdrew before the year end in the face of a more numerous Spanish force. A stronger French force and supply convoy managed to break through the Spanish blockade and defeat the more numerous Spanish fleet in a battle off the Lipari Islands on 11 February 1675, ending the Spanish blockade of Messina, so the Spanish then asked for Dutch assistance. De Ruyter was sent to the Mediterranean later in 1675 with eighteen larger warships and a number of smaller vessels, although these vessels were not fully manned. De Ruyter thought the force that had been provided was insufficient for the task, and the shortage of money to repair damaged ships or build new ones or to recruit and pay sufficient sailors as the war continued was now a major problem for the Dutch fleet.

After a delay of two months on the Spanish coast waiting for the supplies and a supporting squadron promised by the Spanish authorities, De Ruyter sailed for Sicily at the year end with only one Spanish ship added to his fleet of 18 Dutch warships. When he arrived in Sicily in early January 1676, most of the larger French warships were absent from Messina with Duquesne, who was escorting a reprovisioning convoy to Sicily, and only some smaller French ships remained at Messina. However, de Ruyter was unable to attack the city because of contrary winds and, on 7 January 1676, while cruising near the Lipari Islands and accompanied by several Spanish galleys, he encountered the French fleet led by Duquesne the convoy. Although both fleets had similar numbers of ships, the French fleet was more powerful, with 1,500 guns against 1,200 for the Dutch and no fighting took place on 7 January, when De Ruyter held the weather gauge. However, the wind strengthened overnight, forcing the Spanish galleys to seek shelter, and veered to a west-southwesterly direction that favoured the French. Duquesne therefore sent the convoy ahead and prepared to attack the Dutch.

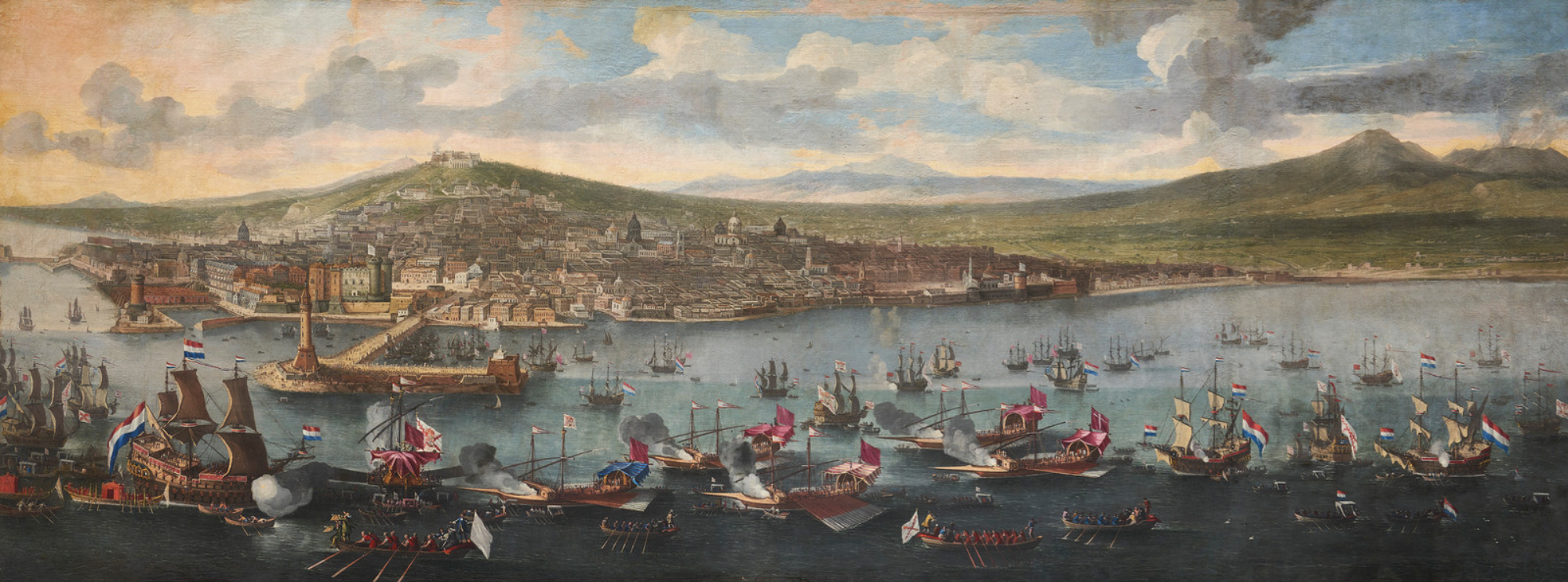
The Viceroy of Naples pays tribute to De Ruyter's fleet in Naples after the Battle of Stromboli by Jan van Essen

During the Battle of Stromboli on 8 January 1676, Duquesne's ships steered obliquely towards the Dutch fleet, which exposed them to Dutch broadside fire: De Ruyter's van and centre maintained their distance by gradually giving way, keeping their French opponents under heavy gunfire and causing significant damage and casualties. The French van squadron was disordered, and two of its ships had to pull out of line of battle, until Duquesne managed to restore order. He then tried several times to break the Dutch line, although De Ruyter's close linear formation and the weight of Dutch broadsides prevented this. After several hours fighting, the wind had become very light and the French ceased their attacks. De Ruyter disengaged and took his fleet into Milazzo with three badly damaged ships towed there by Spanish galleys. He had successfully defended his inferior fleet in a tactically disadvantageous leeward position and inflicted significant damage on the French fleet.

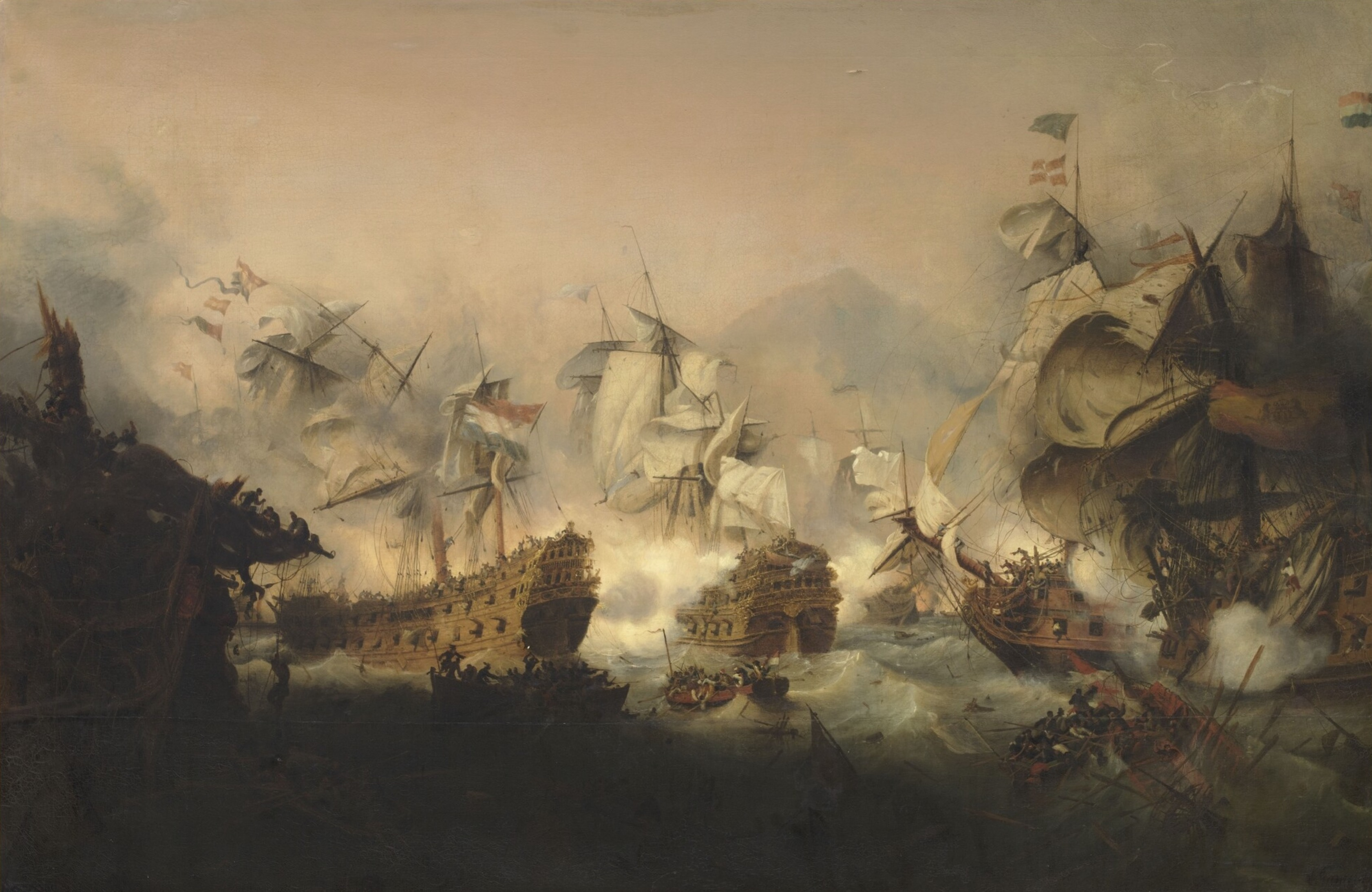
Battle of Augusta in April 1676

During the night, the wind strengthened again, and Duquesne was joined by eight ships from Messina, but the next day the Spanish squadron was sighted and Duquesne did not wish to fight an action against superior numbers in the Straits of Messina, so he took his convoy right around Sicily, bringing it into Messina without further fighting. The combined Dutch-Spanish fleet sailed to Palermo for repairs, and there were no further fleet actions for several months.

After the Battle of Stromboli, De Ruyter was joined by a Spanish squadron and relinquished command of the combined fleet to the Spanish admiral, Don Francisco de la Cerda. In order to attack Messina, the allies had to defeat the French fleet, and they decided to attack Augusta to force the French warships to leave Messina harbour. The attack on Augusta had the desired effect, and on 22 April 1676, the two fleets met north of Augusta. De Ruyter commanded the van squadron, the Spanish ships formed the centre, with another Dutch squadrons in the van rear. There were 29 French ships of the line and 13 Dutch warships, not all fit to fight in line. Jenkins mentions between ten and fourteen Spanish warships, besides frigates and fireships, supporting the Dutch, and the French fleet was superior in firepower as well as numbers.

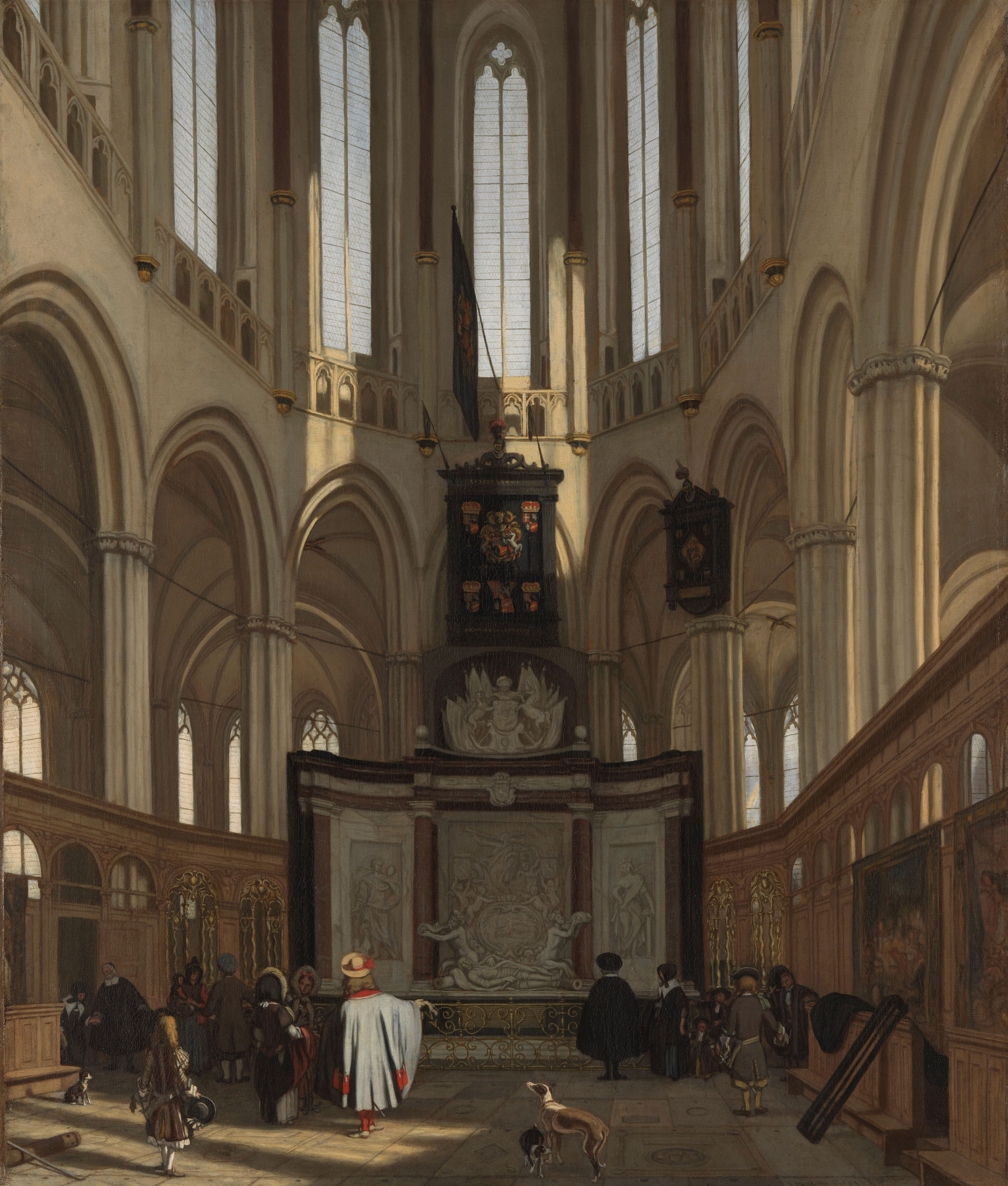
Tomb in the Nieuwe Kerk in Amsterdam, made by Rombout Verhulst and painted by Emanuel de Witte

The battle largely consisted of a fierce fight between the two vans, as the Spanish centre remained at long range from its French counterpart, with some ships in the rear squadrons also engaging each other. The inactivity of the Spanish centre enabled the leading ships of Duquesne's centre to attack on de Ruyter's outnumbered van squadron although the Dutch withstood these attacks, and de Ruyter attacked Duquesne's ship with the intention of boarding it, but was prevented when two French ships went to their admiral's assistance. At the end of the battle, De Ruyter was able to extract his squadron by his own seamanship and the assistance of the Dutch rear squadron.

=== Death ===
During the course of the Dutch van squadron's disengagement from fighting, De Ruyter was fatally wounded when a cannonball struck him in the leg, and he died a week later at Syracuse. His entrails were separated from his body and buried in Syracuse, Sicily. It is recorded that his French opponents honoured him by firing salutes as the ship carrying his embalmed body to the Netherlands passed the French fleet. On 18 March 1677, de Ruyter was given an elaborate state funeral. On that occasion, the Amsterdam professor Petrus Francius recited a Latin farewell poem of nearly a thousand hexameters. His body was buried in the Nieuwe Kerk in Amsterdam. The funeral monument completed in 1681, designed and created by the Flemish sculptor Rombout Verhulst. He was succeeded as supreme commander by Cornelis Tromp in 1679.

== Legacy ==
Coat of arms of Michiel Adriaenszoon de Ruyter

De Ruyter was highly respected by his sailors and soldiers, who used the term of endearment bestevaêr ("grandfather") for him, both because of his disregard for hierarchy, as he was himself of humble origin, and his refusal to turn away from risky and bold undertakings, despite his usually cautious nature. He is honoured by a statue in his birthplace, Vlissingen, which stands looking over the sea. Multiple towns in the Netherlands have a street named after him. Respect also extended far beyond the borders of the republic. The town of Debrecen erected a statue of him for his role in persuading the Spanish viceroy of Naples to free 26 Protestant Hungarian ministers from slavery in the Spanish galleys during his service in Sicily.

Six Royal Netherlands Navy ships have been named HNLMS De Ruyter; seven are named after his flagship, HNLMS De Zeven Provinciën. De Ruyter was involved in the founding of the Netherlands Marine Corps, established on 10 December 1665. The intended new base for the marine corps, which was to be built in his birthplace of Vlissingen, completed by 2020 and to be named "Michiel de Ruyter Kazerne" was cancelled over financial concerns and fears that many marines would leave the service rather than transfer to Zeeland.

In 1954, the Netherlands issued two postage stamps to honour Admiral de Ruyter. A 2015 Biographical film, Michiel de Ruyter (also released as The Admiral), starred Frank Lammers. It dealt with the latter part of his life, both at sea and with his family, as well as his relationships with the leading figures in the Dutch government.

The town of DeRuyter, New York, United States, and a village of the same name within the town are both named after him.

== Bibliography ==
- Blackmore, David S. T. (2014). Warfare on the Mediterranean in the Age of Sail: A History, 1571–1866. Jefferson: McFarland. ISBN 978-0-78645-7847.
- Boxer, C. R. (1969). "Some Second Thoughts on the Third Anglo-Dutch War, 1672–1674". Trans. R. Hist. Soc. 19: 67–94. doi:10.2307/3678740. JSTOR 3678740. S2CID 159934682.
- Bruijn, J. R. (1989). "William III and His Two Navies". Notes and Records of the Royal Society of London. 43 (2): 117–132. doi:10.1098/rsnr.1989.0010. JSTOR 531378. S2CID 146439185.
- Bruijn, J. R. (1993). The Dutch Navy of the Seventeenth and Eighteenth Centuries. Columbia: University of South Carolina Press. ISBN 978-0-87249-8754.
- Bruijn, J. R. (2011). De Ruyter: Dutch Admiral. Rotterdam: Karwansaray. ISBN 978-9-49025-8030.
- Fox, F. L. (2018). The Four Days' Battle of 1666. Barnsley: Seaforth. ISBN 978-1-52673-7274.
- Hainsworth, David Roger; Churches, Christine (1998). The Anglo-Dutch Naval Wars 1652–1674. Sutton Pub. ISBN 978-0-75091-7872.
- Hellinga, G. G. (2006). Geschiedenis van Nederland (in Dutch). Zutphen: Walburg Pers. ISBN 978-9-05730-6006.
- Jenkins, E. H. (1973). A History of the French Navy. London: MacDonald and Jane's. ISBN 978-0-78645-7847.
- Jones, J. R. (1988). "The Dutch Navy and National Survival in the Seventeenth Century". The International History Review. 10 (1): 18–32. doi:10.1080/07075332.1988.9640466. JSTOR 40107087.
- Kloster, W. (2016). The Dutch Moment: War, Trade, and Settlement in the Seventeenth-Century Atlantic World. Ithaca: Cornell University Press. ISBN 978-1-50170-6677.
- Palmer, M. A. (2005). Command at Sea. Cambridge, Mass: Harvard University Press. ISBN 978-0-67402-4113.
- Prud'homme van Reine, R. (1996). Rechterhand van Nederland (in Dutch). Amsterdam: De Arbeiderspers. ISBN 978-9-02953-4864.
- Rommelse, Gijs (2006). The Second Anglo-Dutch War (1665–1667): raison d'état, mercantilism and maritime strife. Uitgeverij Verloren. ISBN 978-9-06550-9079.
- Rowen, H. H (2015). John de Witt, Grand Pensionary of Holland, 1625–1672. Princeton: Princeton University Press. ISBN 978-0-98649-7353.
- Warner, O. (1963). Great Sea Battles. London: Weidenfeld & Nicolson. OCLC 19071303.
- Warnsinck, J. C. M. (1941). Van vlootvoogden en zeeslagen (in Dutch). Amsterdam: Van Kampen. OCLC 1067798443.
- Young, W. (2004). International Politics and Warfare in the Age of Louis XIV and Peter the Great. Bloomington: iUniverse. ISBN 978-0-59532-9922.
- Blok, P.J. (1928). Michiel de Ruyter (PDF) (in Dutch). Martinus Nijhof.
