= Brouncker =

Brouncker is a surname. Notable people with the surname include:

- Edward Brouncker (fl. early 17th-century), Anglican priest
- Henry Brouncker (disambiguation), multiple people
- William Brouncker (disambiguation), multiple people

== See also ==
- Viscount Brouncker
