= William Brouncker =

William Brouncker may refer to:

- Sir William Brouncker (Wiltshire MP, died 1596) (c. 1547–1596), English landowner, lawyer and MP for Westbury and Wiltshire
- William Brouncker, 1st Viscount Brouncker (1585–1645), English courtier, nephew of the above
- William Brouncker, 2nd Viscount Brouncker (1620–1684), English mathematician, son of the above
- William Brouncker (Westbury MP, died 1680) (c. 1620–1680), English landowner and MP for Westbury, great-grandson of Sir William Brouncker
