= Henry Brouncker =

Henry Brouncker may refer to:

- Sir Henry Brouncker (courtier, died 1607) (c. 1550–1607), English courtier, soldier and MP
- Henry Brouncker, 3rd Viscount Brouncker (c. 1627–1688), English courtier, grandson of the above
