= Raid on the Medway =

1667 Second Anglo-Dutch War battle

- Part of the Second Anglo-Dutch War
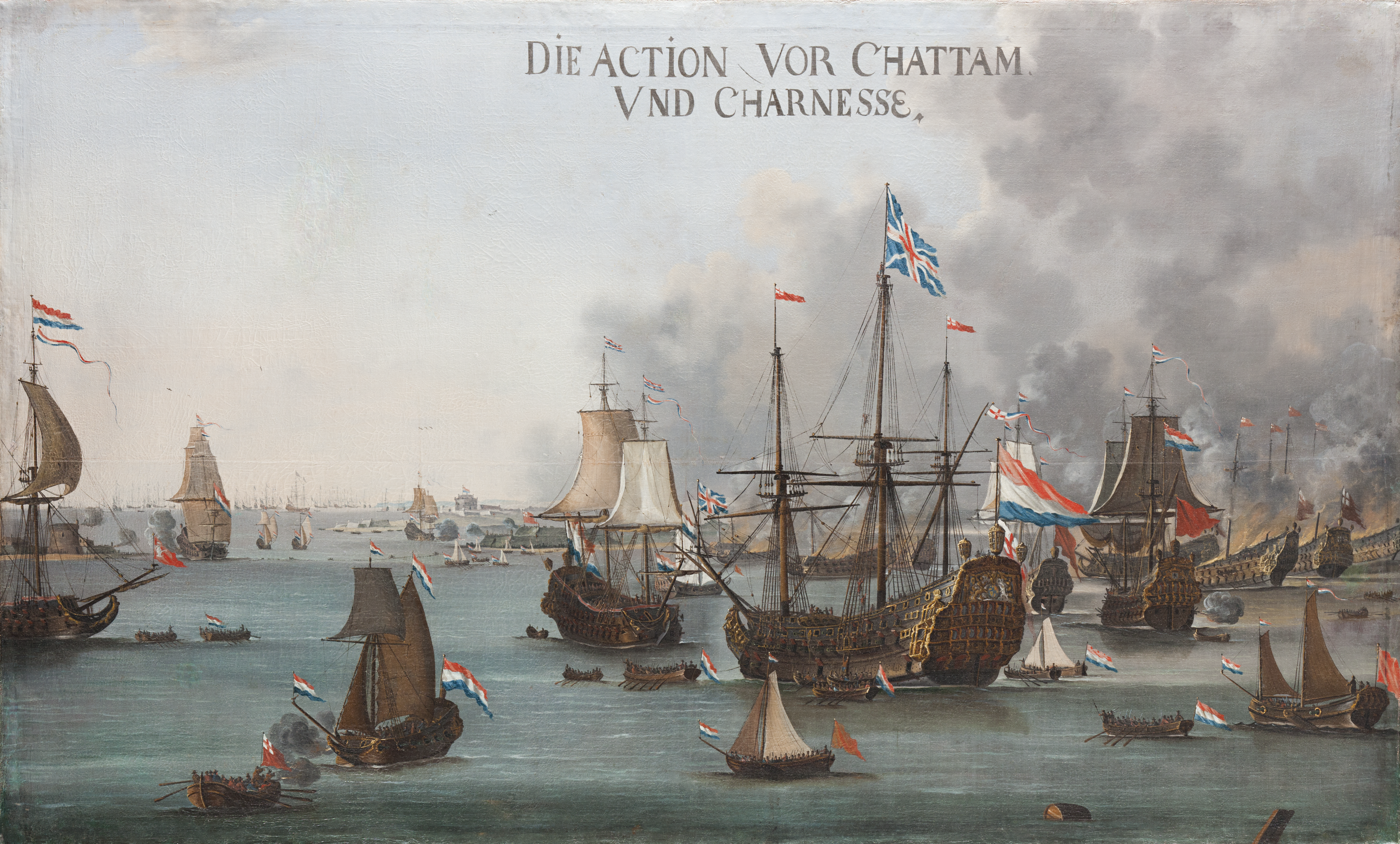
- Attack On The Medway, June 1667; Willem van der Stoop
Date	19–24 June 1667
Location	Chatham, Medway, England 51.4039°N 0.531944°E
Result	Dutch victory

Belligerents
Dutch Republic	Kingdom of England

Commanders and leaders
Michiel de Ruyter; Cornelis de Witt; Willem van Ghent; Aert Jansse van Nes	Prince Rupert of the Rhine; George Monck

Strength
17,500 men; 62 warships; 15 smaller ships; 12 fire ships	several ships; fort garrisons

Casualties and losses
50–150 men killed or wounded; 8 fireships expended	500 men killed or wounded; 13 ships destroyed; 2 ships captured; 30 ships scuttled
- Location within England

The Raid on the Medway, during the Second Anglo-Dutch War between June 12 to 14 June 1667, (June 22 to June 24 Gregorian modern calendar) was a successful attack conducted by the Dutch navy on English warships laid up in the fleet anchorages off Chatham Dockyard and Gillingham in the county of Kent. At the time, the fortress of Upnor Castle and a barrier chain called the "Gillingham Line" were supposed to protect the English ships.

The Dutch, under nominal command of Willem Joseph van Ghent and Lieutenant-Admiral Michiel de Ruyter, over several days bombarded and captured the town of Sheerness, sailed up the Thames Estuary to Gravesend, then sailed into the River Medway to Chatham and Gillingham, where they engaged fortifications with cannon fire, burned or captured three capital ships and ten more ships of the line, and captured and towed away the flagship of the English fleet, HMS Royal Charles, the stern of which is still on display at the Rijksmuseum in Amsterdam.

Politically, the raid was disastrous for the war plans of Charles II of England. It led to a quick end to the war, and a favourable peace for the Dutch. The raid was one of the worst defeats in both the history of the Royal Navy and British military history more broadly speaking. Horace George Franks called it the "most serious defeat it has ever had in its home waters."

== Prelude ==
In 1667 Charles II's active fleet was in a reduced state due to recent expenditure restrictions, with the remaining "big ships" laid up. The Dutch seized this opportunity to attack the English. They had made earlier plans for such an attack in 1666 after the Four Days' Battle but were prevented from carrying them out by their defeat in the St James's Day Battle. The mastermind behind the plan was the leading Dutch politician Grand Pensionary Johan de Witt. His brother Cornelis de Witt accompanied the fleet to supervise. Peace negotiations had been in progress at Breda since March, but Charles had been procrastinating over the signing of peace, hoping to improve his position through secret French assistance. Based on these assumptions De Witt thought it best to end the war quickly with a clear victory, thereby ensuring a more advantageous settlement for the Dutch Republic. Most Dutch flag officers had strong doubts about the feasibility of such a daring attack, fearing the treacherous shoals in the Thames Estuary, but they obeyed orders nevertheless. The Dutch made use of two English pilots who had defected, one a dissenter named Robert Holland, the other a smuggler who had fled English justice.

== Raid ==
=== Dutch approach ===
On 17 May the squadron of the Admiralty of Rotterdam with De Ruyter sailed to Texel to join those of Amsterdam and the Northern Quarter. Hearing that the squadron of Frisia was not yet ready because of recruiting problems (impressment being forbidden in the Republic), he left for the Schooneveld off the Dutch coast to join the squadron of Zealand that, however, suffered from similar problems. De Ruyter then departed for the Thames on 4 June (Old Style used by the English, the Dutch at the time were officially using New Style dates) with 62 frigates or ships-of-the-line, about fifteen lighter ships and twelve fireships, when the wind turned to the east. The fleet was reorganised into three squadrons: the first was commanded by De Ruyter himself, with as Vice-Admiral Johan de Liefde and Rear-Admiral Jan Jansse van Nes; the second was commanded by Lieutenant-Admiral Aert Jansse van Nes with as Vice-Admiral Enno Doedes Star and Rear-Admiral Willem van der Zaan; the third was commanded by Lieutenant-Admiral Baron Willem Joseph van Ghent with Lieutenant-Admiral Jan van Meppel in subcommand and as Vice-Admirals Isaac Sweers and Volckert Schram and as Rear-Admirals David Vlugh and Jan Gideonsz Verburgh. The third squadron thus effectively had a second set of commanders; this was done to use these as flag officers of a special frigate landing force, to be formed on arrival and to be headed by Colonel and Lieutenant-Admiral Van Ghent, on the frigate Agatha. Baron Van Ghent was in fact the real commander of the expedition and had done all the operational planning, as he had been the former commander of the Dutch Marine Corps (the first corps in history to be specialised in amphibious operations) that now was headed by the Englishman Colonel Thomas Dolman.

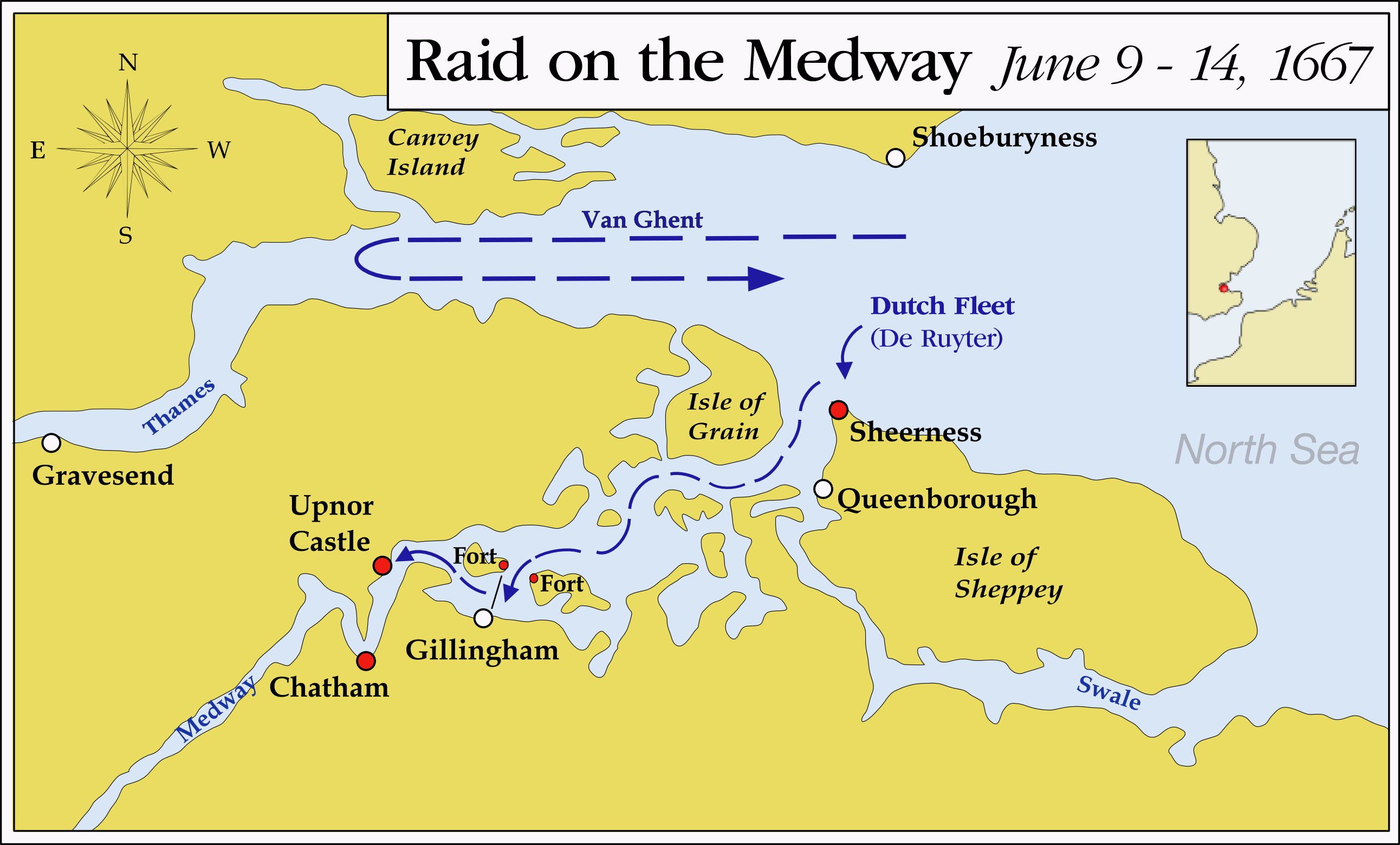
Map showing the events

On 6 June a fog bank was blown away and revealed the Dutch task force, sailing into the mouth of the Thames. On 7 June Cornelis de Witt revealed his secret instructions from the States General, written on 20 May, in the presence of all commanders. There were so many objections, while De Ruyter's only substantial contribution to the discussion was "bevelen zijn bevelen" ("orders are orders"), that Cornelis, after retiring to his cabin late in the night, wrote in his daily report he did not feel at all sure that he would be obeyed. The next day it transpired however that most officers were in for a bit of adventure; they had just given their professional opinion for the record so they could blame the politicians should the whole enterprise end in disaster. That day an attempt was made to capture a fleet of twenty English merchantmen seen higher up the Thames in the direction of London, but this failed as these fled to the west, beyond Gravesend.

The attack caught the English unaware. No serious preparations had been made for such an eventuality, although there had been ample warning from the extensive English spy network. Most frigates were assembled in squadrons at Harwich and in Scotland, leaving the London area to be protected by only a small number of active ships, most of them prizes taken earlier in the war from the Dutch. As a further measure of economy, on 24 March the Duke of York had ordered the discharge of most of the crews of the prize vessels, leaving only three guard ships at the Medway; in compensation the crew of one of them, the frigate Unity (former Eendracht, the first ship to be captured from the Dutch in 1665, from the privateer Cornelis Evertsen the Youngest) was raised from forty to sixty; also the number of fireships was increased from one to three. Additionally thirty large sloops were to be prepared to row any ship to safety in case of an emergency. Sir William Coventry declared that a Dutch landing near London was very unlikely; at most the Dutch, to bolster their morale, would launch a token attack at some medium-sized and exposed target like Harwich, which place therefore had been strongly fortified in the spring. There was no clear line of command with most responsible authorities giving hasty orders without bothering to co-ordinate them first.

As a result, there was much confusion. Charles did not take matters into his own hands, deferring mostly to the opinion of others. English morale was low. Not having been paid for months or even years, most sailors and soldiers were less than enthusiastic to risk their lives. England had only a small army and the few available units were dispersed as Dutch intentions were unclear. This explains why no effective countermeasures were taken though it took the Dutch about five days to reach Chatham, slowly maneuvering through the shoals, leaving the heavier vessels behind as a covering force. They could only advance in jumps when the tide was favourable.

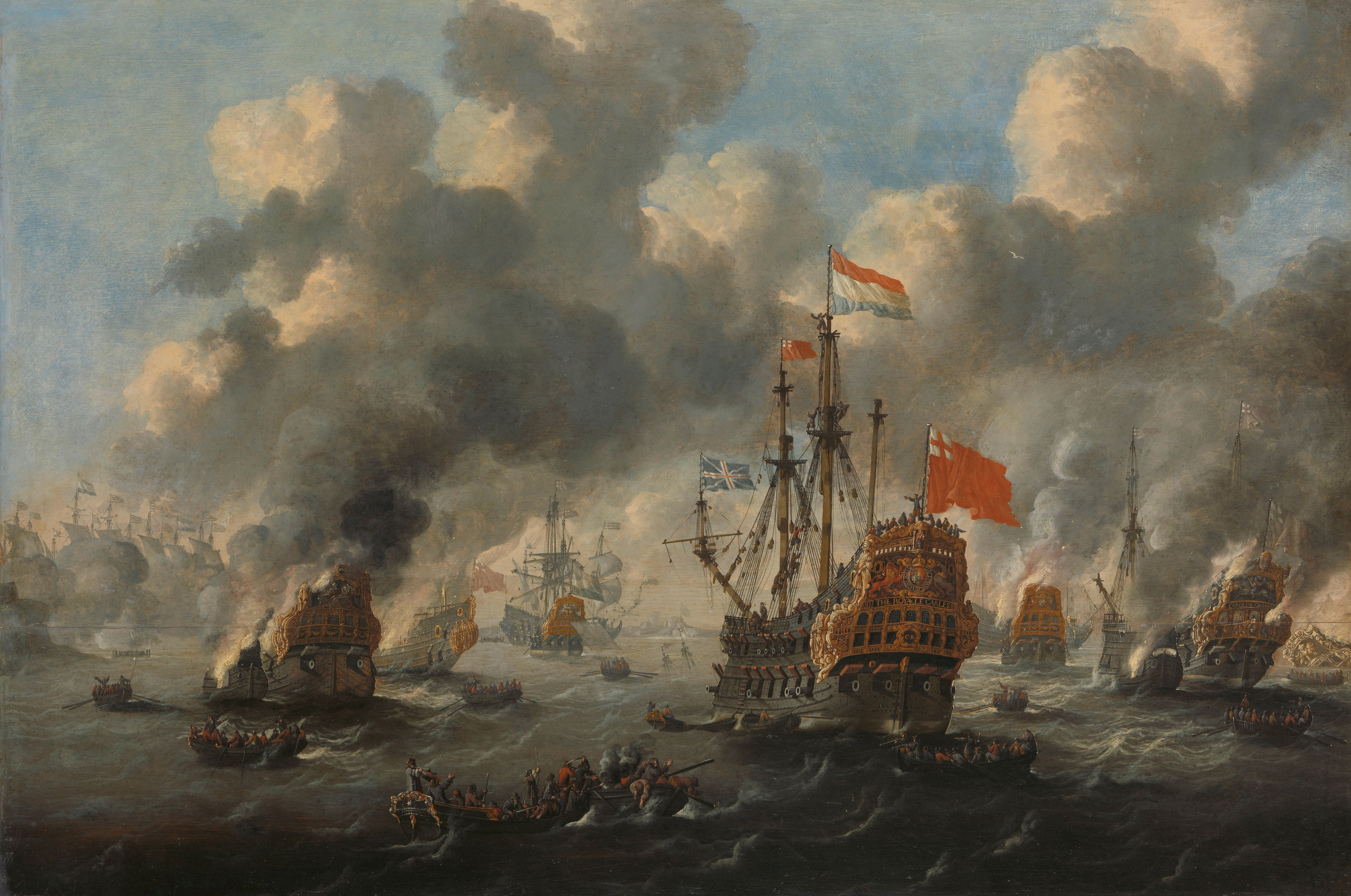
The burning of the English fleet off Chatham, 20 June 1667, likely painted by Willem van de Velde the Younger

After raising the alarm on 6 June at Chatham Dockyard, Commissioner Peter Pett seems not to have taken any further action until 9 June when, late in the afternoon, a fleet of about thirty Dutch ships was sighted in the Thames off Sheerness. At this point the Commissioner immediately sought assistance from the Admiralty, sending a pessimistic message to the Navy Board, lamenting the absence of Navy senior officials whose help and advice he believed he needed. The thirty ships were those of Van Ghent's squadron of frigates. The Dutch fleet carried about a thousand marines and landing parties were dispatched to Canvey Island in Essex and opposite on the Kent side at Sheerness. These men had strict orders by Cornelis de Witt not to plunder, as the Dutch wanted to shame the English whose troops had sacked Terschelling during Holmes's Bonfire in August 1666. Nevertheless, the crew of Captain Jan van Brakel could not control themselves. They were driven off by English militia, and found themselves under threat of severe punishment upon returning to the Dutch fleet. Van Brakel offered to lead the attack the next day to avoid the penalty.

Charles ordered the Earl of Oxford on 8 June to mobilise the militia of all counties around London; also all available barges should be used to lay a ship's bridge across the Lower Thames, so that the English cavalry could quickly switch positions from one bank to the other. Sir Edward Spragge, the Vice-Admiral, learned on 9 June that a Dutch raiding party had come ashore on the Isle of Grain (a peninsula where the river Medway in Kent, meets the River Thames). Musketeers from the Sheerness garrison opposite were sent to investigate.

Only in the afternoon of 10 June did Charles instruct Admiral George Monck, Duke of Albemarle to go to Chatham to take charge of matters, a full three days later ordering Admiral Prince Rupert to organise the defences at Woolwich. Albemarle went first to Gravesend where he noted to his dismay that there and at Tilbury only a few guns were present, too few to halt a possible Dutch advance upon the Thames. To prevent such a disaster, he ordered all available artillery from the capital to be positioned at Gravesend. On 11 June (Old Style) he went to Chatham, expecting the place to be well prepared for an attack. Two members of the Navy Board, Sir John Mennes and Lord Henry Brouncker, had already travelled there on the same day. When Albemarle arrived, however, he found only twelve of the eight hundred dockyard men expected and these in a state of panic; of the thirty sloops only ten were present, the other twenty having been used to evacuate the personal possessions of several officials, such as Pett's ship models. No munitions or powder were available and the six-inch-thick iron chain built as a navigational barrier across the Medway had not yet been protected by batteries. This chain system had been built during the English Civil War to repel a possible attack by the Royalist fleet, replacing earlier versions, the first dating back to 1585. Albemarle immediately ordered the artillery to be moved from Gravesend to Chatham, which would take a day.

=== Attack ===
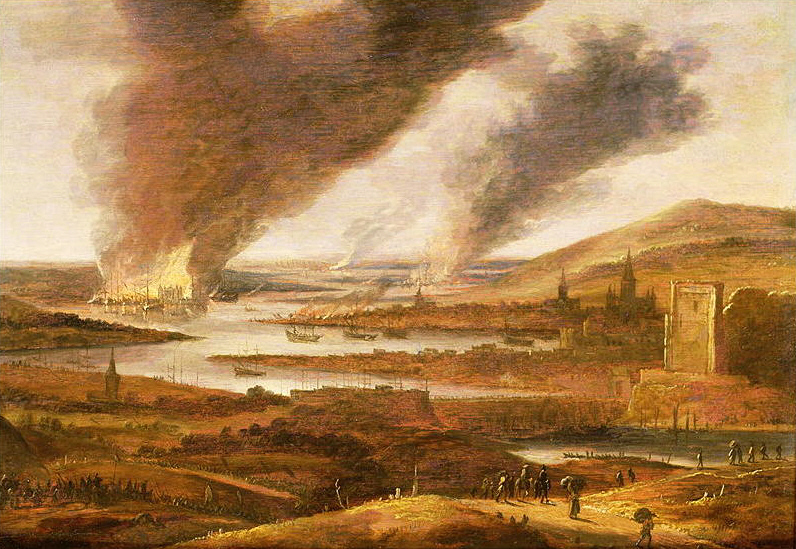
A picture by Willem Schellincks of the raid. The view is from the south. On the left Upnor Castle is silhouetted against the flames; on the opposite side of the river more to the front the burning dockyard of Chatham. To the north the conflagration near the chain is shown and on the horizon the ruins of Sheerness Fort are still smoking.

The Dutch fleet arrived at the Isle of Sheppey on 10 June, and launched an attack on the incomplete Garrison Point Fort. Captain Jan van Brakel in Vrede, ("peace") followed by two other men-of-war, sailed as close to the fort as possible to engage it with cannon fire. Sir Edward Spragge was in command of the ships at anchor in the Medway and those off Sheerness, but the only ship able to defend against the Dutch was the frigate Unity, which was stationed off the fort.

Unity was supported by a number of ketches and fireships at Garrison Point, and by the fort, where sixteen guns had been hastily placed. Unity fired one broadside, but then, when attacked by a Dutch fireship, she withdrew up the Medway, followed by the English fireships and ketches. The Dutch fired on the fort; two men were hit. It then transpired that no surgeon was available and most of the soldiers of the Scottish garrison now deserted. Seven remained, but their position became untenable when some 800 Dutch marines landed about a mile away. With Sheerness thus lost, its guns being captured by the Dutch and the building blown up, Spragge sailed up river for Chatham on his yacht Henrietta. Many officers were now assembled there: Spragge himself, the next day also Monck and several men of the admiralty board. All gave orders countermanding those of the others so that utter confusion reigned.

As his artillery would not arrive soon, Monck on the 11th ordered a squadron of cavalry and a company of soldiers to reinforce Upnor Castle. River defences were hastily improvised with blockships sunk, and the chain across the river was guarded by light batteries. Pett proposed that several big and smaller ships be sunk to block the Musselbank channel in front of the chain. This way the large Golden Phoenix and House of Sweden (the former VOC ships Gulden Phenix and Huis van Swieten) and Welcome and Leicester were lost and the smaller Constant John, Unicorn and John and Sarah; when this was shown by Spragge to be insufficient, personally sounding the depth of a second channel despite the assurances by Pett, they were joined by Barbados Merchant, Dolphin, Edward and Eve, Hind and Fortune. To do this the men first intended for the warships to be protected were used, so the most valuable ships were basically without crews. These blockships were placed in a rather easterly position, on the line Upchurch–Stoke, and could not be covered by fire. Monck then decided also to sink blockships in Upnor Reach near Upnor Castle, presenting another barrier to the Dutch should they break through the chain at Gillingham. The defensive chain placed across the river had at its lowest point been lying practically nine feet (about three metres) under the water between its stages, owing to its weight, so it was still possible for light ships to pass it. Attempts were made to raise it by placing stages under it closer to the shore.

The positions of Charles V and Matthias (former Dutch merchantmen Carolus Quintus and Geldersche Ruyter), just above the chain were adjusted to enable them to bring their broadsides to bear upon it. Monmouth was also moored above the chain, positioned so that she could bring her guns to bear on the space between Charles V and Matthias. The frigate Marmaduke and Norway Merchant were sunk above the chain; the large Sancta Maria (former VOC ship Slot van Honingen of 70 cannon) foundered while being moved for the same purpose. Pett also informed Monck that Royal Charles had to be moved upriver. He had been ordered by the Duke of York on 27 March to do this, but as yet had not complied. Monck at first refused to make available some of his small number of sloops, as they were needed to move supplies; when he at last found the captain of Matthias willing to assist, Pett answered that it was too late as he was busy sinking the blockships and there was no pilot to be found daring to take such a risk anyway. Meanwhile, the first Dutch frigates to arrive had already begun to move the Edward and Eve away, clearing a channel by nightfall.

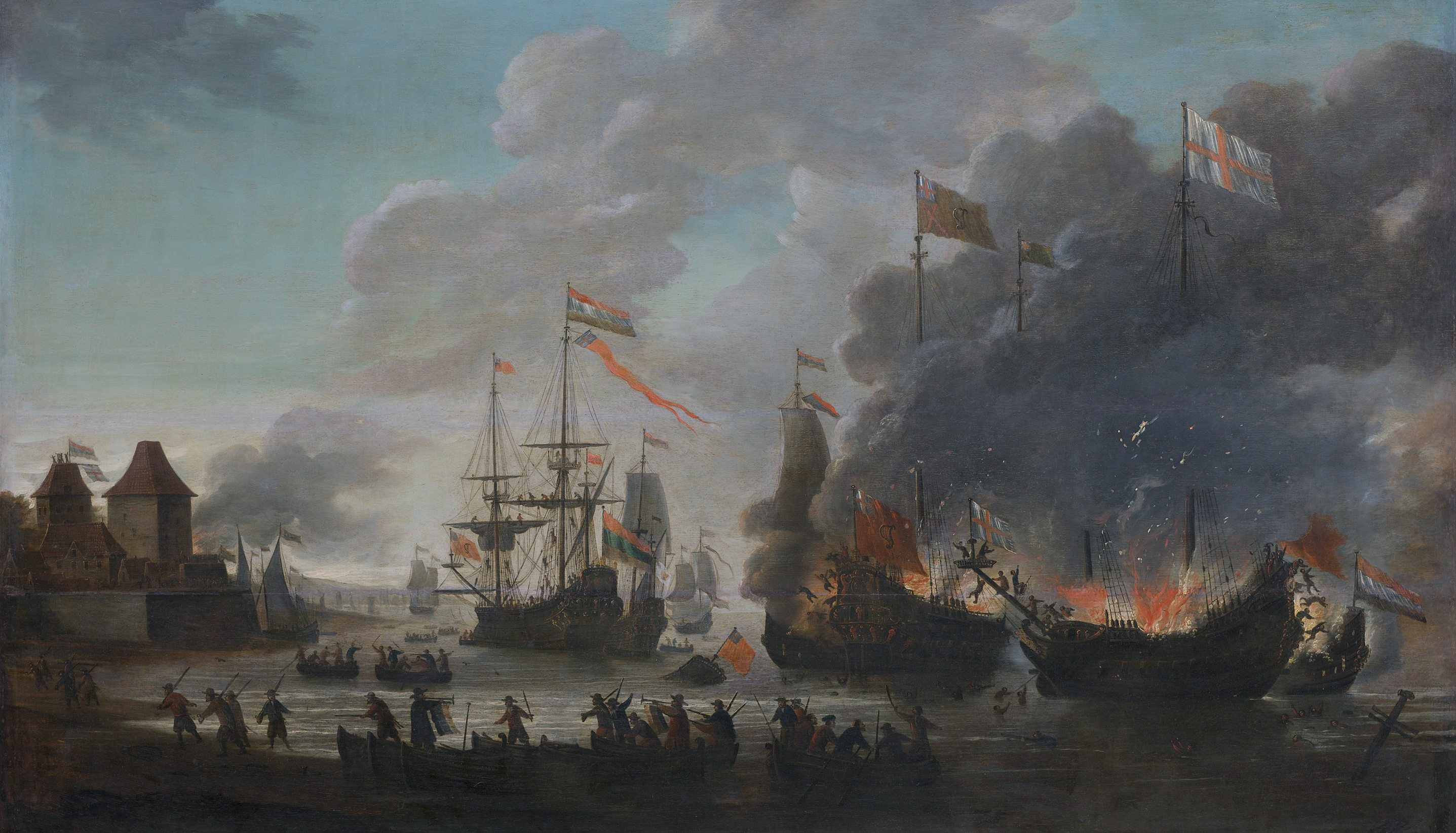
"Burning English ships" by Jan van Leyden. Shown are the events near Gillingham: in the middle Royal Charles is taken; on the right Pro Patria and Schiedam set Matthias and Charles V alight

Van Ghent's squadron now advanced up the Medway on 12 June, attacking the English defences at the chain. First Unity was taken by Van Brakel by assault. Then the fireship Pro Patria under commander Jan Daniëlsz van Rijn broke through the chain. According to Dutch eyewitness Otto de Vooght and 17th century historian Gerard Brandt the chain was broken by a landing party of Dutch engineers commanded by Rear-Admiral David Vlugh using hammers. The more spectacular traditional version of events can be traced to a play by Joost van den Vondel.

Next the Matthias was destroyed by fire. The fireships Catharina and Schiedam attacked Charles V; Catharina under commander Hendrik Hendriksz was sunk by the shore batteries but Schiedam under commander Gerrit Andriesz Mak set Charles V alight; the crew was captured by Van Brakel. Royal Charles, with only thirty cannon aboard and abandoned by her skeleton crew when they saw Matthias burn, was then captured by the Irishman Thomas Tobiasz, the flag captain of Vice-Admiral Johan de Liefde, and carried off to the Netherlands despite an unfavourable tide. This was made possible by lowering her draft by bringing her into a slight tilt. The jack was struck while a trumpeter played "Joan's placket is torn". Only Monmouth escaped. Seeing the disaster Monck ordered all sixteen remaining warships further up to be sunk to prevent them from being captured, making for a total of about thirty ships deliberately sunk by the English themselves. As Andrew Marvell satirised:

Of all our navy none should now survive,
But that the ships themselves were taught to dive

On 13 June, the whole of the Thames side as far up as London was in a panic—some spread the rumour that the Dutch were in the process of transporting a French army from Dunkirk for a full-scale invasion—and many wealthy citizens fled the city, taking their most valuable possessions with them. The Dutch continued their advance into the Chatham docks with the fireships Delft, Rotterdam, Draak, Wapen van Londen, Gouden Appel and Princess, under English fire from Upnor Castle and from three shore batteries. A number of Dutch frigates suppressed the English fire, themselves suffering about forty casualties in dead and wounded. Three of the finest and heaviest vessels in the navy, already sunk to prevent capture, now perished by fire: first Loyal London, set alight by Rotterdam under commander Cornelis Jacobsz van der Hoeven; then Royal James and finally Royal Oak, that withstood attempts by two fireships but was burnt by a third. The English crews abandoned their half-flooded ships, mostly without a fight, a notable exception being army Captain Archibald Douglas, of the Scots Foot, who personally refused to abandon Royal Oak and perished in the flames. Monmouth again escaped. The raid thus cost the English four of their remaining eight ships with more than 75 cannon. Three of the four largest "big ships" of the navy were lost. The remaining "big ship", Royal Sovereign, was preserved due to her being at Portsmouth at the time. De Ruyter now joined Van Ghent's squadron in person.

== Account by Samuel Pepys ==
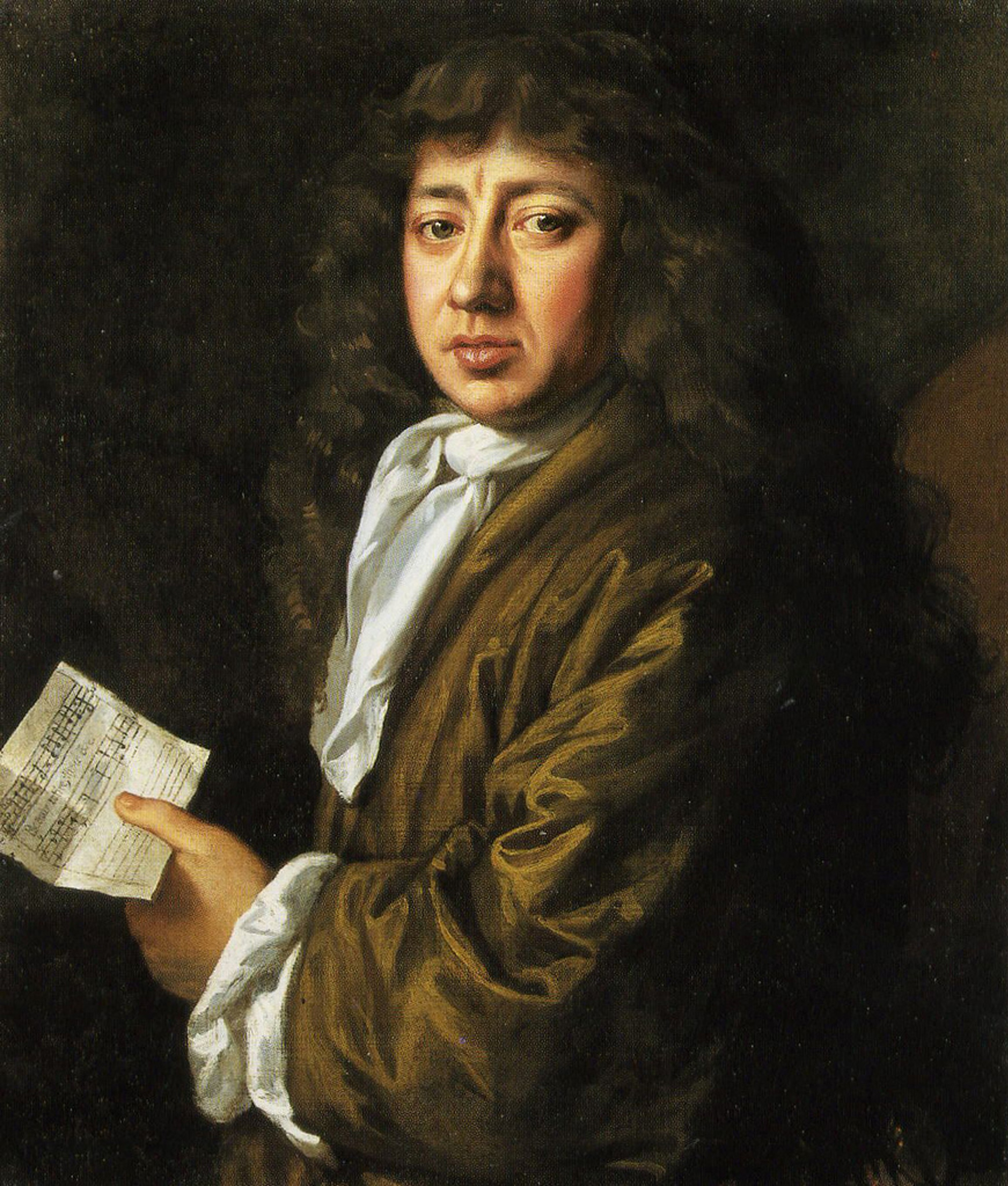
Portrait of Samuel Pepys by J. Hayls

The diary of Samuel Pepys, as secretary of the Navy Board, is often cited in descriptions of the raid, as it gives direct information about the attitude of the policy makers in this period and of the psychological impact of the attack.

Pepys at first seems to accept the consensus that the Dutch would not dare to launch an expedition against the London area; still on 18 April he writes:

(...)then to the office, where the news is strong that not only the Dutch cannot set out a fleete this year, but that the French will not, and that he [Louis XIV] hath given the answer to the Dutch Embassador, saying that he is for the King of England's having an honourable peace, which, if true, is the best news we have had a good while.

At that moment De Ruyter had already been on De Zeven Provinciën for a week. Nevertheless, he is aware of the preparations at Chatham, writing on 23 March:

At the office all the morning, where Sir W. Pen [sic] come, being returned from Chatham, from considering the means of fortifying the river Medway, by a chain at the stakes, and ships laid there with guns to keep the enemy from coming up to burn our ships; all our care now being to fortify ourselves against their invading us.

Also he is the next day present at the meeting where the details are given:

All their care they now take is to fortify themselves, and are not ashamed of it: for when by and by my Lord Arlington come in with letters, and seeing the King and Duke of York give us and the officers of the Ordnance directions in this matter, he did move that we might do it as privately as we could, that it might not come into the Dutch Gazette presently, as the King's and Duke of York's going down the other day to Sheerenesse was, the week after, in the Harlem Gazette. The King and Duke of York both laughed at it, and made no matter, but said, "Let us be safe, and let them talk, for there is nothing will trouble them more, nor will prevent their coming more, than to hear that we are fortifying ourselves".

Only on 3 June does Pepys become aware that the Dutch are out in force:

the Dutch are known to be abroad with eighty sail of ships of war, and twenty fire-ships; and the French come into the Channell with twenty sail of men-of-war, and five fireships, while we have not a ship at sea to do them any hurt with; but are calling in all we can, while our Embassadors are treating at Bredah; and the Dutch look upon them as come to beg peace, and use them accordingly; and all this through the negligence of our Prince, who hath power, if he would, to master all these with the money and men that he hath had the command of, and may now have, if he would mind his business.

Not until 10 June does Pepys understand that the Thames is the target: "News brought us that, the Dutch are come up as high as the Nore; and more pressing orders for fireships." The next day a growing sense of panic becomes apparent:

Up, and more letters still from Sir W. Coventry about more fire-ships, and so Sir W. Batten and I to the office, where Bruncker come to us, who is just now going to Chatham upon a desire of Commissioner Pett's, who is in a very fearful stink for fear of the Dutch, and desires help for God and the King and kingdom's sake. So Bruncker goes down, and Sir J. Minnes also, from Gravesend. This morning Pett writes us word that Sheernesse is lost last night, after two or three hours' dispute. The enemy hath possessed himself of that place; which is very sad, and puts us into great fears of Chatham.

In the morning of the 12th he is reassured by the measures taken by Monck: "(...) met Sir W. Coventry's boy; and there in his letter find that the Dutch had made no motion since their taking Sheernesse; and the Duke of Albemarle writes that all is safe as to the great ships against any assault, the boom and chaine being so fortified; which put my heart into great joy."

Soon, however, this confidence is shattered: "(...)his clerk, Powell, do tell me that ill newes is come to Court of the Dutch breaking the Chaine at Chatham; which struck me to the heart. And to White Hall to hear the truth of it; and there, going up the back-stairs, I did hear some lacquies speaking of sad newes come to Court, saying, that hardly anybody in the Court but do look as if he cried(...)."

Pepys immediately draws the conclusion that this will mean the end of Charles's regime and that a revolution is inevitable: "All our hearts do now ake; for the newes is true, that the Dutch have broke the chaine and burned our ships, and particularly "The Royal Charles", other particulars I know not, but most sad to be sure. And, the truth is, I do fear so much that the whole kingdom is undone, that I do this night resolve to study with my father and wife what to do with the little that I have in money by me(...)."

On the 13th, the countermeasures proposed only increase his fears and make him decide to take his family and capital to safety:

No sooner up but hear the sad newes confirmed of the Royall Charles being taken by them, and now in fitting by them—which Pett should have carried up higher by our several orders, and deserves, therefore, to be hanged for not doing it—and turning several others; and that another fleete is come up into the Hope. Upon which newes the King and Duke of York have been below [London Bridge] since four o'clock in the morning, to command the sinking of ships at Barking-Creeke, and other places, to stop their coming up higher: which put me into such a fear, that I presently resolved of my father's and wife's going into the country; and, at two hours' warning, they did go by the coach this day, with about £1300 in gold in their night-bag.

The entire city is in a state of panic:

(...)never were people so dejected as they are in the City all over at this day; and do talk most loudly, even treason; as, that we are bought and sold – that we are betrayed by the Papists, and others, about the King; cry out that the office of the Ordnance hath been so backward as no powder to have been at Chatham nor Upnor Castle till such a time, and the carriages all broken; that Legg is a Papist; that Upnor, the old good castle built by Queen Elizabeth, should be lately slighted; that the ships at Chatham should not be carried up higher. They look upon us as lost, and remove their families and rich goods in the City; and do think verily that the French, being come down with his army to Dunkirke, it is to invade us, and that we shall be invaded.

Then even worse news is brought: "Late at night comes Mr. Hudson, the cooper, my neighbour, and tells me that he come from Chatham this evening at five o'clock, and saw this afternoon "The Royal James," "Oake," and "London," burnt by the enemy with their fire-ships: that two or three men-of-war come up with them, and made no more of Upnor Castle's shooting, than of a fly(...)."

On the 14th more details become known of the events the previous day, showing the morale of the sailors: "[he] did hear many Englishmen aboard the Dutch ships speaking to one another in English, and that they did cry and say: 'We did heretofore fight for tickets; now we fight for dollars!' and did ask how such and such a one did, and would commend themselves to them: which is a sad consideration", and the mood of the people towards Charles "they did in open streets yesterday at Westminster, cry, 'A Parliament! a Parliament!'; and I do believe it will cost blood to answer for these miscarriages."

== The Dutch withdraw ==
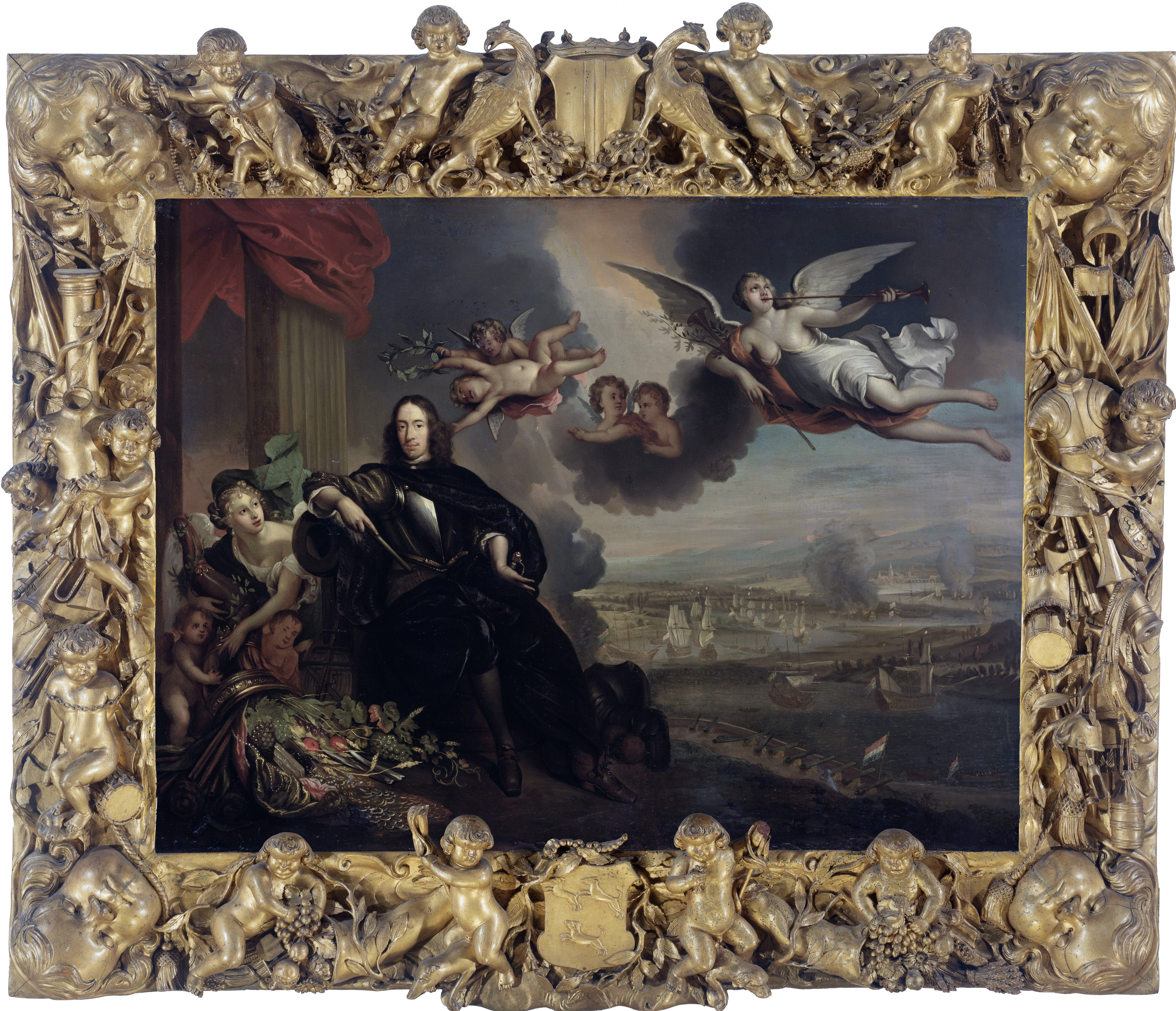
A copy of the Sea Triumph depicting Cornelis de Witt

As he expected a stiffening English resistance, Cornelis de Witt on 14 June decided to forgo a further penetration and withdraw, towing Royal Charles along as a war trophy; Unity also was removed with a prize crew. This decision saved the scuttled capital ships Royal Katherine, Unicorn, Victory and St George. However, Dutch sailors rowed to any English ship they could reach to set her on fire, thus ensuring their reward money. One boat even re-entered the docks to make sure nothing was left above the waterline of the English vessels Royal Oak, Royal James and Loyal London; another burned the merchantman Slot van Honingen, though it had been intended to salvage this precious ship. By chance, the shore facilities of Chatham Dockyard escaped destruction as no Dutch vessels reached her docks; the survival of these docks ensured the Royal Navy could repair her sunken ships. English villages were plundered—by their own troops.

The Dutch fleet, after celebrating by collectively thanking God for "a great victory in a just war in self-defence" tried to repeat its success by attacking several other ports on the English east coast but was repelled each time. On 27 June an attempt to enter the Thames beyond Gravesend was called off when it became known that the river was blocked by blockships and five fireships awaited the Dutch attack. On 2 July a Dutch marine force landed near Woodbridge north of Harwich and successfully prevented Landguard Fort from being reinforced but a direct assault on the fort by 1500 marines was beaten off by the garrison. On 3 July an attack on Osley Bay failed. On 21 July Julian calendar peace was signed.

But still, Samuel Pepys notes in his diary on 19 July 1667:

"The Dutch fleete are in great squadrons everywhere still about Harwich, and were lately at Portsmouth; and the last letters say at Plymouth, and now gone to Dartmouth to destroy our Streights' fleete lately got in thither; but God knows whether they can do it any hurt, or no, but it was pretty news come the other day so fast, of the Dutch fleets being in so many places, that Sir W. Batten at table cried, By God, says he, I think the Devil shits Dutchmen."

And on 29 July 1667: "Thus in all things, in wisdom, courage, force, knowledge of our own streams, and success, the Dutch have the best of us, and do end the war with victory on their side".

== Aftermath ==
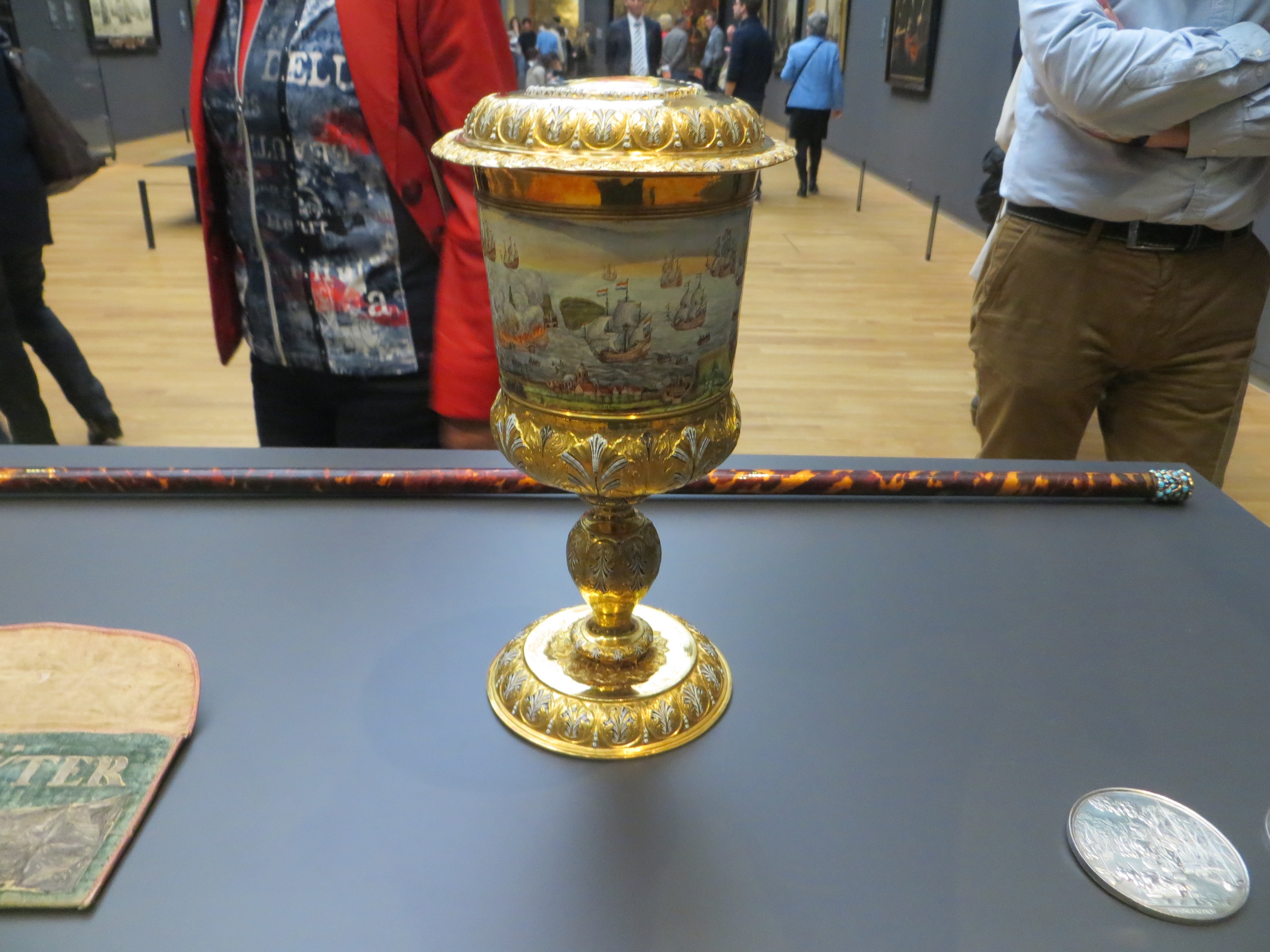
Michiel de Ruyter was rewarded with this intricate goblet for the Battle of Medway in 1667. It can be seen in the Rijksmuseum in Amsterdam.

Wharf official John Norman estimated the damage caused by the raid at about £20,000, apart from the replacement costs of the four lost capital ships; the total loss of the Royal Navy must have been close to £200,000. Pett was made a scapegoat, bailed at £5,000 and deprived of his office while those who had ignored his earlier warnings quietly escaped any blame. Royal James, Royal Oak and Loyal London were in the end salvaged and rebuilt, but at great cost and when the City of London refused to share in it, Charles had the name of the latter ship changed to a simple London. For a few years the English fleet was handicapped by its losses during the raid, but by around 1670 a new building programme had restored the English Navy to its former strength.

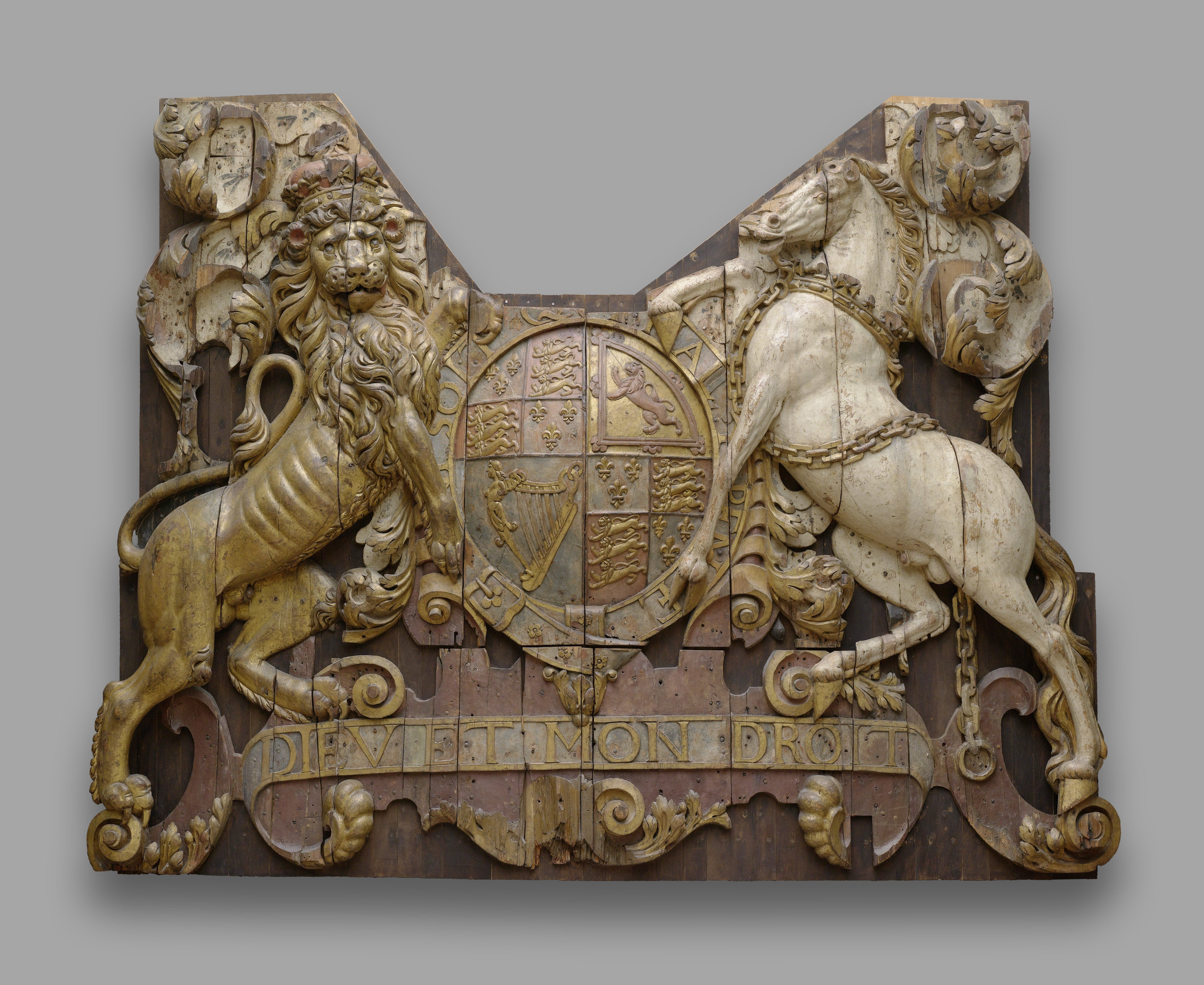
Royal Charles stern piece at the Rijksmuseum in Amsterdam

The Raid on the Medway was a serious blow to the reputation of the English crown. Charles felt personally offended by the fact the Dutch had attacked while he had laid up his fleet and peace negotiations were in progress. His resentment was one of the causes of the Third Anglo-Dutch War as it made him enter into the secret Treaty of Dover with King Louis XIV of France. In the 19th century, several British writers expanded on this theme by suggesting that it had been the Dutch who had sued for peace after their defeats in 1666—although in fact these had made them, if anything, more belligerent—and that only by treacherously attacking the English had they nevertheless been able to gain a victory; an example of this is When London burned, written by the novelist G. A. Henty in 1895. In the short term, the Lord Chancellor, Edward Hyde was made the scapegoat, impeached and forced into exile.

Total losses for the Dutch were eight spent fireships and about fifty casualties. In the Republic the populace was jubilant after the victory; many festivities were held, repeated when the fleet returned in October, the various admirals being hailed as heroes. They were rewarded by a flood of eulogies and given honorary golden chains and pensions by the States General and the lesser States of the Provinces; De Ruyter, Cornelis de Witt and Van Ghent were honoured by precious enamelled golden chalices made by Nicolaes Lockeman, depicting the events. Cornelis de Witt had a large "Sea Triumph" painted, with himself as the main subject, which was displayed in the townhall of Dordt. This triumphalism by De Witt's States faction caused resentment with the rivalling Orangist faction; when the States regime lost its power during the rampjaar of 1672, Cornelis's head was to be ceremoniously carved out from the painting, after Charles had for some years insisted the picture would be removed.

Royal Charles, her draft too deep to be of use in the shallow Dutch waters, was permanently drydocked near Hellevoetsluis as a tourist attraction, with day trips being organised for large parties, often of foreign state guests. After vehement protests by Charles that this insulted his honour, the official visits were ended and Royal Charles was eventually scrapped in 1672; however, part of her transom, bearing the coat of arms with the Lion and Unicorn and the Royal inscription Dieu et mon droit, was preserved because Charles earlier had demanded its removal and it has since 1883 been put on display in the cellar of the Rijksmuseum in Amsterdam.

On 14 March 2012 the transom was transported to England on board the Royal Netherlands Navy patrol ship Holland, accompanied by the then Dutch crown prince Willem-Alexander, where it was put on display, in commodate, at the National Maritime Museum in Greenwich as part of the Royal River: Power, Pageantry and the Thames exhibition held on the occasion of the Diamond Jubilee of Elizabeth II.

== Gallery ==
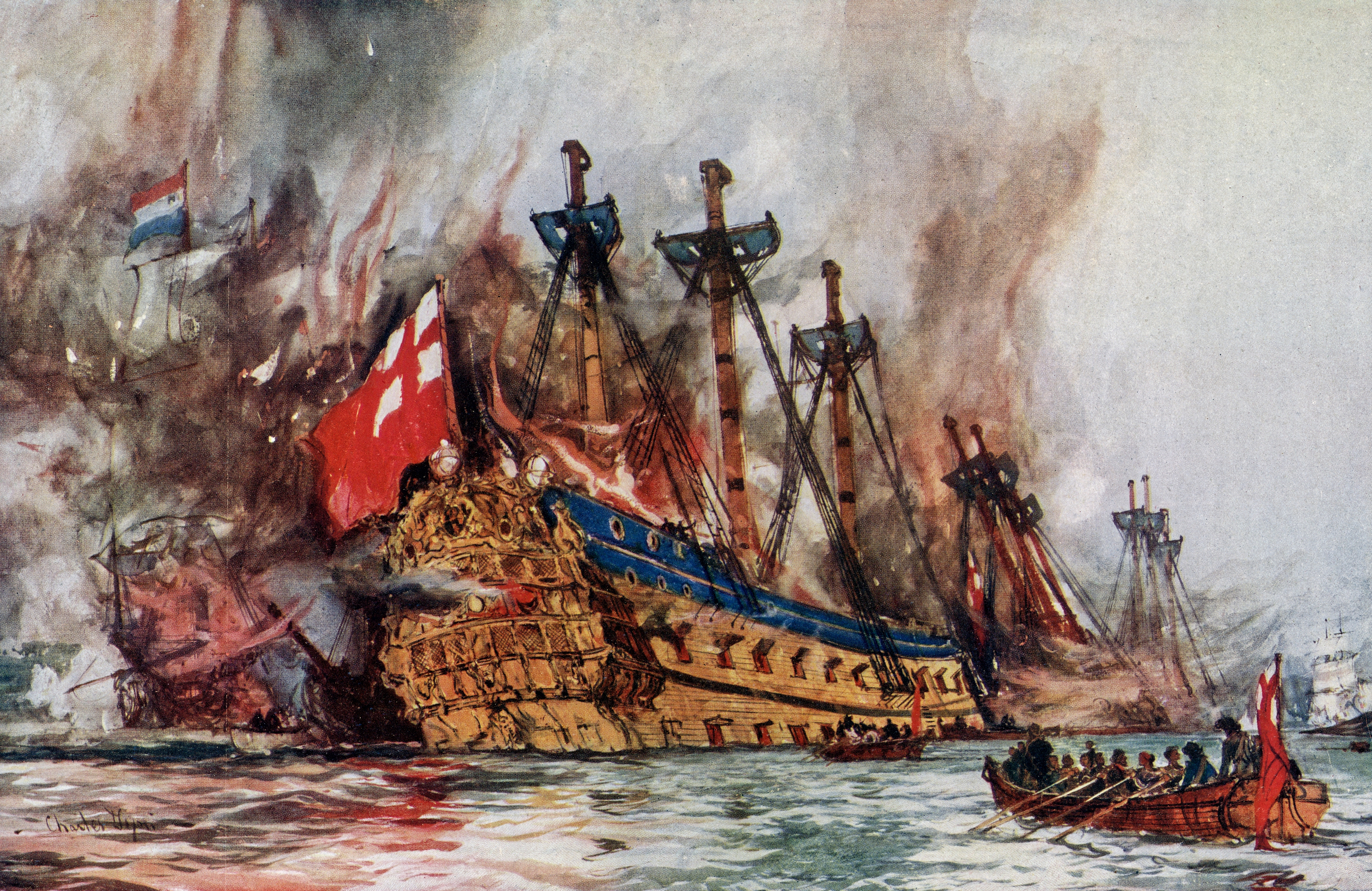
Charles Edward Dixon

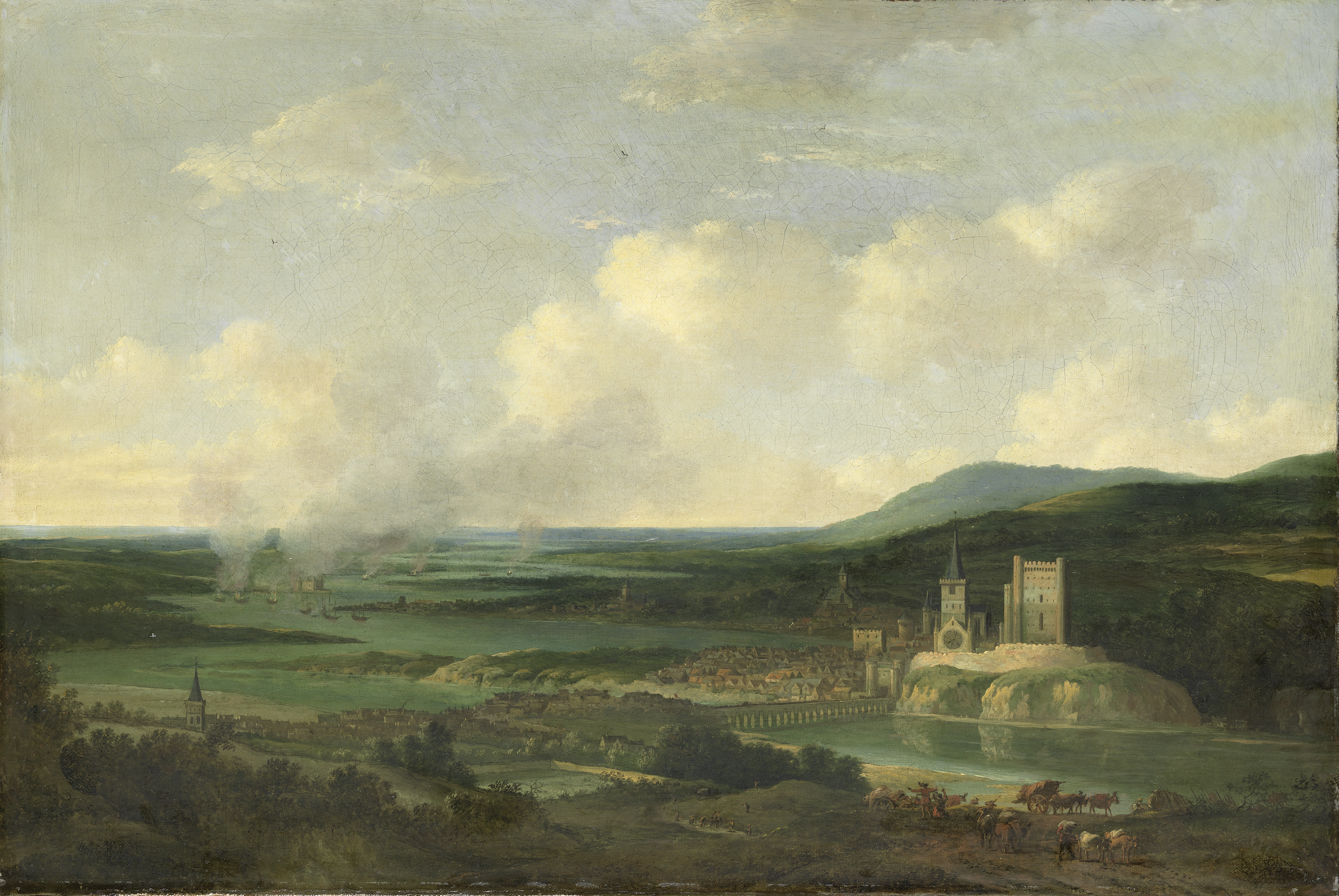
Willem Schellinks

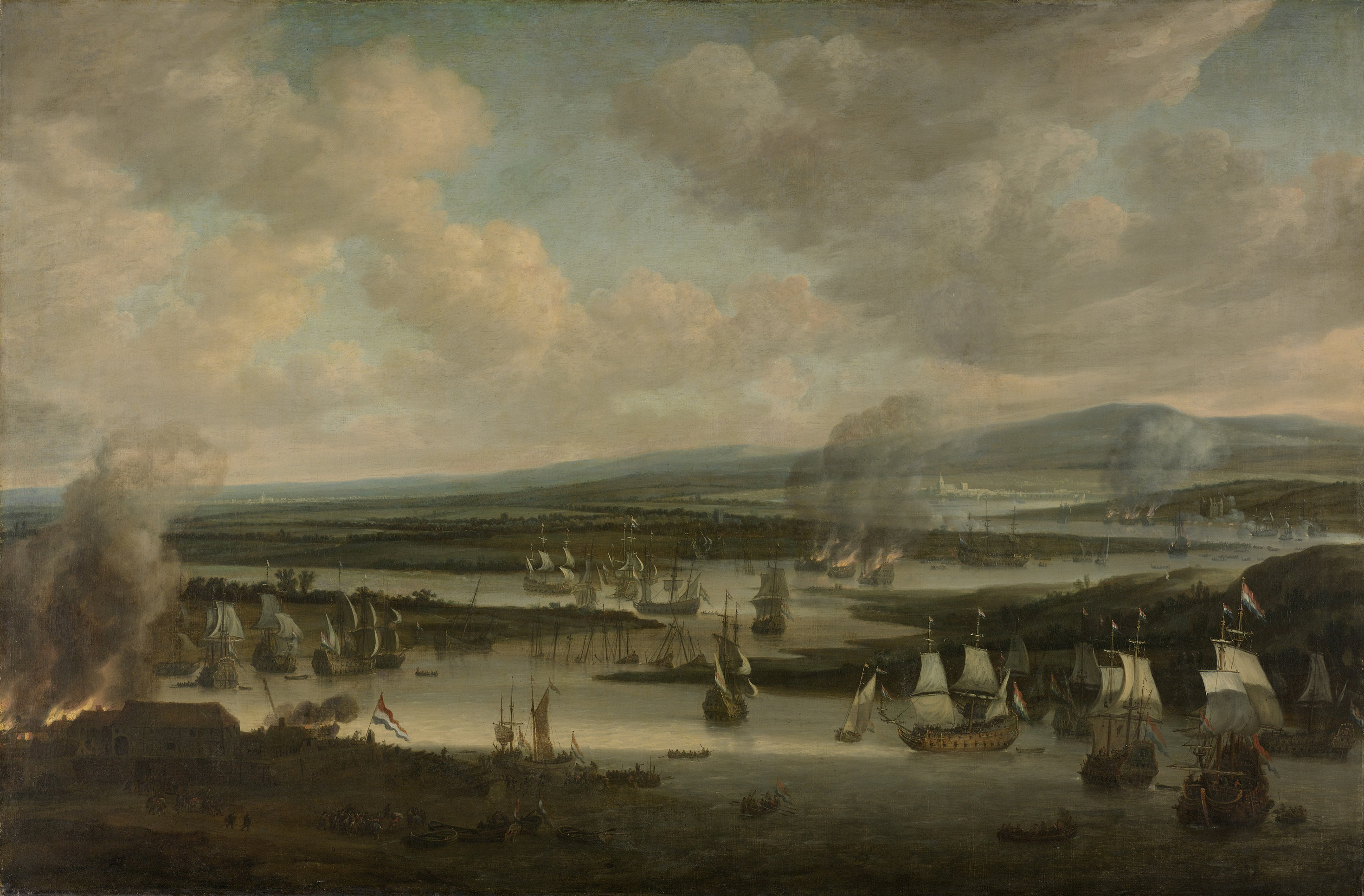
Willem Schellinks

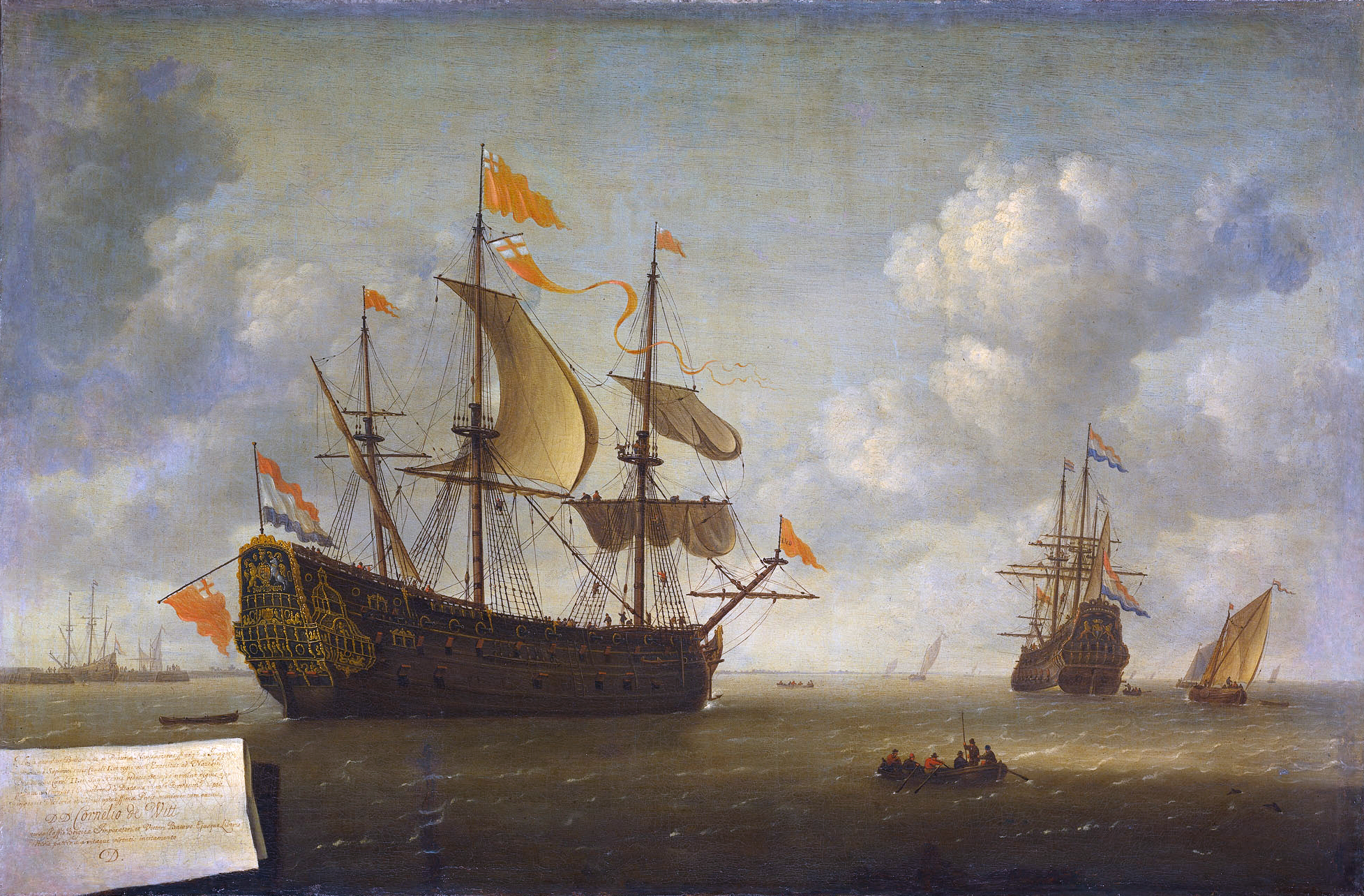
Jeronymus van Diest II

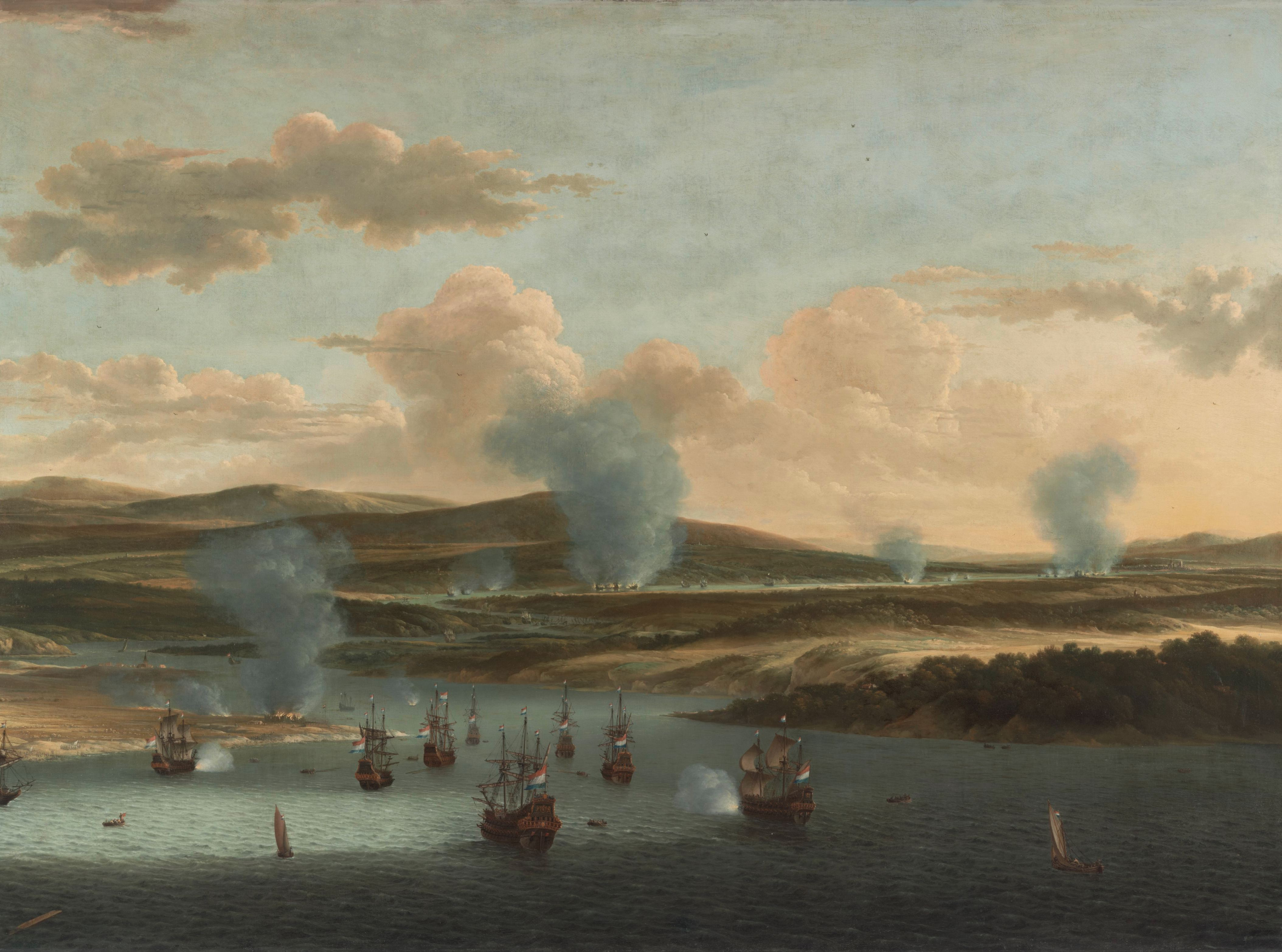
Willem Schellinks

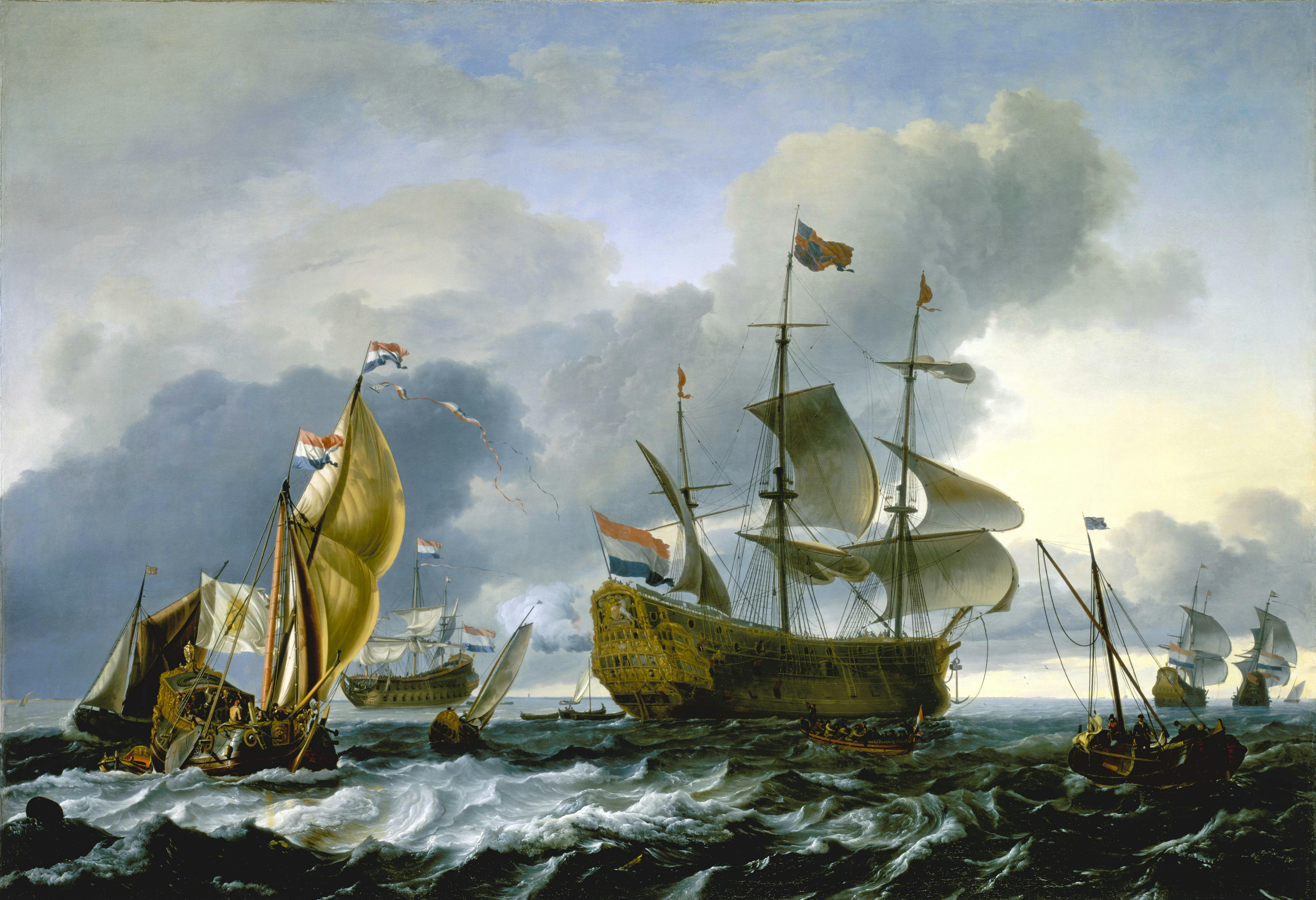
Ludolf Bakhuizen

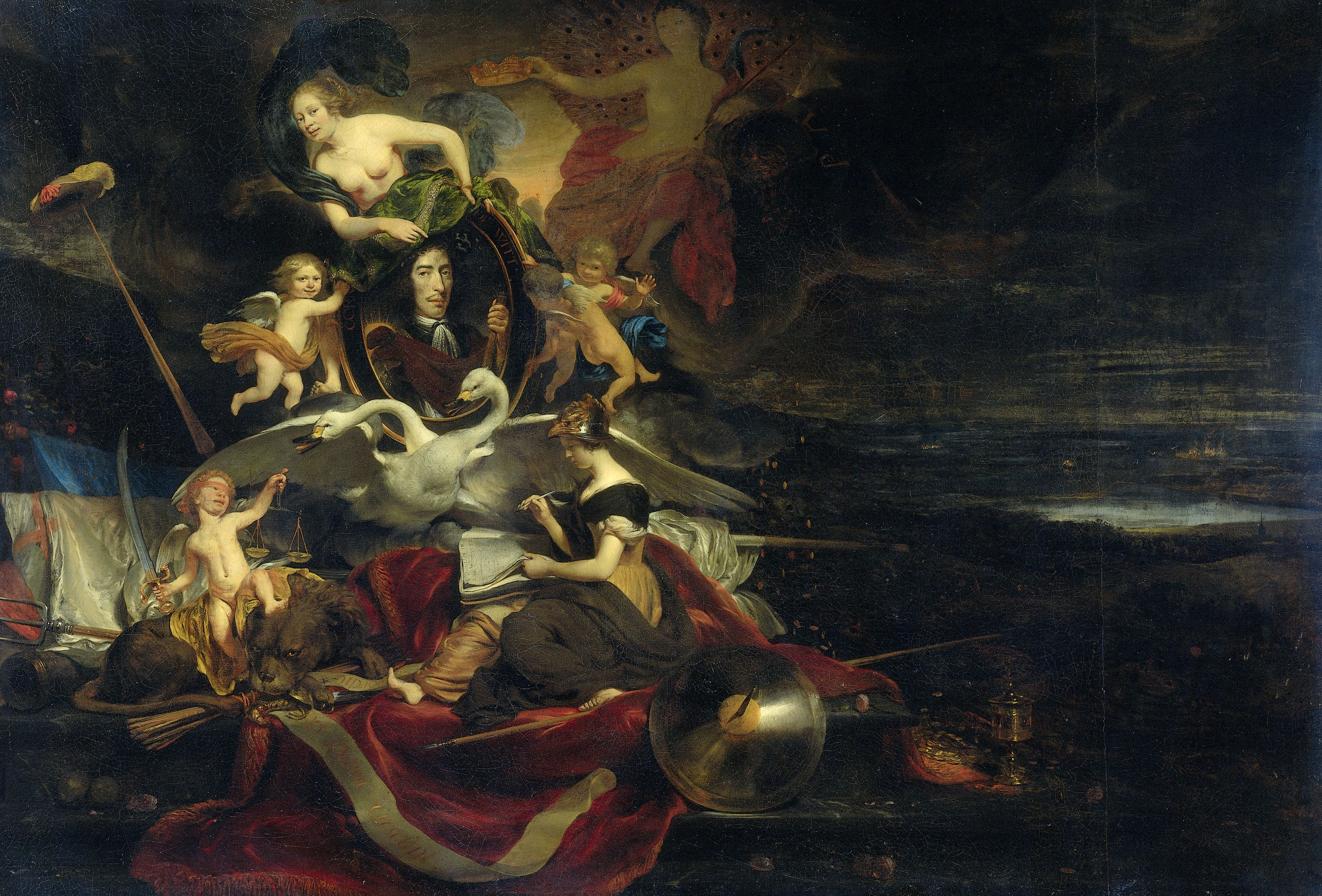
Cornelis Bisschop

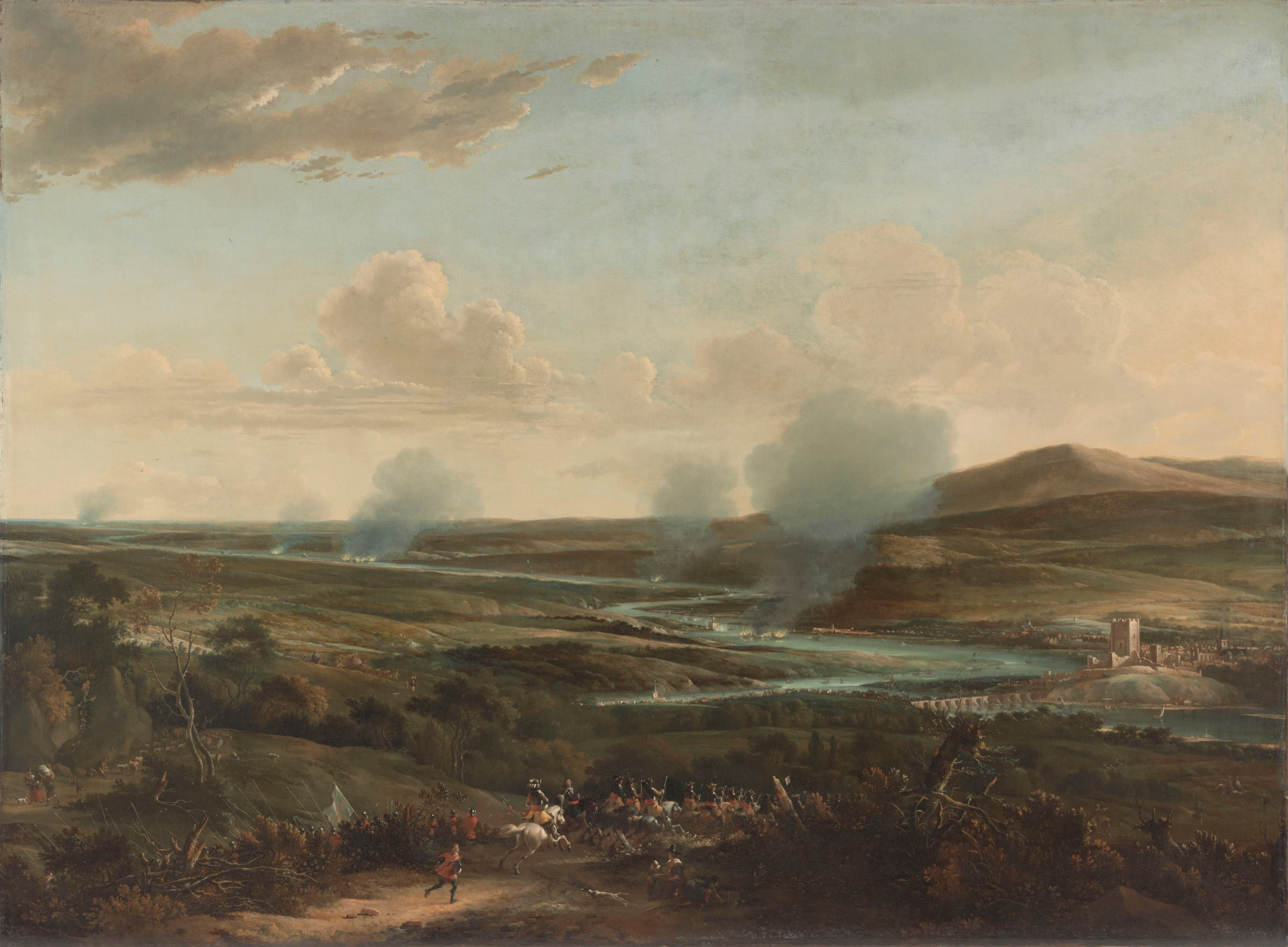
Willem Schellinks

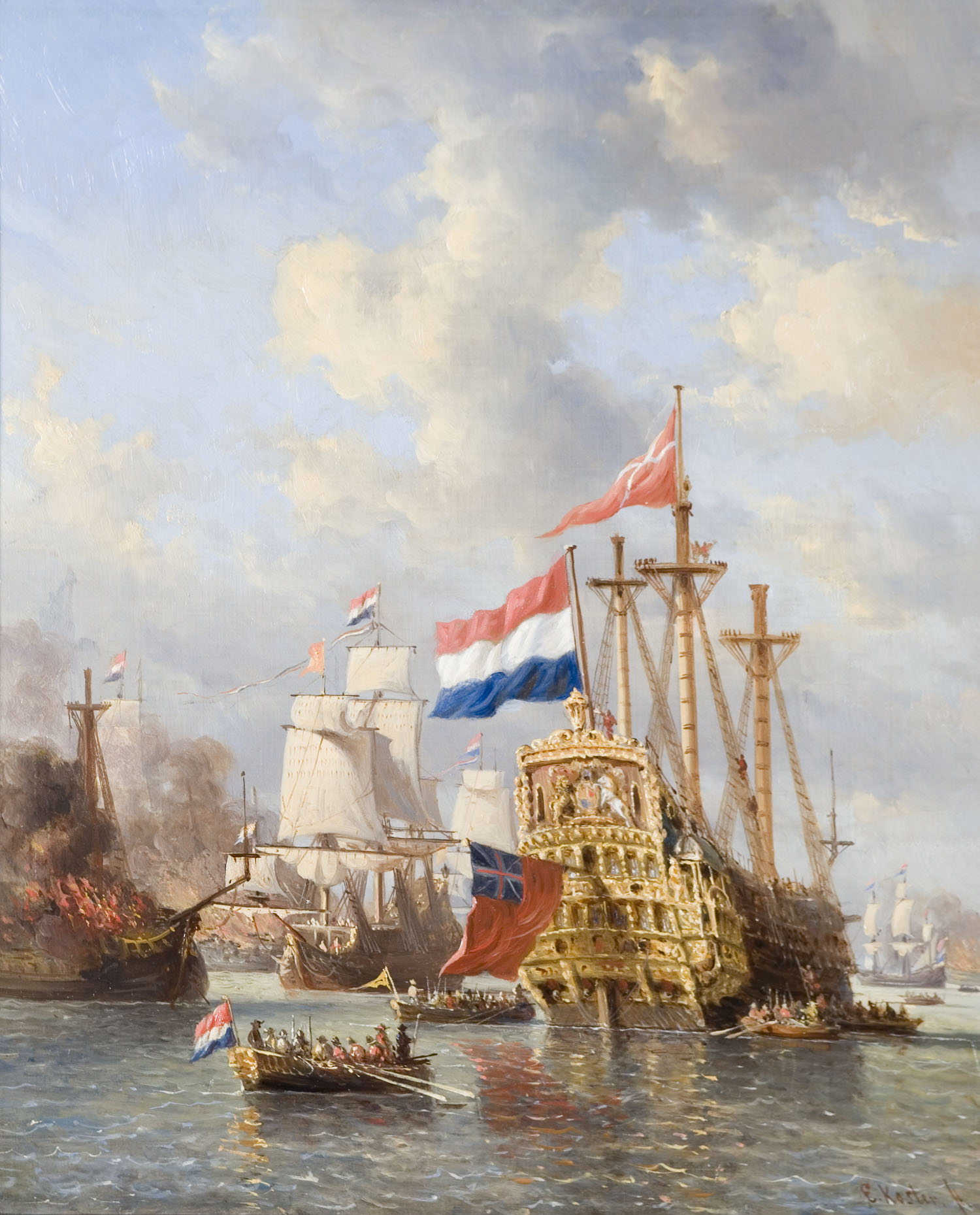
Everhardus Koster

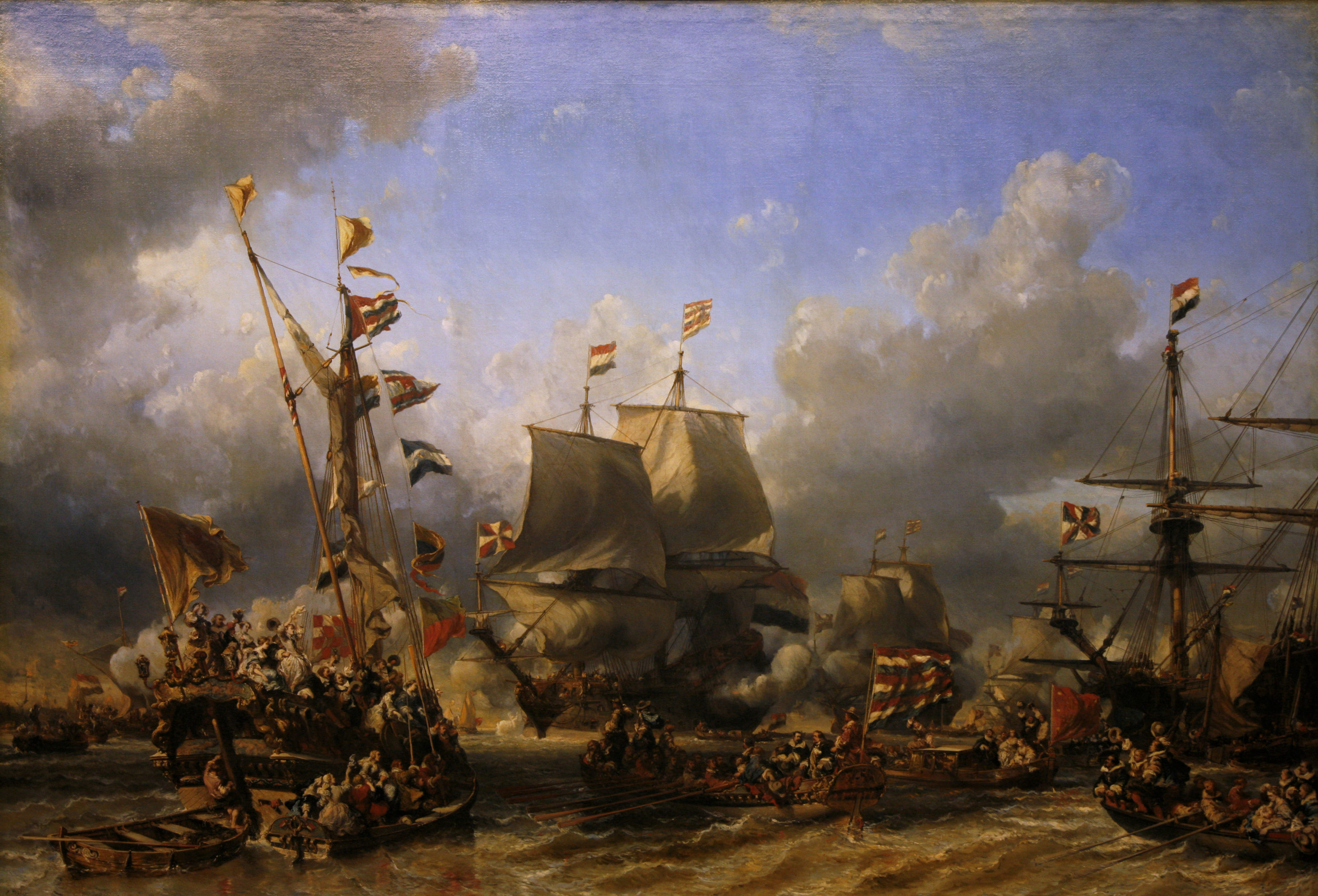
Eugène Isabey

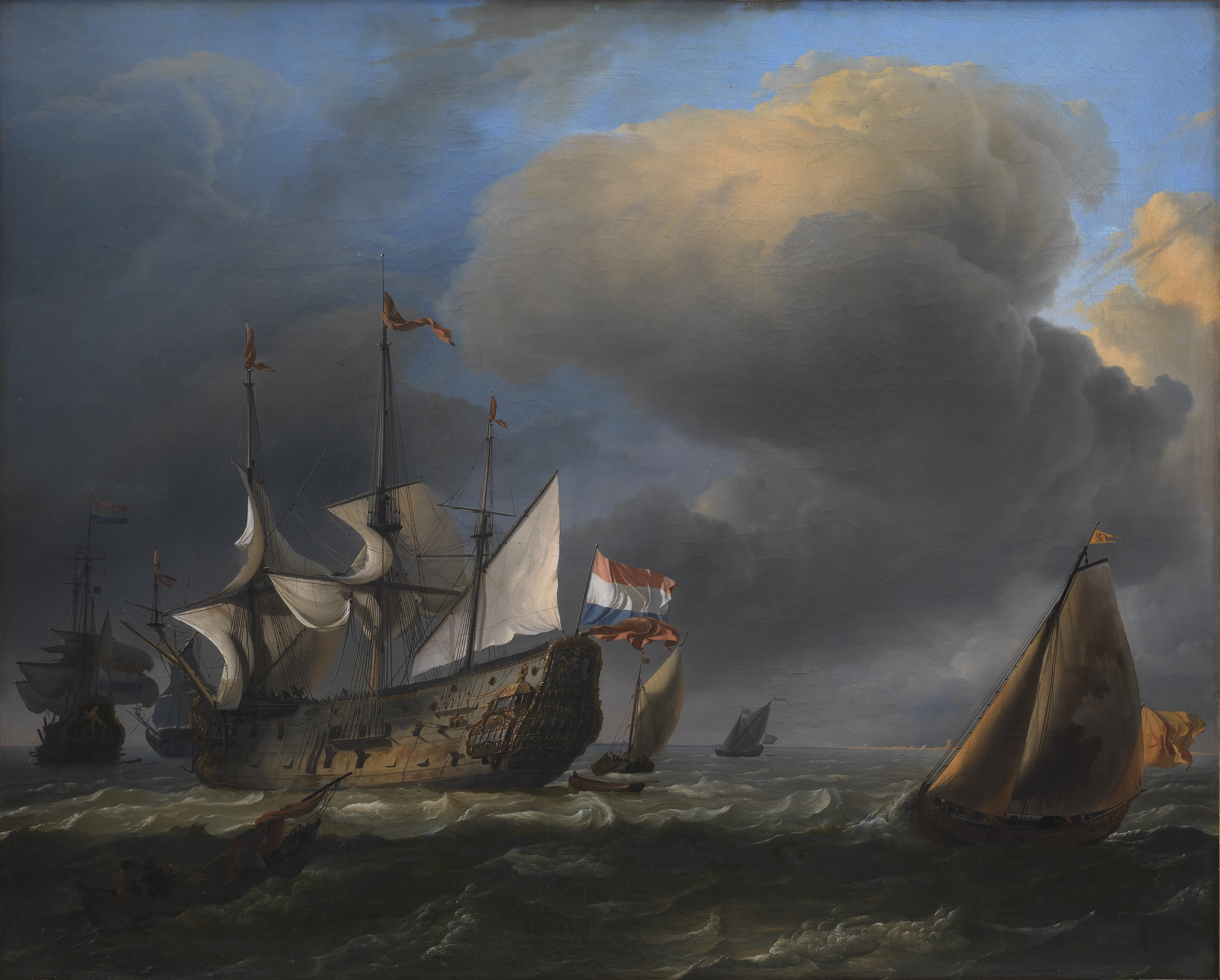
Ludolf Bakhuizen

== Commemoration ==
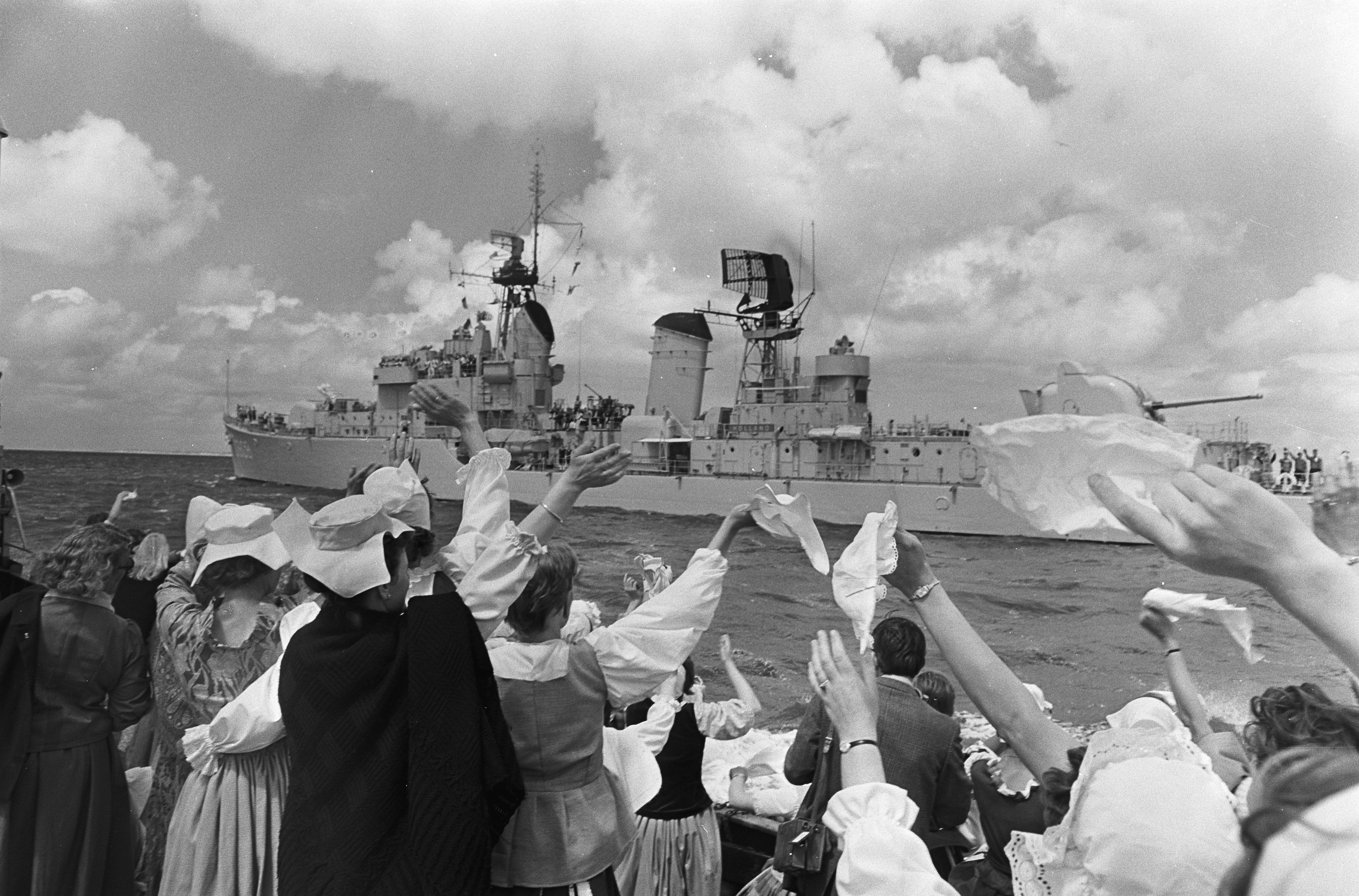
Holland leaving Den Helder in 1967, en route to Chatham

In June 1967, the Dutch destroyer Holland made a courtesy visit to Chatham, with costumed Marine re-enactors on board, to commemorate the tercentenary of the Raid.

== Literature ==
- Charles Ralph Boxer: The Anglo-Dutch Wars of the 17th Century, Her Majesty's Stationery Office, London 1974.
- Coox, Alvin D. (1949). "The Dutch Invasion of England: 1667". Military Affairs. 13 (4): 223–233. doi:10.2307/1982741. JSTOR 1982741.
- Frank L. Fox: A distant Storm – The Four Days' Battle of 1666, the greatest sea fight of the age of sail, Press of Sail Publications, Rotherfield/ East Sussex 1996, ISBN 0-948864-29-X.
- Helmut Diwald: Der Kampf um die Weltmeere, München/ Zürich 1980, ISBN 3-426-26030-1.
- Roger Hainsworth / Christine Churchers: The Anglo-Dutch Naval Wars 1652–1674, Sutton Publishing Limited, Thrupp/ Stroud/ Gloucestershire 1998, ISBN 0-7509-1787-3.
- James R. Jones: The Anglo-Dutch Wars of the Seventeenth Century, Longman House, London/ New York 1996, ISBN 0-582-05631-4.
- Brian Lavery: The Ship of the Line, Bd.1, Conway Maritime Press, 1983, ISBN 0-85177-252-8.
- Charles Macfarlane: The Dutch on the Medway, James Clarke & Co., 1897.
- Alfred Thayer Mahan: Der Einfluß der Seemacht auf die Geschichte 1660–1812, Herford 1967.
- Alexander Meurer: Seekriegsgeschichte in Umrissen, Leipzig 1942.
- N. A. M. Rodger: The Command of the Ocean: A Naval History of Britain 1649–1815, New York, 2004 ISBN 0-393-32847-3
- P. G. Rogers: The Dutch on the Medway Oxford University Press, Oxford 1970, ISBN 0-19-215185-1.
- Age Scheffer: Roemruchte jaren van onze vloot, Baarn 1966
