= Clere baronets =

Extinct baronetcy in the Baronetage of England

Clere baronets of Ormesby
- Escutcheon of the Clere baronets of Ormesby
- Creation date: 1620
- Status: extinct
- Extinction date: 1622

The Clere Baronetcy, of Ormesby in the County of Norfolk, was a title in the Baronetage of England. It was created on 26 February 1621 for Sir Henry Clere. His only son by his wife Muriel Moundeford, half-sister of Sir Edmund Moundeford of Feltwell, died in infancy and the title became extinct on his early death in 1622. He had one daughter Abigail, who married John Williams, otherwise Cromwell, second son of Sir Oliver Cromwell, and first cousin of the Lord Protector Oliver Cromwell, by whom she had two children Having separated from her husband she became an actress, and the mistress of William Brouncker, 2nd Viscount Brouncker. As such she is known to readers of the Diary of Samuel Pepys as "Madam Williams". Pepys strongly disapproved of the affair, but it endured until Lord Brouncker's death in 1684, and he left Abigail much of his property.

The Cleres were an ancient Norfolk family. Sir Robert Clere was famous for his great wealth and served as High Sheriff of Norfolk in 1501. His son Sir John Clere was Treasurer of the King's Army in France in 1549. Sir John's son Edward Clere represented both Thetford and Grampound in Parliament. Edward's son Sir Edward Clere was High Sheriff of Norfolk in 1586 but was forced to sell the family estate of Blickling Hall. Sir Edward's son was the first Baronet.

Sir Thomas Clere was the third son of Sir Robert Clere.

== Clere baronets, of Ormesby (1621) ==
- Sir Henry Clere, 1st Baronet (c. 1599–1622)
