= HMS Unity (1665) =

Ship of the line of the Royal Navy

History

England
- Name: Unity
- Acquired: Captured from the Dutch 1665
- Fate: Recaptured by the Dutch 11 June 1667

General characteristics as built
- Class & type: 42-gun fourth-rate ship of the line
- Length: 95 ft (29 m) (keel)
- Beam: 34 ft 6 in (10.52 m)
- Depth of hold: 9 ft 2 in (2.79 m)
- Sail plan: Full-rigged ship
- Complement: 150 (wartime)
- Armament: 42 guns of various weights of shot

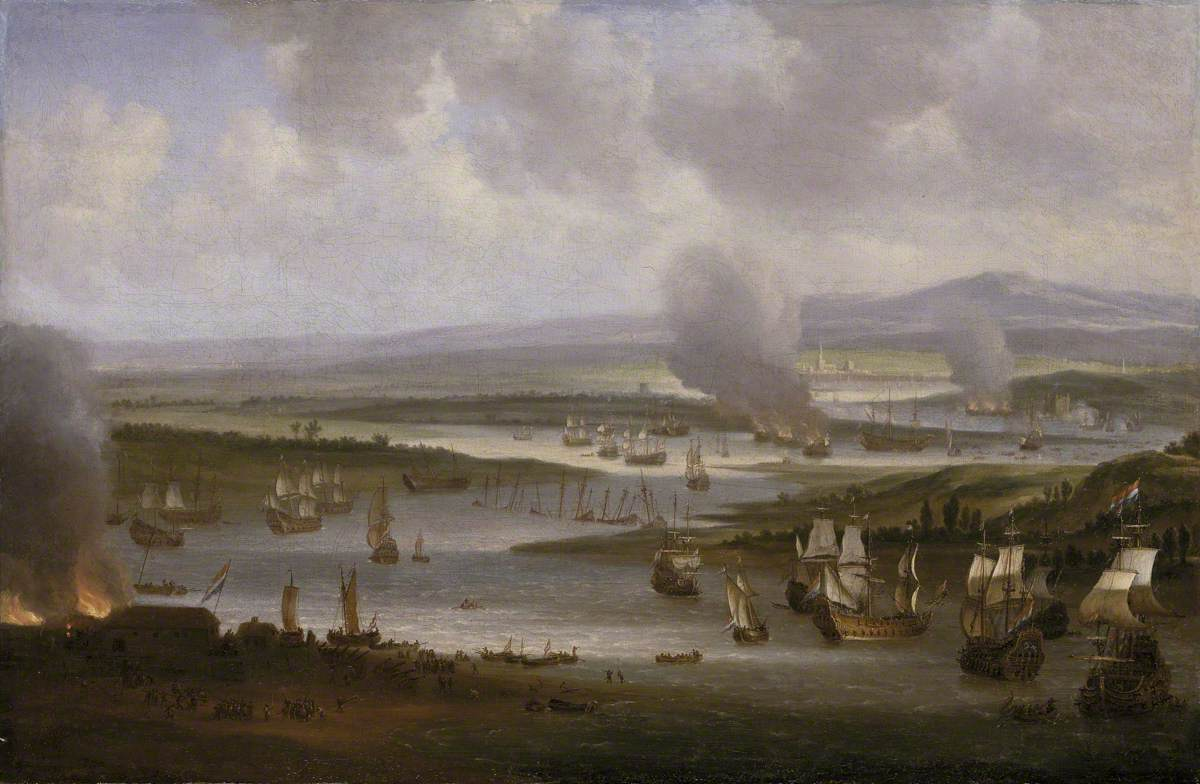
Unity recaptured by the Breda here, in this picture 'Dutch Ships in the Medway', June 1667 by, Willem Schellinks

HMS Unity was a 42-gun fourth-rate ship of the line of the English Royal Navy, formerly the Dutch warship Eendracht, captured from the Dutch on 22 February 1665 by the English warships Yarmouth, Diamond and Mermaid. She was commissioned on 1665 under Captain Thomas Trafford. In 1667 she became a guard ship at Sheerness, but was recaptured by the Dutch warship Vrede during the Raid on the Medway in June 1667.
