= William Brouncker, 2nd Viscount Brouncker =

Anglo-Irish peer and mathematician (1620–1684)

The Right Honourable The Viscount Brouncker FRS
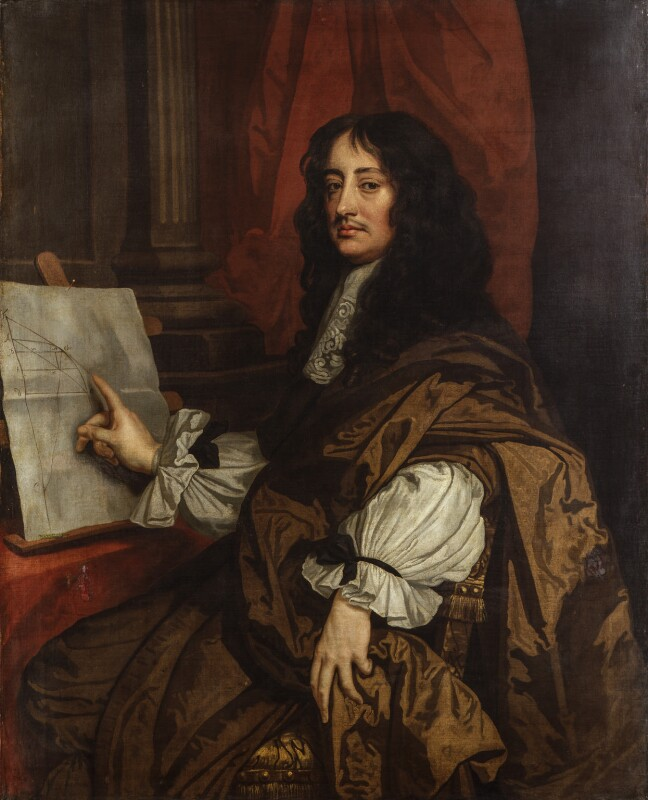

President of the Royal Society
- In office 1662–1677
- Preceded by: Office established
- Succeeded by: Joseph Williamson

Personal details
- Born: c. 1620 Castlelyons, Ireland
- Died: 5 April 1684 (aged 64) Westminster, London
- Scientific career
- Education: University of Oxford
- Known for: Brouncker's formula, leadership of Royal Society
- Fields: Mathematician, civil servant
- Workplaces: Saint Catherine's Hospital
- Academic advisors: John Wallis

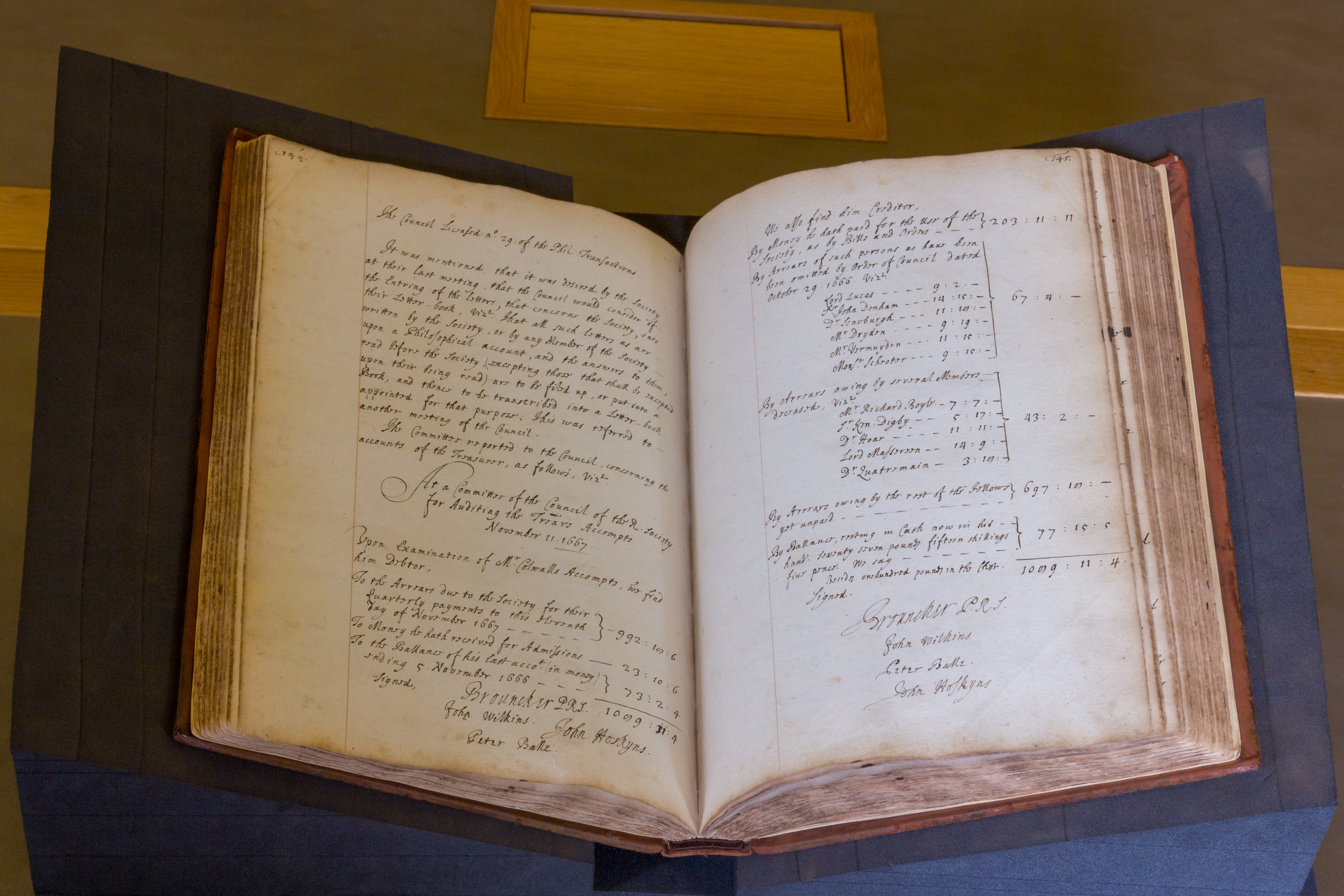
Brouncker's signature as president, signing off the 1667 accounts of the Royal Society, from the minutes book

William Brouncker, 2nd Viscount Brouncker, FRS (c. 1620 – 5 April 1684) was an Anglo-Irish peer and mathematician who served as the president of the Royal Society from 1662 to 1677. Best known for introducing Brouncker's formula, he also worked as a civil servant, serving as a commissioner in the Royal Navy. Brouncker was a friend and colleague of Samuel Pepys, and features prominently in the Pepys' diary.

== Biography ==
Brouncker was born c. 1620 in Castlelyons, County Cork, the elder son of William Brouncker (1585–1649), 1st Viscount Brouncker and Winifred, daughter of Sir William Leigh of Newnham. His family came originally from Melksham in Wiltshire. His grandfather Sir Henry Brouncker (died 1607) had been Lord President of Munster 1603–1607, and settled his family in Ireland. His father was created a viscount in the Peerage of Ireland in 1645 for his services to the Crown. Although the first viscount had fought for the Crown in the Anglo-Scots war of 1639, malicious gossip said that he paid the then enormous sum of £1,200 for the title and was almost ruined as a result. He died only a few months afterwards.

William obtained a DM at the University of Oxford in 1647. Until 1660 he played no part in public life: being a staunch Royalist, he felt it best to live quietly and devote himself to his mathematical studies. He was one of the founders and the first president of the Royal Society. In 1662, he became chancellor to Queen Catherine, then head of the Saint Catherine's Hospital. He was appointed one of the commissioners of the Royal Navy in 1664, and his career thereafter can be traced in the Diary of Samuel Pepys; despite their frequent disagreements, Samuel Pepys on the whole respected Brouncker more than most of his other colleagues, writing on 25 August 1668 that "the truth is, he is the best man of them all".

Although his attendance at the Royal Society had become infrequent, and he had quarrelled with some of his fellow members, he was nonetheless greatly displeased to be deprived of the presidency in 1677. He was commissioner for executing the office of Lord High Admiral of England from 1679.

=== Abigail Williams ===
Brouncker never married, but lived for many years with the actress Abigail Williams (much to Samuel Pepys' disgust) and left most of his property to her. She was the daughter of Sir Henry Clere (died 1622), first and last of the Clere Baronets, and the estranged wife of John Williams, otherwise Cromwell, second son of Sir Oliver Cromwell, and first cousin to the renowned Oliver Cromwell. She and John had a son and a daughter. The fire of 1673 which destroyed the Royal Navy Office started in her private closet: this is unlikely to have improved her relations with Pepys, whose private apartments were also destroyed in the blaze.

On Brouncker's death in 1684, his title passed to his brother Henry, one of the most detested men of the era. William left him almost nothing in his will "for reasons I think not fit to mention".

== Mathematical works ==
His mathematical work concerned in particular the calculations of the lengths of the parabola and cycloid, and the quadrature of the hyperbola, which requires approximation of the natural logarithm function by infinite series. He was the first European to solve what is now known as Pell's equation. He was the first in England to take interest in generalized continued fractions and, following the work of John Wallis, he provided development in the generalized continued fraction of pi.

=== Brouncker's formula ===
This formula provides a development of π/4 in a generalized continued fraction:

$$\frac \pi 4 = \cfrac{1}{1+\cfrac{1^2}{2+\cfrac{3^2}{2+\cfrac{5^2}{2+\cfrac{7^2}{2+\cfrac{9^2}{2+\ddots}}}}}}$$

The convergents are related to the Leibniz formula for pi: for instance

$$\frac{1}{1+\frac{1^2}{2}} = \frac{2}{3} = 1 - \frac{1}{3}$$

and

$$\frac{1}{1+\frac{1^2}{2+\frac{3^2}{2}}} = \frac{13}{15} = 1 - \frac{1}{3} + \frac{1}{5}.$$

Because of its slow convergence, Brouncker's formula is not useful for practical computations of π.

Brouncker's formula can also be expressed as

$$\frac 4 \pi = 1+\cfrac{1^2}{2+\cfrac{3^2}{2+\cfrac{5^2}{2+\cfrac{7^2}{2+\cfrac{9^2}{2+\ddots}}}}}$$

See Euler's continued fraction formula.

== See also ==
- List of presidents of the Royal Society

Peerage of Ireland
Preceded by William Brouncker	Viscount Brouncker; 1645–1684	Succeeded by Henry Brouncker
Professional and academic associations
First	1st President of the Royal Society; 1662–1677	Succeeded by Joseph Williamson
