= David Vlugh =

Dutch States Navy officer

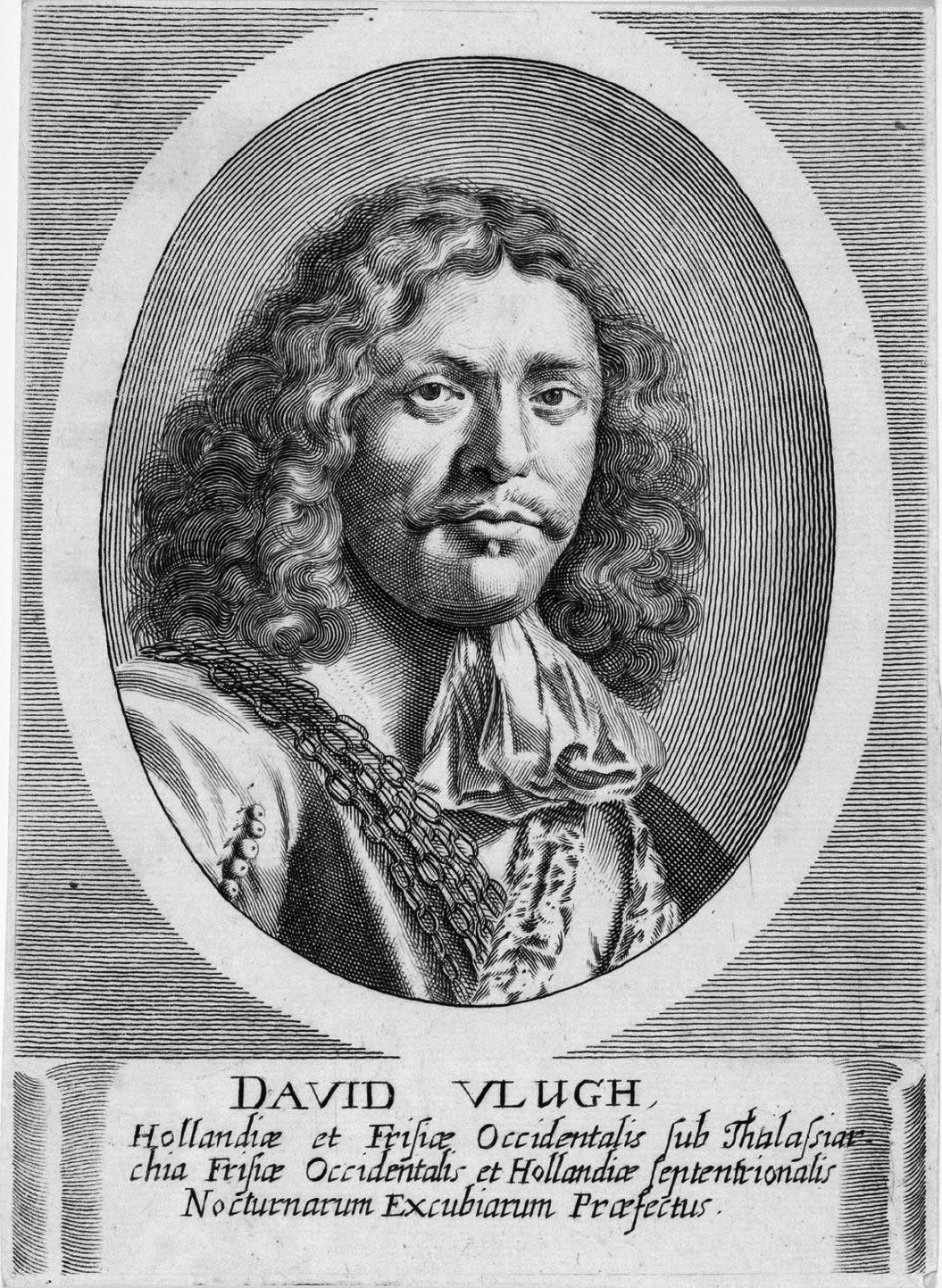
- Born: c. 1611; Enkhuizen, North Holland, Dutch Republic
- Died: June 7, 1673 (aged 61 or 62); Died during The First Battle of Schooneveld

David Vlugh (c. 1611 – June 7, 1673) was a Dutch States Navy rear admiral. He took part in the 1667 Raid on the Medway during the Second Anglo-Dutch War. He was killed by the British in the June 7, 1673 Battle of Schooneveld during the Franco-Dutch War.
