= Viscount Brouncker =

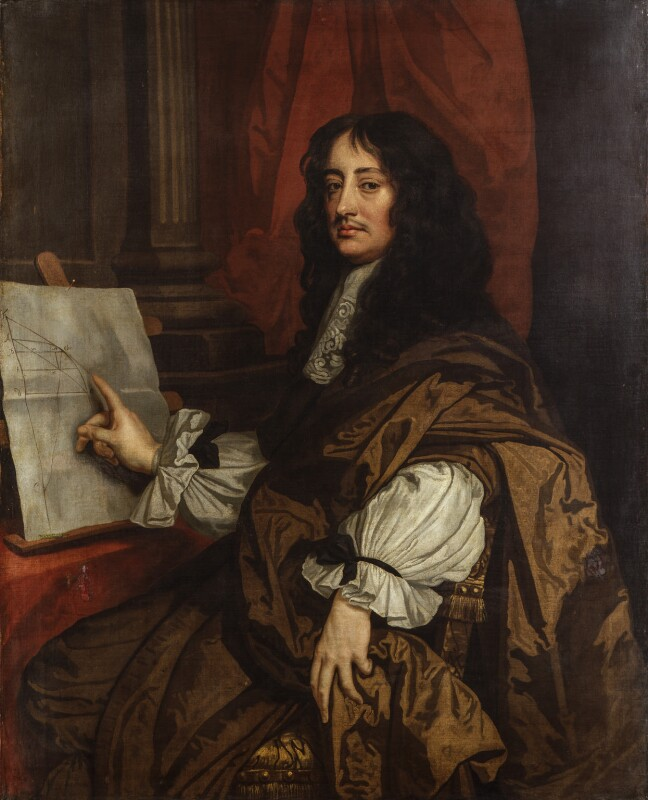
A portrait of William Brouncker, 2nd Viscount Brouncker.

Viscount Brouncker, of Lyons in the Province of Leinster, was a title in the Peerage of Ireland. It was created on 12 September 1645 for the courtier Sir William Brouncker. He was made Baron Brouncker, of Newcastle in the Province of Munster, at the same time, also in the Peerage of Ireland. He was succeeded by his eldest son William, the second Viscount. William was a distinguished mathematician, who was the first President of the Royal Society and also held political office. He was unmarried and was succeeded by his younger brother Henry, the third Viscount. Henry served as Cofferer of the Household between 1680 and 1685, but was universally detested as being "false, hard and covetous". He was childless and the titles became extinct on his death in 1688.

Sir Henry Brouncker, father of the first Viscount, was Lord President of Munster 1603–1607.

== Viscounts Brouncker (1645) ==
- William Brouncker, 1st Viscount Brouncker (1585–1645)
- William Brouncker, 2nd Viscount Brouncker (1620–1684)
- Henry Brouncker, 3rd Viscount Brouncker (1626–1688)
