= Henry Brouncker (courtier, died 1607) =

Member of the Parliament of England

Sir Henry Brouncker (c. 1550 – 3 June 1607) of Erlestoke, Wiltshire and West Ham, Essex was an English politician whose later career was spent in Ireland.

He was born in Wiltshire, a younger son of Henry Brouncker of Melksham and Erlestoke and his second wife Ursula Yate. He was the younger brother of William Brouncker.

The standing of his family among the local gentry secured him a seat as Member (MP) of the Parliament of England for Westbury, Wiltshire in 1572 alongside his elder brother and for Devizes in 1584, 1586 and 1589.

During the 1590s he saw military service in Ireland, where he was knighted in 1597 by Thomas Burgh, 3rd Baron Burgh, the Lord Deputy of Ireland. In 1600 he was sent as an ambassador to James VI to congratulate the king on his escape from the Gowrie Conspiracy. He was well received in Scotland, being described as "true, wise and not disliked".

In 1601 he re-entered parliament, sitting for Dorchester possibly through the patronage of Sir Robert Cecil, with whom he had been in regular contact while in Scotland. Early in 1603 he was sent to Hardwick Hall to interrogate Lady Arbella Stuart about her marriage plans.

After the accession of King James I, he was in favour at Court, being listed as one of those who had the right of unrestricted access to the Privy Chamber. In 1604 he succeeded Sir George Carew as Lord President of Munster. He died in that office and was buried in St. Mary's Church, Cork.

By his wife Anne (d. 1612), daughter of Henry Parker, 11th Baron Morley and Lady Elizabeth Stanley, he was the father of William, 1st Viscount Brouncker.
