= Henry Brouncker, 3rd Viscount Brouncker =

Anglo-Irish peer, courtier and politician

The Right Honourable The Viscount Brouncker
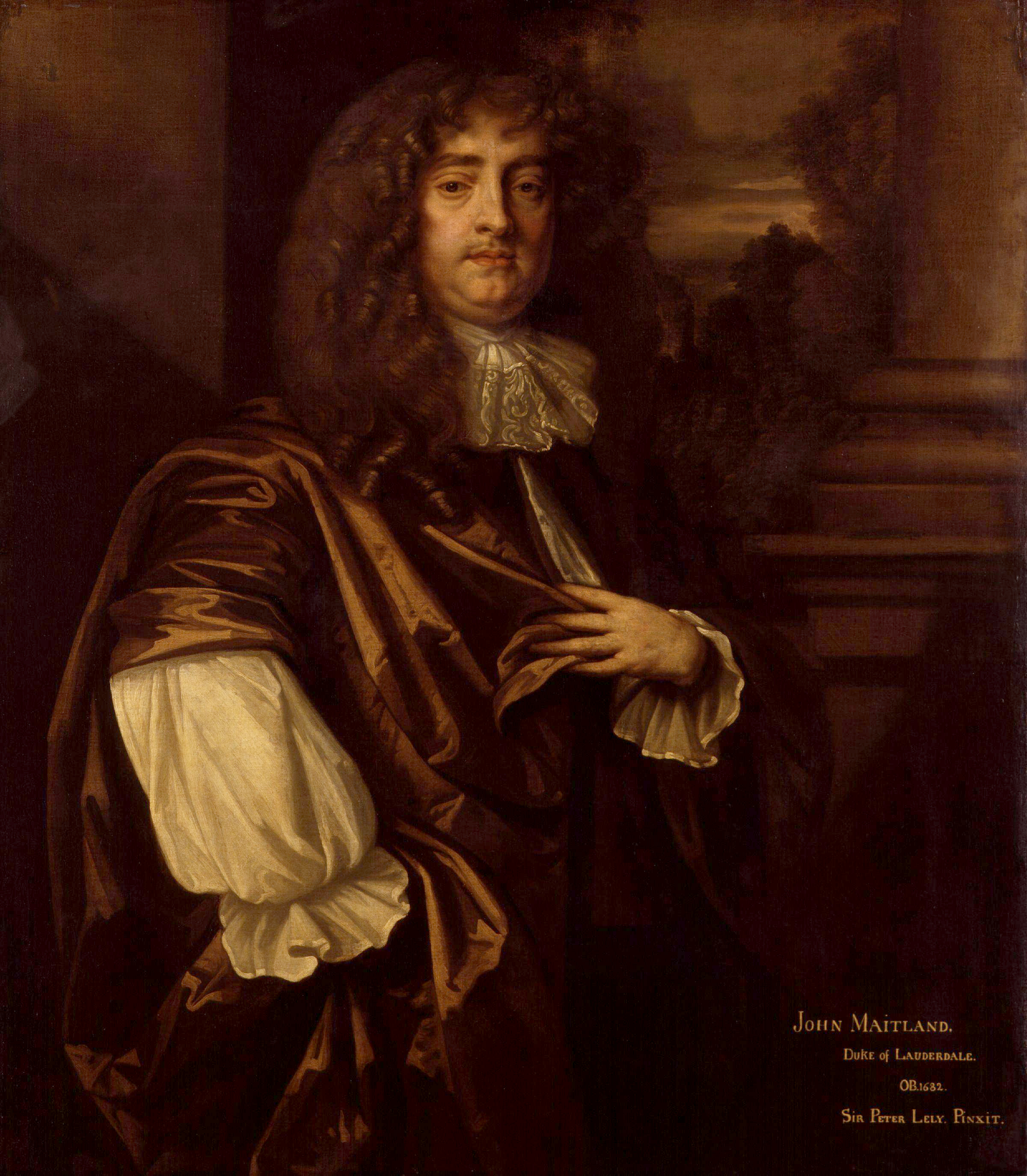

Cofferer of the Household
- In office 9 December 1679 – 6 February 1685
- Monarch: Charles II
- Preceded by: William Ashburnham
- Succeeded by: Sir Peter Apsley

Personal details
- Born: c. 1627 Likely Ireland
- Died: 4 January 1688 (aged 60–61) Surrey, England
- Resting place: Richmond, London, England
- Spouse: Rebecca Rodway
- Education: University of Oxford

Henry Brouncker, 3rd Viscount Brouncker (c. 1627 – 4 January 1688) was an Anglo-Irish peer, courtier and politician. He served as Cofferer of the Household to Charles II, and served as Gentleman of the Bedchamber to James, Duke of York. He was a member of parliament and a very skilled games player.

== Biography ==
=== Early life ===
Born in 1624, most likely in Ireland, where his grandfather had been Lord President of Munster, Brouncker was the second son of William Brouncker, 1st Viscount Brouncker and Winifred Leigh. He was the younger brother of William Brouncker, 2nd Viscount Brouncker, who was the first President of the Royal Society, and a well-known mathematician. His father was created a Viscount in the Peerage of Ireland in 1645, by King Charles I of England, for services to the Crown.

=== Oxford graduate ===
Henry graduated from Oxford University in 1646 as a Doctor of Medicine (DM).

=== MP, expelled from Commons ===
He was Member of Parliament for New Romney from 1665 to 21 April 1668. But he was expelled from the House of Commons when charges were brought against him, for allowing the Dutch fleet to escape during the Battle of Lowestoft, Second Anglo-Dutch War, and for ordering the sails of the English fleet to be slackened in the name of the Duke of York. This was essentially an act of treason. Such a military decision, taken without the Duke's authority, was an incident seemingly without parallel, especially as his apparent motive was simply that he was fatigued with the stress and noise of the battle.

=== Bad reputation ===
John Evelyn wrote, "ever noted for hard covetous vicious man, but for his worldly craft and skill in gaming few exceeded him". He was a famous chess player. He is mentioned in the famous "Memoirs" of Philibert, comte de Gramont, in particular his preference for "Orange seller" girls.

On 29 August 1667 Samuel Pepys called Brouncker: "a pestilent rogue, an atheist, that would have sold his king and country for 6d. almost".

=== Marriage ===
He married (in 1661) Rebecca Rodway, widow of Thomas Jermyn, brother to the Henry Jermyn, 1st Earl of St Albans, and they had no children.

=== Civil servant ===
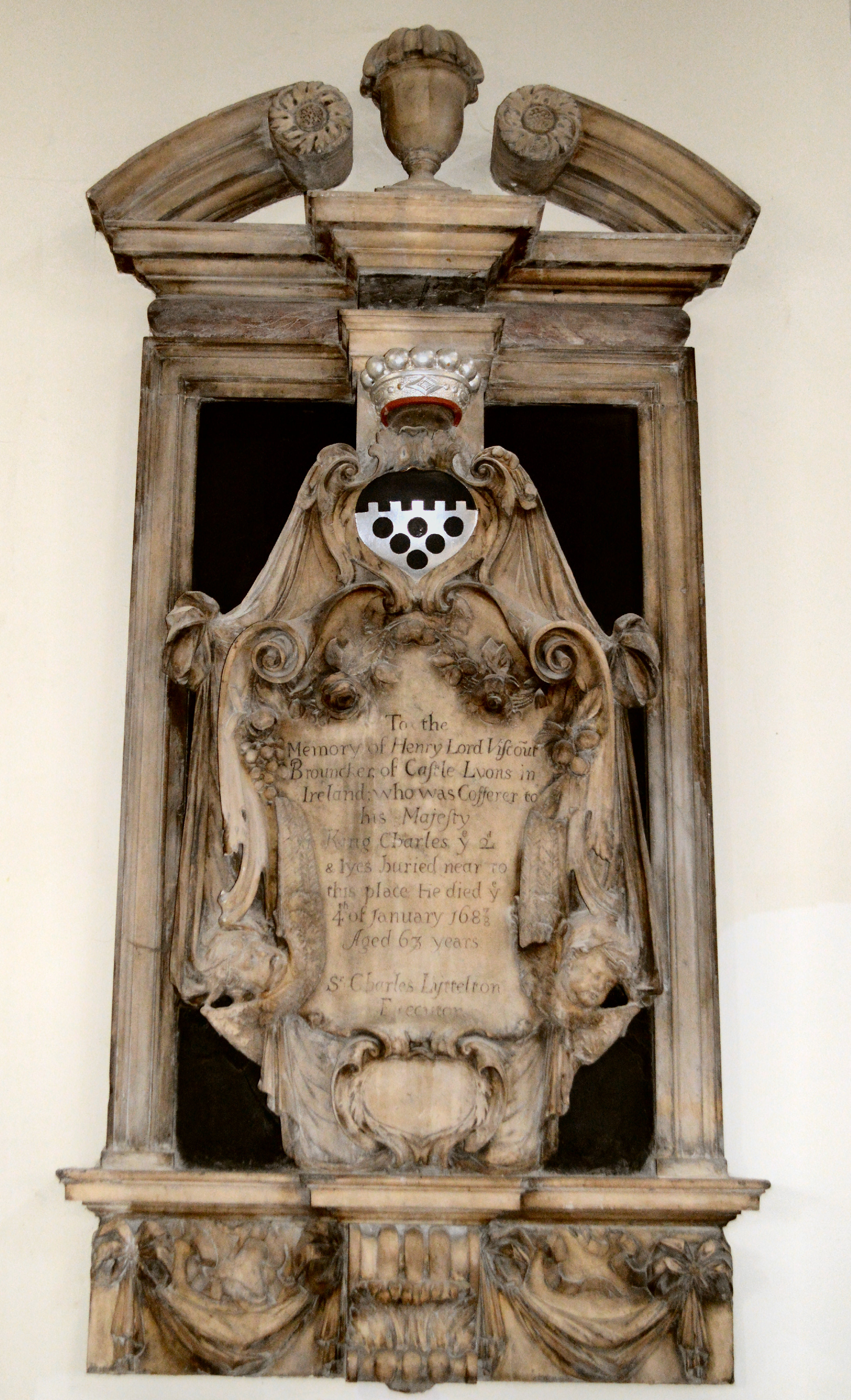
Mural monument to Henry Brouncker, 3rd Viscount Brouncker, St Mary Magdalene's, Richmond, Surrey

He was a Commissioner of Trade and Plantation in 1673. He became Cofferer of the Household to Charles II on 9 December 1679, following the death of William Ashburnham. He vacated the office on 6 February 1685, following the death of the king. He also served as Gentleman of the Bedchamber to James, Duke of York.

Henry and William, his elder brother, were on bad terms, and upon William's death in 1684, William disinherited Henry, "for reasons I think not fit to mention". He left most of his wealth to his mistress, the actress Abigail Williams-Cromwell (a cousin by marriage of Oliver Cromwell), with whom he had lived happily outside marriage for many years. At this time, Henry did inherit the title of Viscount, however.

Henry died on 4 January 1688 at Sheen Abbey, Surrey and was buried at the Church of St Mary Magdalene, Richmond, Surrey. As he and his wife were childless, his titles became extinct upon his death.

Political offices
Preceded by William Ashburnham	Cofferer of the Household; 1679–1685	Succeeded by Sir Peter Apsley
Parliament of England
Preceded by Sir Norton Knatchbull, Bt; Sir Charles Berkeley	Member of Parliament for New Romney; 1665–1668; With: Sir Norton Knatchbull, Bt	Succeeded by Sir Norton Knatchbull, Bt; Sir Charles Sedley, Bt
Peerage of Ireland
Preceded by William Brouncker	Viscount Brouncker; 1684–1688	Extinct
