= Dutch–Algerian War (1715–1726) =

Conflict between the Dutch Republic and the Regency of Algiers

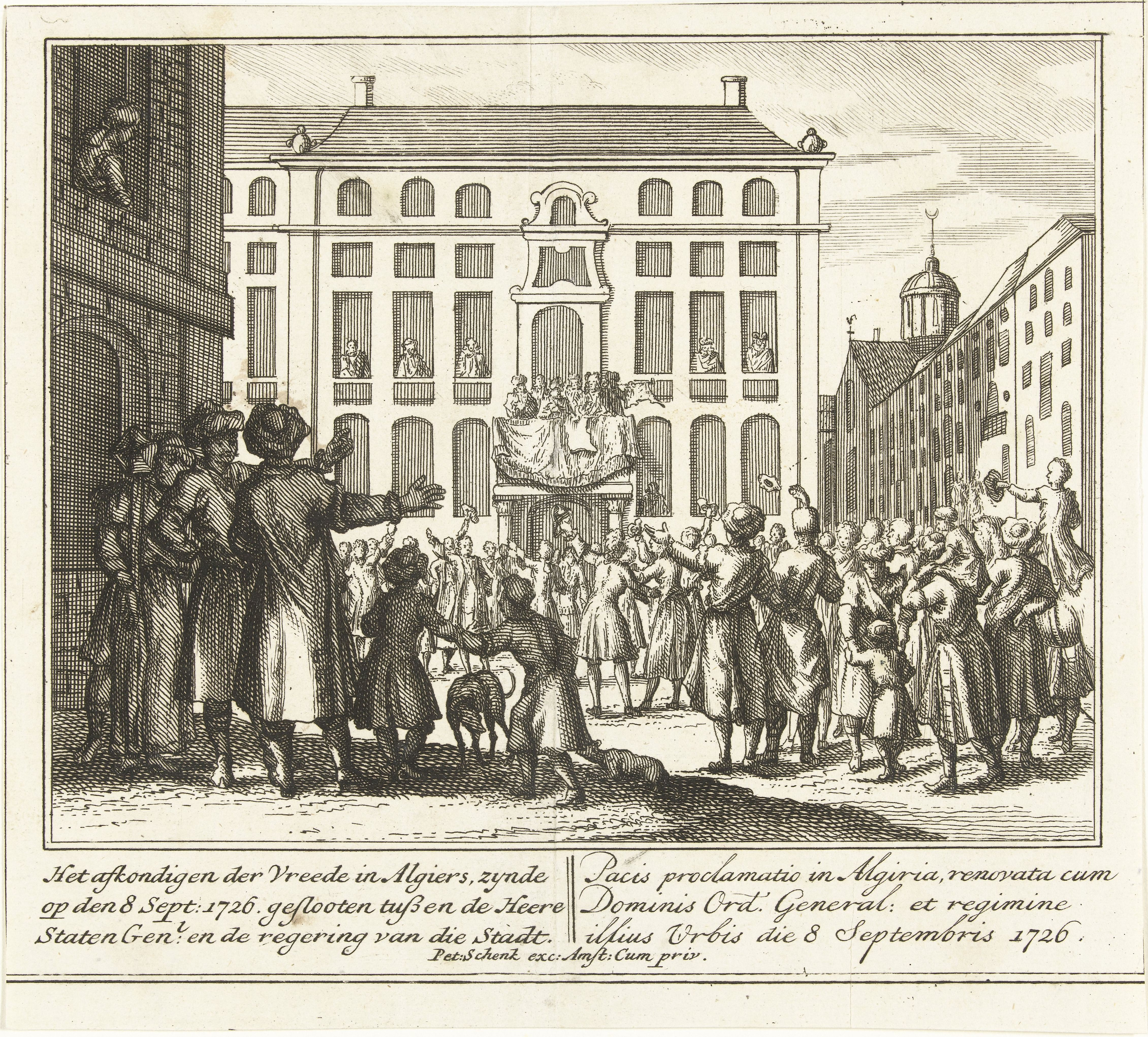
- The proclamation of the peace concluded between the States General and the government of Algiers, 1726. by Leonard Schenk
Date	1715–1726
Location	Mediterranean Sea
Result	See Aftermath

Belligerents
Regency of Algiers	Dutch Republic

Commanders and leaders
Baba Ali Chaouch; Mohamed Ben Hassan	(Dutch Republic) François van Aerssen (Dutch Republic) Cornelis Schrijver

Strength
1720: 27 warships 5 barques 4 galleys 3 galliots Other Algerian pirates	1716: 3 warships 1721: 8 warships 1723: 9 warships

Casualties and losses
12 ships sunk, 3 ships taken back by the Dutch, and 279 captured.	40–77 merchant vessels, and 900–1,292 sailors captured.

The Dutch–Algerian War (1715–1726) was conflict between the Dutch Republic and the Regency of Algiers. It commenced with initial successes for Algiers, involving the capture of numerous Dutch ships. However, as the war progressed, the Dutch managed to change the balance of naval successes. Ultimately, this, together with the eventuality of Britain, and France joining the war, and the Dutch blockade of the Strait of Gibraltar facilitated a peace treaty.

== Background ==
In 1712, Algiers entered into a preliminary agreement with the Dutch, which was officially ratified in 1713. However, it took the Dutch a year to gather and deliver the promised gifts, which proved futile. Wanting to seize and make prizes of enemy ships, Algerians pressured the Divan into declaring war on a nation. The Divan, in response, convened and conducted a vote to determine which nation to engage in war France, Great Britain, or the Dutch Republic. The majority cast its votes in favor of the Dutch Republic, leading to orders being issued to all ports to commence capturing Dutch ships. They voted for the Dutch since they made multiple promises, such as buying back Dutch captives, which they simply did not do.

== History ==
For a prolonged period, the Dutch authorities ignored the Algerian attacks on Dutch ships, including their declaration of war. This was largely due to the fact that all the Admiralties of the Dutch were exhausted by the War of the Spanish Succession. They did, however, send a small number of ships to try and keep the Algerians in check, however this was of no avail. Their shipping in the Mediterranean reached a significant low, with 7 ships being captured by Algerians. Nevertheless, the Dutch made numerous diplomatic efforts to swiftly end the war. They appealed to the Sultan of the Ottoman Empire, requesting his intervention to compel the Algerians to seek peace. Despite these diplomatic endeavors, the Algerians persisted in capturing Dutch ships.

In 1716, the Dutch adopted a different approach by dispatching a squadron of three warships to safeguard Dutch merchants and apprehend Barbary pirates. This strategy proved highly successful, as in 1717 not a single Dutch ship was captured. However, they were unable to capture any pirates. The Dutch then thought it was better to renew their old regulations for navigation in the Mediterranean, which concluded that every ships entering the Mediterranean must be armed, and have limited amount of sailors on board, which also proved successful. Finally, in the same year, October, negotiations commenced between the Dutch and Algiers. This process was facilitated through the Dutch consul in Istanbul. Unfortunately, these negotiations failed, as the Algerians demanded too much in the eyes of the Dutch.

From 1718 to 1720, the Dutch once again did not respond, assuming that the situation would mirror that of 1717, with the three warships keeping the Algerians in check. However, this proved far from the truth, as during this period, 25 ships were captured in the Mediterranean. (Note: This was not by only Algerians, these were the ones captured in total in the Mediterranean, including Moroccan, and other pirates.) On October 21, 1720, the Dutch consul in Livorno penned a letter to the States General, detailing the alarming situation with the Algerians, who were increasingly seizing ships. He implored the States General to institute new measures in response. Following this, the States General deliberated on the matter, and the provinces of Holland and Zeeland adopted a more assertive stance against the Algerians. On January 21, when news of new attacks on Dutch ships reached the States General, they upgraded the Mediterranean fleet with eight warships under Vice-Admiral François van Aerssen. However, due to some problems, he could only set sail in May. The formidable presence of this fleet had a pacifying effect on the Algerians, and there were even rumors in Algiers about a potential "Dutch invasion." In 1721, the Dutch experienced another disastrous year as 196 Dutch seamen and nine ships were captured by Algerians.During this, the Dutch managed to capture only 50 Algerians along with six ships in return. This was attributed to a disadvantage in speed, as the Dutch ships were slower than the Algerian ones.

In 1723, the Dutch escalated their war efforts by deploying a significantly faster ship under the command of Cornelis Schrijver. After Cornelis, and Van Aerssen held 3 renowned Algerian captains hostage the Dey had sent them invitation to negotiate peace. The negotiations lasted for two days; however, they proved fruitless. Cornelis and the States General felt greatly disappointed. Following this, they resumed their patrols. In 1725, they successfully captured two Algerian ships with 62 sailors, managing to repel and damage a significant number of Algerian vessels. However, they suffered a great loss of ten ships along with 76 sailors. Desperate to end Algerian attacks on Dutch ships, the Dutch negotiated an alliance with Britain and France. According to the agreement, Britain would assist if peace wasn't achieved within a year, and both France and Britain would close their ports to Algerian ships. In return, the Dutch would join the Alliance of Hanover. This arrangement gained approval from the Dutch and British authorities. Concurrently, the Dutch imposed a blockade on the Strait of Gibraltar, significantly impacting Algerian interests. Adding to the challenges for the Algerians, the Dutch experienced their most successful year in the war, destroying three fully-equipped Algerian battleships, while the Algerians captured only five small merchant ships with a limited number of sailors. This marked a significant shift in naval successes in favor of the Dutch.

== Aftermath ==
On September 25, 1726, Van Aerssen arrived before Algiers with eight warships. Accompanied by four companions, he approached the Dey and proposed the renewal of the peace agreement from 1712. Although the Algerians eventually accepted, they expressed skepticism, stating, "The whole navy feels like this peace will not last." As a gesture of goodwill, Van Aerssen presented a substantial gift worth 100,000 guilders, which was also utilized for the ransom of captives. The treaty was favorable to the Dutch, and following this war, Dutch trade in the Mediterranean surged again, benefiting from the peace, and Britain's conflict with Spain, the Dutch refrained from competing with Britain again after 1729. This peace proved to be enduring, marking the longest period of harmony between the Dutch and Algerians.

The war had cost several million guilders, so its end brought relief for the Dutch. After the peace agreement, the Dutch would no longer be enslaved by the Algerians, and those who were previously enslaved would be bought back by the Dutch who would pay a bargain. The Dutch also continued paying tribute. In the Dutch Republic, the populace was delighted with the peace, as it damaged Dutch trade in the Mediterranean. The States General of the Netherlands expressed satisfaction with the peace and complimented Van Aerssen for his excellent work. They even delivered a public speech lauding Van Aerssen for his efforts.
