= François van Aerssen =

Dutch naval officer and nobleman (1669–1740)

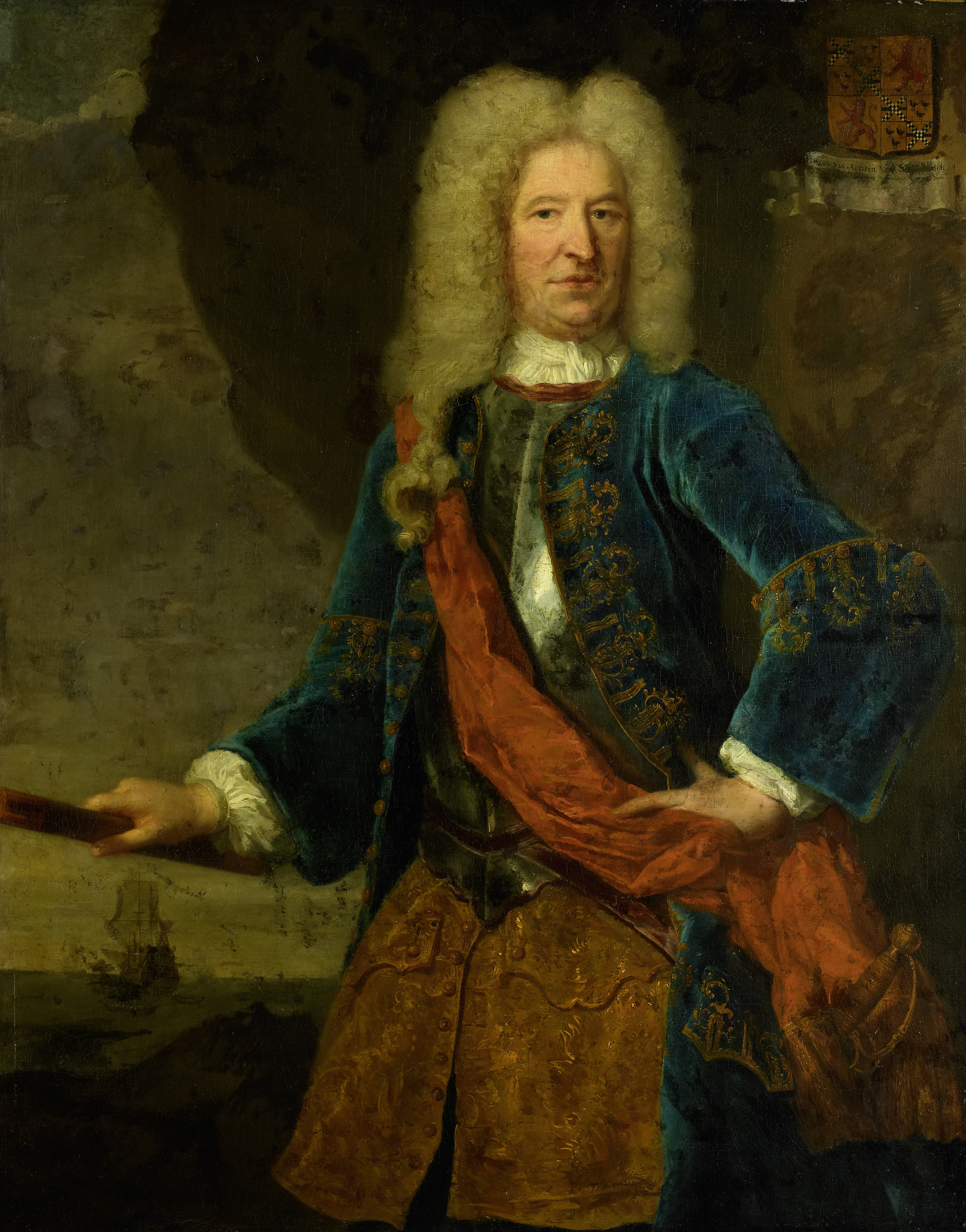
- Born: 14 June 1669; Dutch Republic
- Died: 19 July 1740 (aged 71); Dutch Republic
- Occupations: Naval officer
- Military career
- Allegiance: Dutch Republic
- Branch: Dutch States Navy
- Rank: Vice admiral
- Battles / wars: Nine Years' War; Battles of Barfleur and La Hougue; War of the Spanish Succession; Battle of Cádiz; Battle of Vigo Bay; First Siege of Barcelona; Second Siege of Barcelona; Capture of Minorca; Dutch-Algerian War

Vice-Admiral François van Aerssen (14 June 1669 – 19 July 1740) was a Dutch States Navy officer and nobleman. He fought in the Nine Years' War, the War of the Spanish Succession and Dutch-Algerian War and ended his military career at the rank of vice admiral.

== Life ==
=== Nine Years' War ===
During the Nine Years' War, Aerssen participated in the defence of the Dutch colony of Surinam against an attack by a French Navy fleet commanded by Admiral Jean-Baptiste du Casse in 1690. When firing signal flares, wanting to allow his subordinates to rest by firing them himself, he failed to take the proper precautions and his flare gun went off prematurely while Aerssen was loading it. The flare's primer went off and he was wounded in the face and lost several fingers on both hands. Aerssen was subsequently promoted to the rank of first lieutenant in the same year and extraordinary captain in 1692. He also participated in the battles of Barfleur and La Hougue, and Lieutenant-Admiral Gerard Callenburgh held him in high regard due to his skills as a naval officer.

=== War of the Spanish Succession ===
In 1696, Aerssen was promoted to the rank of regular captain, and went on to participate in the War of the Spanish Succession, fighting in the battle of Cádiz and the battle of Vigo Bay, both of which occurred in 1702. Three years later in 1705, he took part in the capture of Barcelona by a Grand Alliance force. In the following year, commanding 700 Dutch marines, Aerssen helped to lift a French siege of Barcelona. He also participated in the capture of Cartagena and Alicante by the Grand Alliance. In 1708, Aerssen took part in the capture of Minorca. He was promoted to the rank of Schout-bij-nacht in the next year, passing over Philip Schrijver and Cornelis Beeckman, both of whom had were highly meritorious officers, something which was attributed by his contemporaries to Aerssen's aristocratic background. The promotion infuriated many of Aerssen's contemporaries and overshadowed his career. Lieutenant-Admiral Cornelis Schrijver, Philip's son, wrote in 1766 that due to the promotion Philip "fell to his grave in a deadly chagrin".

In 1709, leading a Dutch squadron, Aerssen joined forces with elements of the British Royal Navy led by Vice-Admiral John Norris in the Mediterranean Sea to carry out operations against the French, though he was "not in a position to do much". The British subsequently attempted to capture eight French ships in the Corsican port city of Ajaccio, something which Aerssen refused to support as he noted the city was under the Republic of Genoa's control and the attack would violate Genoan neutrality. He subsequently participated in an Anglo-Dutch landing operation in Southern France, near Sète, which allowed for Grand Alliance troops to attack targets in the region in conjunction with French émigrés. However, the Duke de Noailles responded to the landing by marching with 4,000 French Royal Army troops to confront the invaders, which led to the British elements of the landing force to withdraw from France entirely and the invasion to end in failure. In a letter written to the clerk of the States General, Aerssen castigated the conduct of British forces during the invasion. In 1713, Aerssen was promoted to the rank of vice admiral.

=== Dutch-Algerian War ===
After the War of the Spanish Succession ended, the Dutch Republic became involved in a war against the Regency of Algiers. During his operations against the Barbary pirates, he experienced the disadvantages of the poor sailing qualities of the Dutch ships very strongly, and then worked hard to improve the Dutch shipbuilding, which whad fallen behind the French and British. Nevertheless, he was very successful several times against pirates and in 1726 he succeeded in making peace with Algiers on reasonable terms. In 1729, commanding a squadron of 12 ships, he joined forces with a British squadron under Vice-Admiral Sir Charles Wager at Spithead to act against the Spanish, with which Britain was at war. However, this tour came to nothing. After that, he did not perform any significant service.

== Sources ==
- Van der Aa, Abraham Jacob (1852). "François van Aerssen". Biographisch woordenboek der Nederlanden. Deel 1. Eerste en tweede stuk.
- Blok, P.J.; Molhuysen, P.C. (1914). "Aerssen, François van (2)". Nieuw Nederlandsch biografisch woordenboek. Deel 3.
