= Pieter van Woensel =

Pieter van Woensel may refer to:

- Pieter van Woensel (doctor) (1747–1808), Dutch physician, adventurer, writer and political cartoonist
- Pieter van Woensel (politician) (born 1970), former Dutch alderman and city councillor
