= Cornelis Schrijver =

Dutch States Navy officer and diplomat

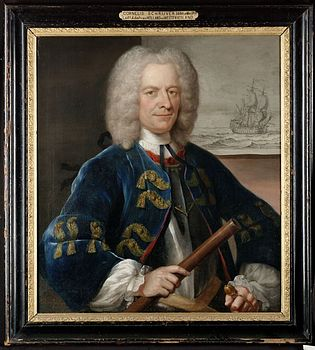
1736 portrait of Schrijver by Jan Maurits Quinkhard

Cornelis Schrijver (31 January 1687 –16 May 1768) was a Dutch States Navy officer and diplomat who attained the rank of lieutenant admiral. He was a prominent reformer who attempted to re-organize naval shipbuilding and personnel policy.

== Personal life ==
Schrijver was the second son of naval captain Philips Schrijver and Cornelia Tijloos, a daughter of naval captain Cornelis Tijloos. Philips was the son of the Amsterdam postmaster at the time, so he was not a real "patrician". This hindered his career when he had to compete for advancement with several members of the Dutch nobility. After having been passed over for promotion to admiral several times (despite having had a stellar career during the War of the Spanish Succession in the battles of Cadiz, Vigo Bay, Malaga, and Gibraltar) he resigned his commission in protest in 1710. Despite his modest ancestry due to wise investments he had amassed a respectable fortune of 200,000 guilders at his death.

As one of five children inheriting this fortune in 1711, Cornelis was therefore relatively wealthy. He married Maria le Plat in 1728 and had three daughters with her. Again, through frugality and wise investments she was able to bequeath the sum of 470,000 guilders to her two surviving daughters at her death in 1784.

== Career ==
Schrijver joined his father—a captain since 1690—aboard his ships from age 10 as a cabin boy. He received his commission as a naval lieutenant in 1702 and was promoted to captain on 17 January 1711. He had fought in the same battles as his father. He was promoted to vice-admiral in the Admiralty of Amsterdam in 1738, and to lieutenant-admiral in the same admiralty in 1748.

=== Gunboat diplomacy ===
After the Peace of Utrecht in 1713, the Dutch Republic entered a long period of peace, during which the navy was not involved in any major conflicts, and mostly operated together with the Royal Navy in a subordinate role, whenever the flag had to be shown. At the same time, the Dutch government was hard pressed for money, since the service of the national debt consumed almost all tax revenues, and taxation was already at a level that was considered "unsupportable." There was therefore no financing available for adequate maintenance of the fleet, let alone naval expansion. The Dutch navy therefore entered a period of neglect.

The only area in which the Dutch Republic was forced willy-nilly to conduct an independent diplomatic policy was that of the relationships with the so-called Barbary pirates, although they are better considered privateers conducting a legitimate commerce raiding in the context of properly declared wars. The Barbary Coast comprised a number of independently operating principalities, among which the Regency of Algiers, Tunis, and Tripoli, and the Moroccan Empire, the first three nominally part of the Ottoman Empire, but acting independently.

European powers like the Dutch Republic were regularly at war with some, if not all, of these entities, and during those wars privateers based in these "rogue states" freely preyed on their shipping and their crews. The ships were legitimately (under international law of the day) made prizes, and the crew members ended up as slaves. The European powers had two major options: station naval patrols in the area to protect their shipping from these depredations, or come to an accommodation with the local rulers the Dey of Algiers, and the Beys of Tunis and Tripoli, or the Emperor of Morocco. The latter was the least expensive in the long run.

The maintenance of a good relationship usually encompassed an annual tribute to the ruler, in exchange for which that ruler tried to hold back his subjects from capturing the shipping under the flag of the Republic. Unfortunately, the periods during which the peace was so maintained were short, and the relationship had to be continually monitored, and if necessary, repaired. This usually worked best when the envoys did not come empty handed, but brought along hard money for bribes, and an adequate naval presence for further persuasion.

Schrijver was several times sent out in the early 1730s, to act as a gunboat diplomat at the head of a Dutch squadron of frigates. Before that he had in 1724 captured and destroyed several Algerian and Moroccan privateers as captain of an individually operating frigate. One of those privateers was the former Dutch ship Oranjeboom(36) under Algerian flag (master Raïs Ben Taback). She had a crew of 250 among whom 26 Christian slaves, who were released.

In 1729, he was captain-commodore of a cruising squadron of six frigates that first managed to liberate two ships of the Dutch East India Company, that had been captured in peacetime by Algerian privateers. These ships, the Purmerlust and Ter Horst of the Amsterdam Chamber of the VOC, did not possess passes provided by an Algerian Consul, and were therefore initially declared lawful prizes. Schrijver (whose squadron lay in the roadstead of Algiers at the time they were brought in) managed to convince the Dey that these ships were the property of the Dutch state and therefore did not need passes. He negotiated an agreement under which the ships were released in exchange for half of the bullion they were transporting to the Dutch East Indies: a value of 137,000 guilders. In 1731, he was again put in command of a squadron of frigates that was formally sent out to Algiers to convey the annual tribute to the Dey. This mission was very successful: he managed to obtain a few concessions on the existing peace treaty with Algiers, safeguarding the position of VOC ships.

On both occasions Schrijver managed to negotiate the ransom of a large number of enslaved Dutch crew members. Though this was technically "slave trading" it will be clear that the object of the transaction was to free the prisoners, and should not be held against him. As a matter of fact, due to the frequency of enslavement of Dutch sailors by Barbary pirates, there existed so-called slave treasuries in the Dutch Republic that acted as a form of kidnap and ransom insurance. Schrijver used money provided by these treasuries to finance the ransoming. (Note: Cf. the Slavenkas Zierikzee) Those that still belonged to the Algerian state, and therefore could be ransomed directly, brought 1,828 guilders for officers, surgeons, mates, and carpenters. Non-Dutch prisoners, taken in Dutch ships, were cheaper. The Algerians let them go for 408 guilders each.

=== Naval construction ===
During his cruise to the Barbary Coast in 1724, Schrijver commanded the frigate Wageningen. This ship was a fortunate exception to the rule that Dutch ships were too slow to successfully pursue and capture the usually more nimble and speedy corsairs. As a matter of fact, Wageningen was the only ship in the squadron that had any success in capturing corsairs. This was a constant worry for Schrijver and other Dutch captains, who usually were forced to follow in the wake of the ships of foreign navies. Schrijver and others were of the opinion that the relatively unimpressive performance of Dutch naval ships was due to the backwardness of the admiralty shipyards that built most of the Dutch naval ships in both design methods and construction methods. Schrijver made his opinion known in loud and undiplomatic tones, and his criticisms endeared him to one of the members of the Amsterdam Admiralty Board, Lubbert Adolph Torck who shared his negative opinions.

In 1726, Torck ordered Schrijver to recruit one or more British shipwrights to take over as superintendent of the Amsterdam Admiralty shipyard, in hopes that this might help introduce the "British" methods of ship-design and construction in the Dutch Republic. This recruitment effort failed due to the opposition of the British government, but in 1727, three British shipwrights were persuaded to come to Amsterdam: Thomas Davis, Charles Bentham, and John May. One of the "advanced" techniques the British recruits were to introduce was the use of engineering drawings and of "dockyard models".

As one of his first ships, built according to the "new, British" methods, Davis designed the ship of the line Provincie van Utregt in 1728. Schrijver was the first captain assigned the command of this ship and he sailed her on her maiden voyage in 1729 to Plymouth, where it became part of a joint Anglo-Dutch squadron. In Plymouth, the ship was tested against the fastest British ship of the line of the time, HMS Monmouth, in a four-day regatta under various circumstances and the contest ended undecided, Utregt being faster "before the wind", and Monmouth faster in close-hauled courses. But during the voyage to Plymouth Schrijver discovered signs of sabotage: the scuppers were blocked with shipyard debris, apparently in an attempt to make the ship founder during a storm. This must have been done by the shipyard personnel in an apparent attempt to make the "new methods" look bad; at least that was Schrijver's opinion at the time. Davis was soon driven out by the criticism of Dutch rivals and succeeded as superintendent of the Amsterdam shipyard by Bentam, who immediately was championed in future conflicts by Schrijver.

During his lifetime the rivalry between the British designers in the Amsterdam admiralty shipyard—championed by Schrijver—and the Dutch superintendents of the other admiralty yards became a heated controversy. Schrijver was by then a respected lieutenant-admiral who had a close political relationship with the new stadtholder and Admiraal Generaal of all the Dutch provinces, William IV, Prince of Orange, who came to power at the end of the Second Stadtholderless Period, and acted as his adviser in a number of reforms of the Dutch navy that remained still-born due to obstruction of the Dutch shipwrights and the untimely death of William in 1751. Schrijver gave vent to his frustrations with the state of Dutch naval construction in an article in the periodical Boekzael der geleerde waerelt, published in 1755, in which he proposed to translate the French and British naval regulations, and several foreign technical works on the theory of naval construction.

This article was formulated in such confrontational terms that it caused a furor in Dutch naval circles. Several shipwrights from other admiralty shipyards published polemical pamphlets, in which they showed—for the first time, because previously they had considered this proprietary information—that they too used technical drawings and even towing experiments in ship model basins to improve the hydrodynamic characteristics of ships. In other words, the Dutch shipbuilders were not as "backward" as Schrijver—and historians like Johannes Cornelis de Jonge—have asserted.

The "bad" performance of Dutch ships was a consequence of a basic constraint on Dutch ship design: the draft could not go over certain depths, because the shallowness—in the days before large scale dredging—of the Dutch coastal and river waterways made that impossible. Ingenious constructions like ship camels brought only limited relief. As the Dutch still needed to construct big ships of the line to compete with foreign navies, they had to use broad and flat-bottomed designs, and these were hydro-dynamically penalized. No amount of foreign technical innovation could remedy that. Like the other admiralty shipyards, the Amsterdam yard, under British management, could not evade this restriction.

== Other controversies ==
Schrijver's character was described as difficult which did not make him popular among his colleagues. His polemical approach often hindered him in his attempts to promote reforms, however well-intentioned and thought-out they may have been, than that it helped him achieve his goals. (Note: De Jonge, from whose work this appreciation is taken, spends a page and a half excoriating Schrijver's character flaws; de Jonge, pp. 108–110.) In his final years Schrijver published a number of polemical works:

- Omstandige brief of memorie aan Z.D.H. den Prins van Oranje ... over de redenen van het groote verval van 's Lands zeemagt, a memorandum about the decline of the contemporary Dutch navy for stadtholder William in 1747
- Twee voorname articulen, om te dienen tot redres in de vervallen zeedienst van de republiek en particulier in 'slands zeemagt, tot maintien van de goede ordres, a memorandum on reform of the articles of war for the navy, sent in 1755 to Anne, Princess Royal and Princess of Orange
- Memorie betreffende een Tafereel van de cruelle behandeling, in which he complained about grievances his grandfather Cornelis Tijloos, his father Philips Schrijver and he himself had about the way they were treated) published in 1756
- Verdediging van C. Schrijver Anno 1767, another complaint about his personal grievances about the way his accomplishments had not been recognized

Of a more positive nature was a plan he conceived and published in 1745 at the request of the WIC for the fortification of the island of Curaçao.
