= Admiraliteitslijnbaan, Amsterdam =

Ropewalk of the Admiralty of Amsterdam
- Admiraliteitslijnbaan
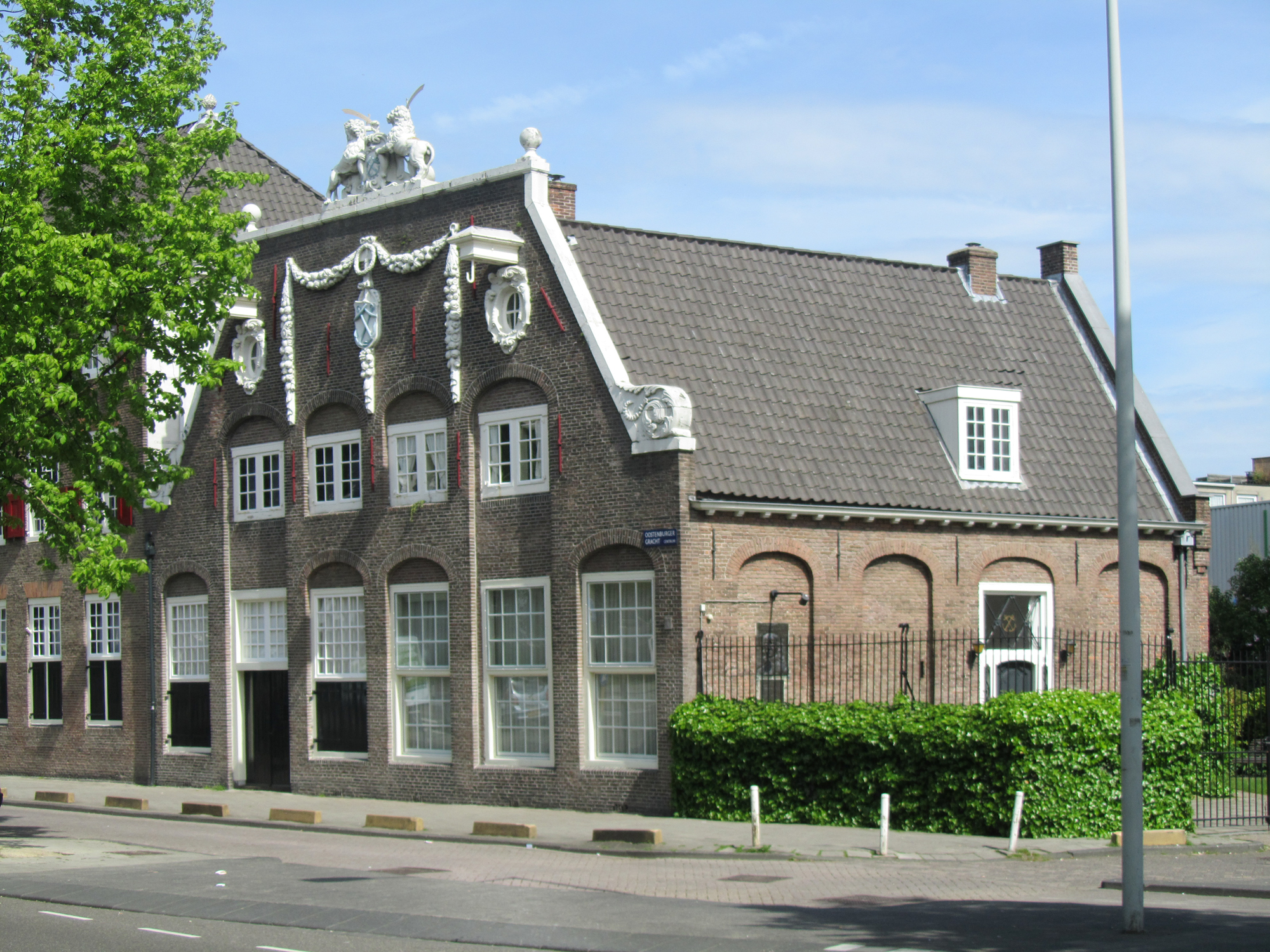

General information
- Address: Oostenburgergracht 79-81
- Town or city: Amsterdam
- Country: Netherlands
- Coordinates: 52°22′5″N 4°55′29″E
- Designations: Rijksmonument

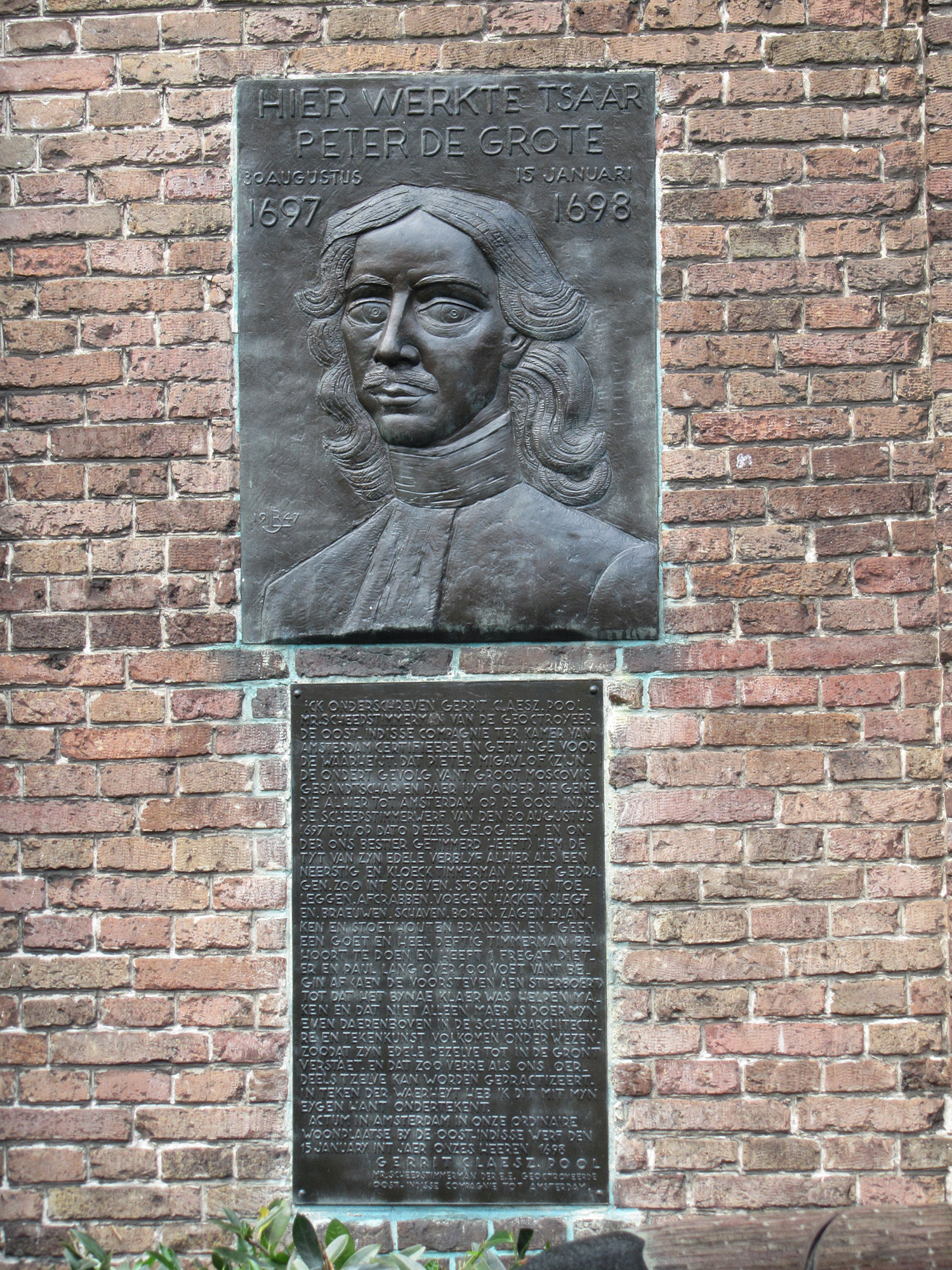
Commemorative plaque for Czar Peter the Great, who may have stayed here in 1697 during his apprenticeship at the Amsterdam shipyards

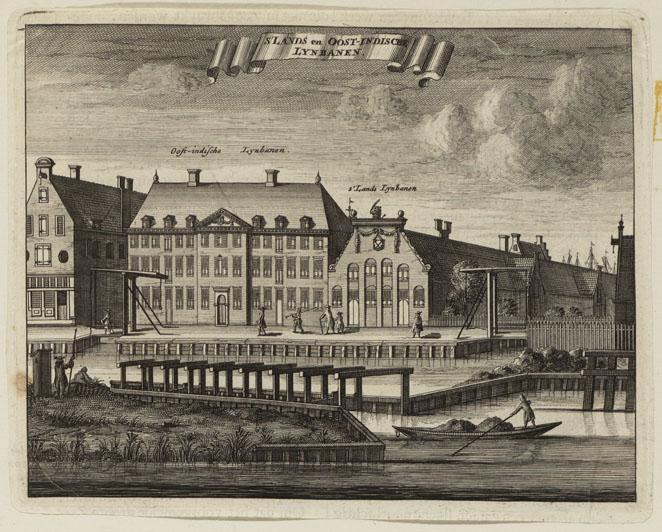
Caspar Commelin's 1693 print showing the ropewalks of the Admiralty of Amsterdam and the Dutch East India Company

The Admiraliteitslijnbaan (Ropewalk of the Admiralty of Amsterdam) is a 17th-century building on Oostenburgergracht canal in Amsterdam. It has held rijksmonument status since 1970. A plaque on one side of the building commemorates Czar Peter the Great, who may have stayed here in 1697 during his apprenticeship at the Amsterdam shipyards.

The Admiraliteitslijnbaan originally served as the front building of the ropewalk of the Admiralty of Amsterdam. The covered ropewalk behind the building stretched some 500 meters to the IJ bay, between the Oostenburgervaart canal and Conradstraat.

The trapezoid-shaped facade dates to 1660 and is richly decorated with festoons, two oeil-de-boeuf-windows and niches with arched tops, some stretching vertically over both floors. The top of the facade is decorated with a sculpture of two lions with bronze swords resting against a coat of arms showing two crossed blue anchors, the symbol of the Admiralty of Amsterdam. The same coat of arms has also been incorporated into the festoons.

Adjacent to the building is the Ropewalk of the Dutch East India Company, which also dates to 1660. The ropewalks behind the buildings no longer exist. It is now a residential area with street names that refer to the history of the location, such as Compagniestraat, Touwbaan and Admiraliteitstraat.

== History ==
Around 1655, the wharfs of the Admiralty of Amsterdam were moved to the islands of Kattenburg and Oostenburg. The Admiraliteitslijnbaan was constructed on Oostenburg in 1660 as a ropewalk and warehouse for the ships of the Admiralty. The area stretched some 500 meters and was surrounded by thick stone walls, as the tar pots and tarred wood used in the ropewalk were a serious fire hazard. There were two separate ropewalks: a large ropewalk where thick cables were made and a smaller one for ropework and other activities. The attics were used for storage.

On 12 January 1673, after a fire broke out at the Admiraliteitslijnbaan, it was put out using fire hoses with fog nozzles designed by Jan van der Heyden, the first time such fog nozzles were used.

After the Admiralty was dissolved in 1795, the building came to be known as 's Rijks Lijnbaan or 's Lands Lijnbaan (National Ropewalk). Over the course of the 19th century, the building and adjacent Ropewalk of the Dutch East India Company were left to slowly decay. In 1887 the ropewalks had become so derelict that they were closed. Around 1920 the ropewalks were demolished, and only the front buildings were left standing. The area was then used as a military storage facility where military vehicles, clothing, gear and other goods were stored. The area remained in military use until 1983. In 1985, the storage buildings were occupied by squatters. This lasted until 1988, when the squatters were evicted and the buildings were demolished.

On 25 September 1947, a plaque showing Czar Peter the Great was attached to one side of the building. The plaque commemorates that Peter the Great may have stayed there in 1697 during his apprenticeship at the Amsterdam shipyards.

=== Restoration ===
The building underwent restoration during the period 1949–1950. The western part of the building was subsequently occupied by the Werkspoormuseum, while the eastern part remained a residence. The facade was left largely intact, although the window arrangement was changed. During the restoration, the lion sculpture was added to the top of the facade. This sculpture originally stood on the back facade of the ropewalk complex and had, after the demolition around 1920, ended up in the garden of the National Maritime Museum. A back facade was also added to the building, created out of bricks from demolished warehouses on Bickersgracht canal. The year 1949 is shown on the back facade. Inside, most of the woodwork was replaced. Only the mantelpiece survived World War II, the rest of the woodwork was removed by local residents and used as firewood during the war. The museum opened in 1950, and on 29 July of that year, the restored building was officially opened by then-mayor Arnold Jan d'Ailly. The museum closed its doors in 2011.

== See also ==
- 's Lands Zeemagazijn
