= Bickersgracht =

Canal in Amsterdam

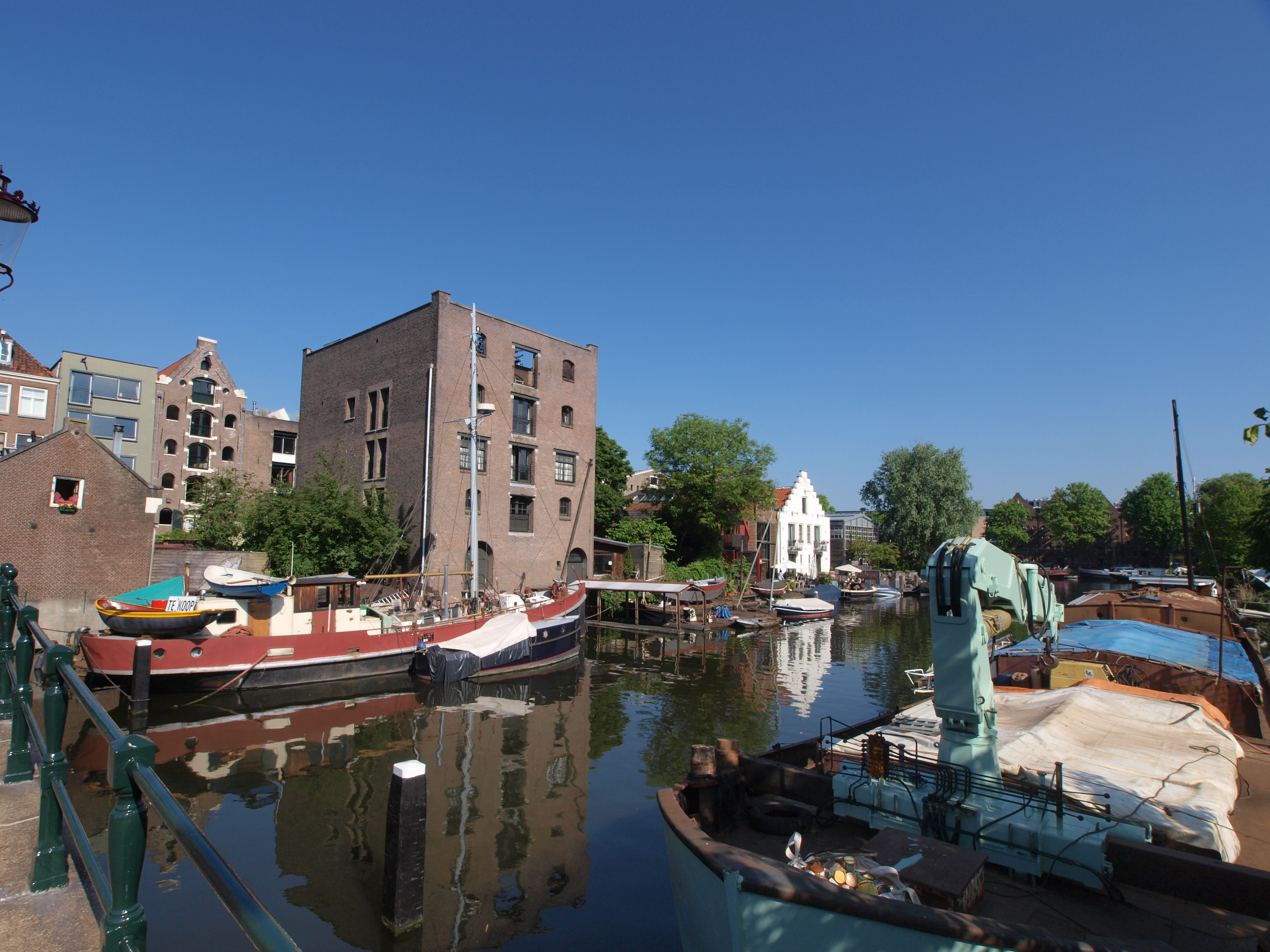
- Bickersgracht and Prinseneiland

- Location within Amsterdam
- Location: Amsterdam
- Postal code: 1013
- Coordinates: 52.385085°N 4.888239°E
- South end: Eilandsgracht
- To: Realengracht

The Bickersgracht (Dutch pronunciation: [ˈbɪkərsˌxrɑxt]) is a canal in the center of Amsterdam at Westelijke Eilanden (Western Islands), but also a street.

== Location ==
The Bickersgracht runs in north-south direction between Bickerseiland and Prinseneiland. The Galgenbrug (bridge no. 315) was constructed between Galgenstraat on Prinseneiland and Kleine Bickersstraat on Bickerseiland. From the street and the bridge, originally a bascule bridge, now a fixed bridge, one had a good view of the gallows of the Volewijck, north of the IJ.

East of the canal and the former location of the shipyards runs a public road. This street, between the houses and the "overtuinen" is paved with cobblestones.

There are seven 17th and 18th century buildings on the Bickersgracht that have been designated as national monuments: six residential houses and warehouse de Faam (Bickersgracht 256), from around 1650. The Dierencapel, a children 's farm, is located at Bickersgracht.

== History ==
The canal is named after Jan Bicker, who bought Bickerseiland in 1631. A number of shipyards, sheds and places to store timber were erected along the Bickersgracht and Westerdok. In the middle of the island a house with a tower was built for the shipping magnate Bicker. This building was demolished around 1700 to make way for more houses.

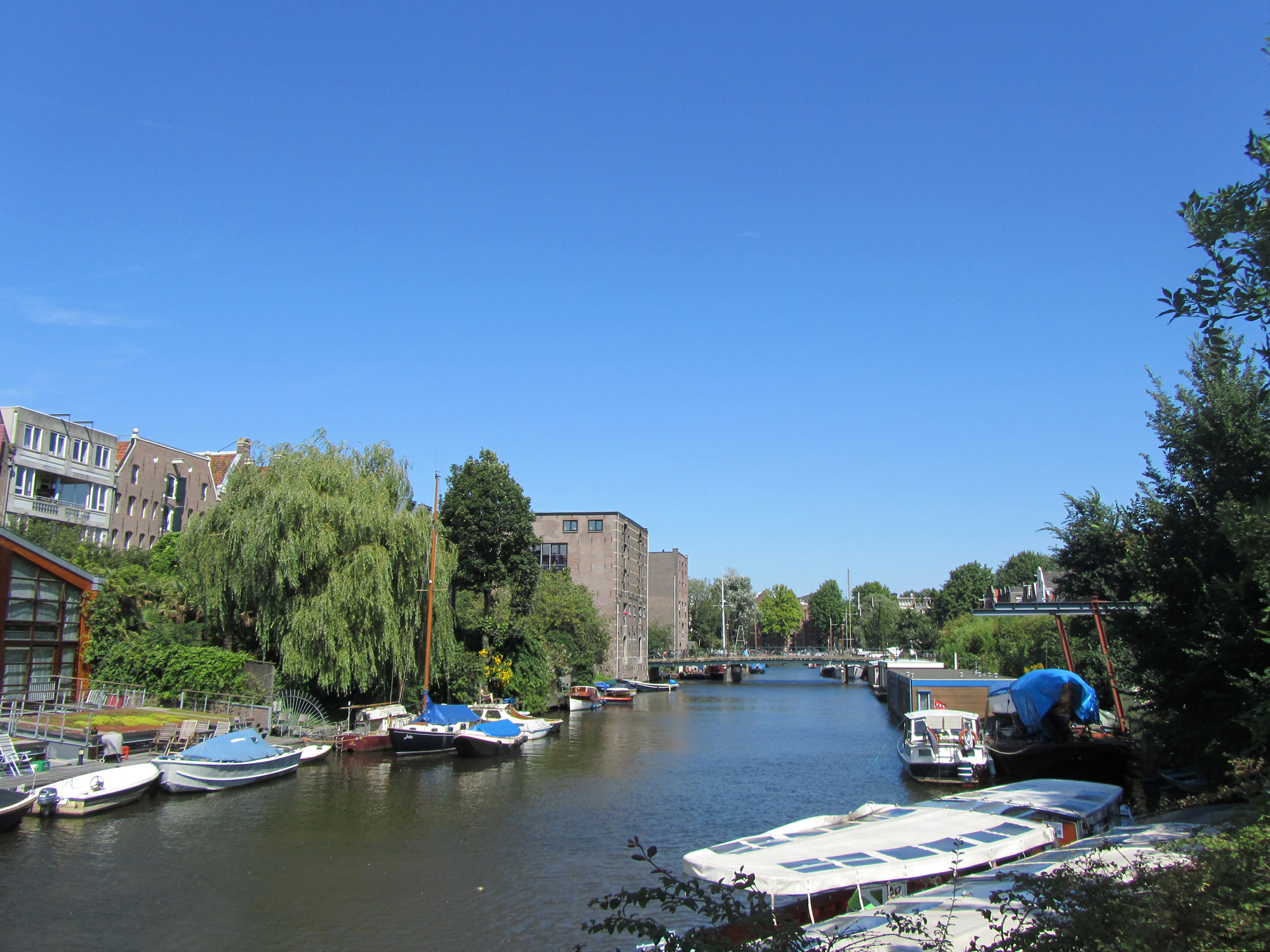
BickersgrachtBi

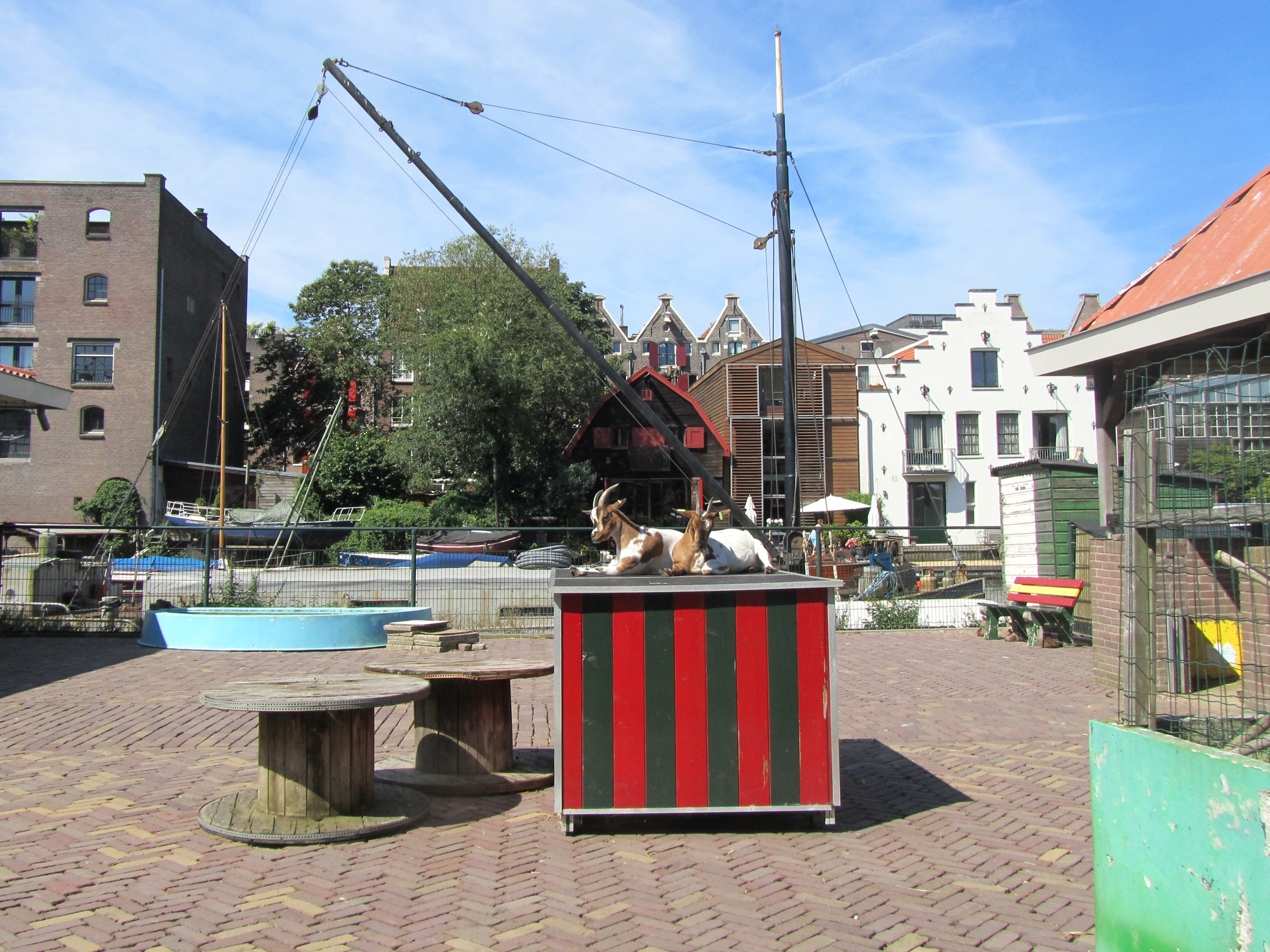
Children's farm

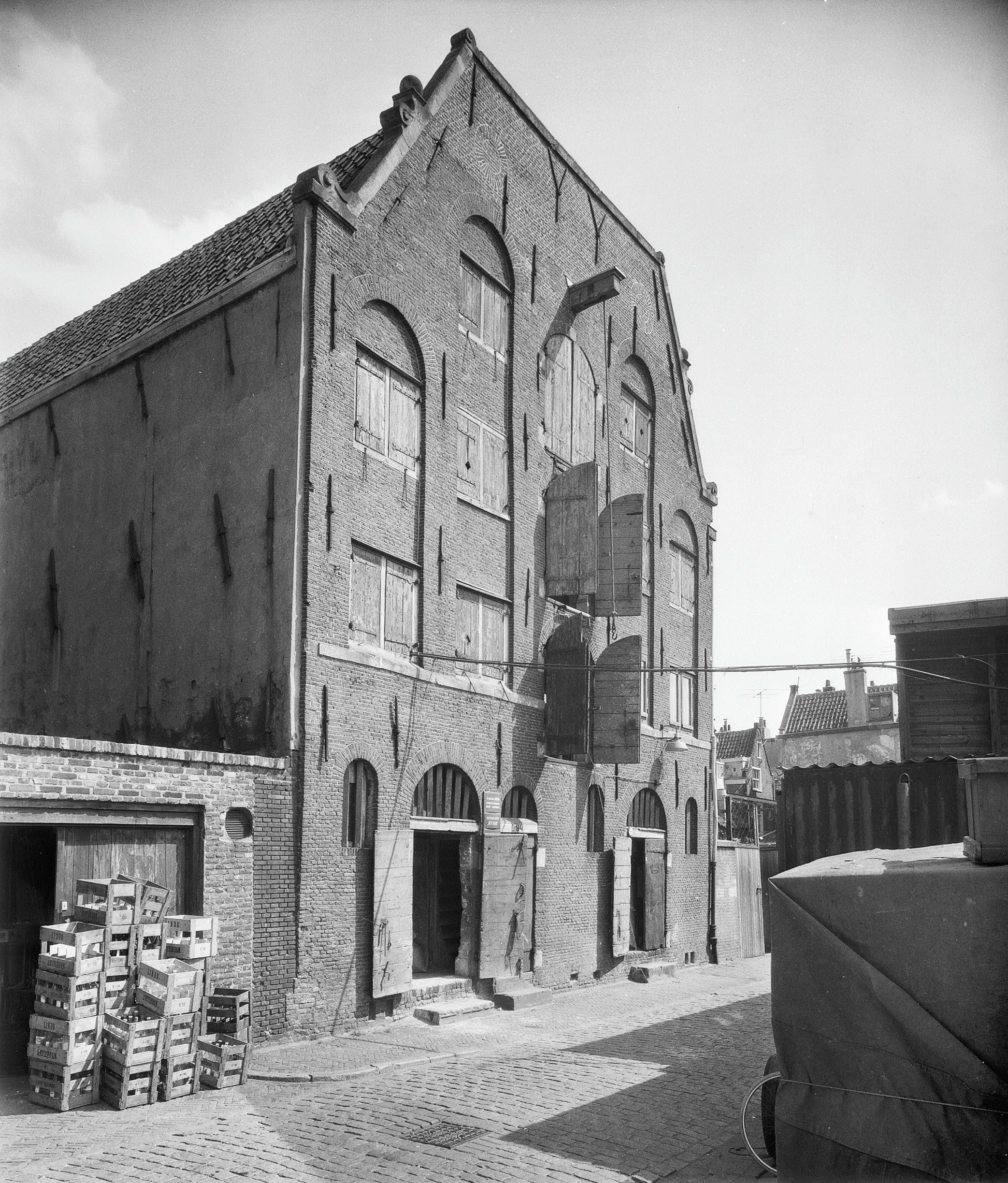
Warehouse "De Faam" (front), Bickersgracht 94, 1959

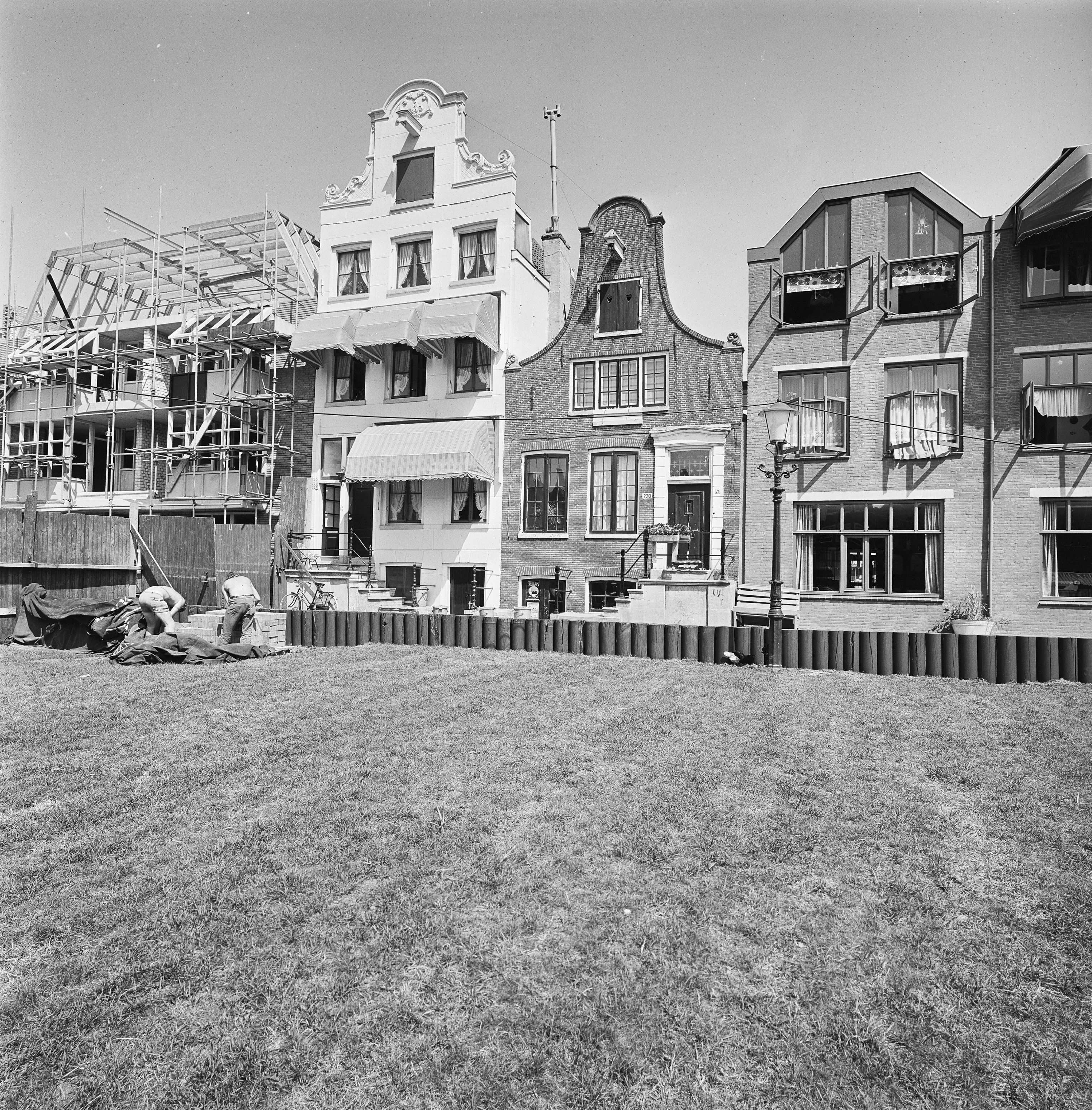
Facades on Bickerseiland on the Bickersgracht, 1976

== See also ==
- Canals of Amsterdam
