= John May (shipwright) =

English shipwright (1694–1779)

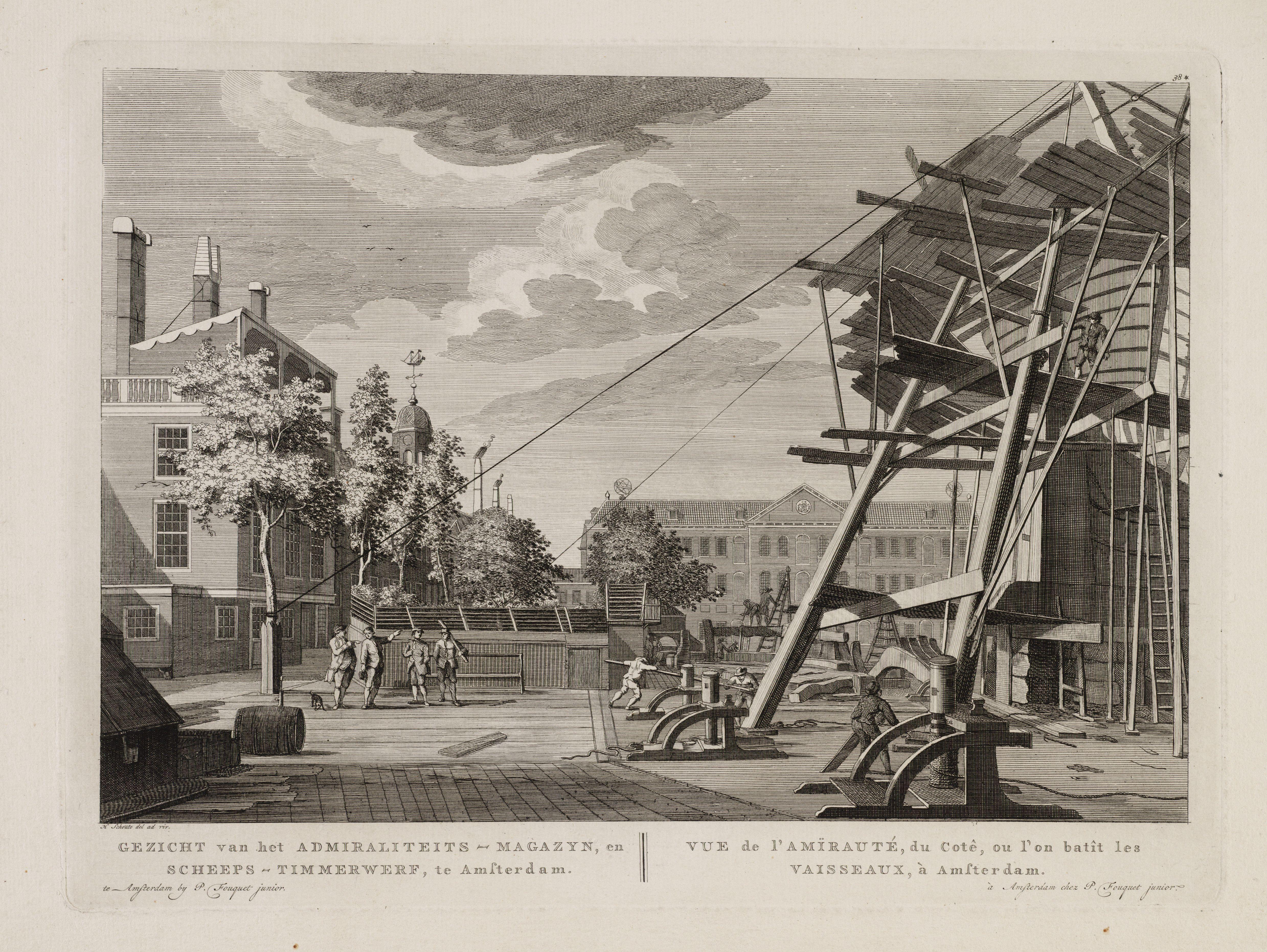
A shipwright and the main buildings of the Amsterdam Admiralty by Pierre Fouquet (1729-1800)

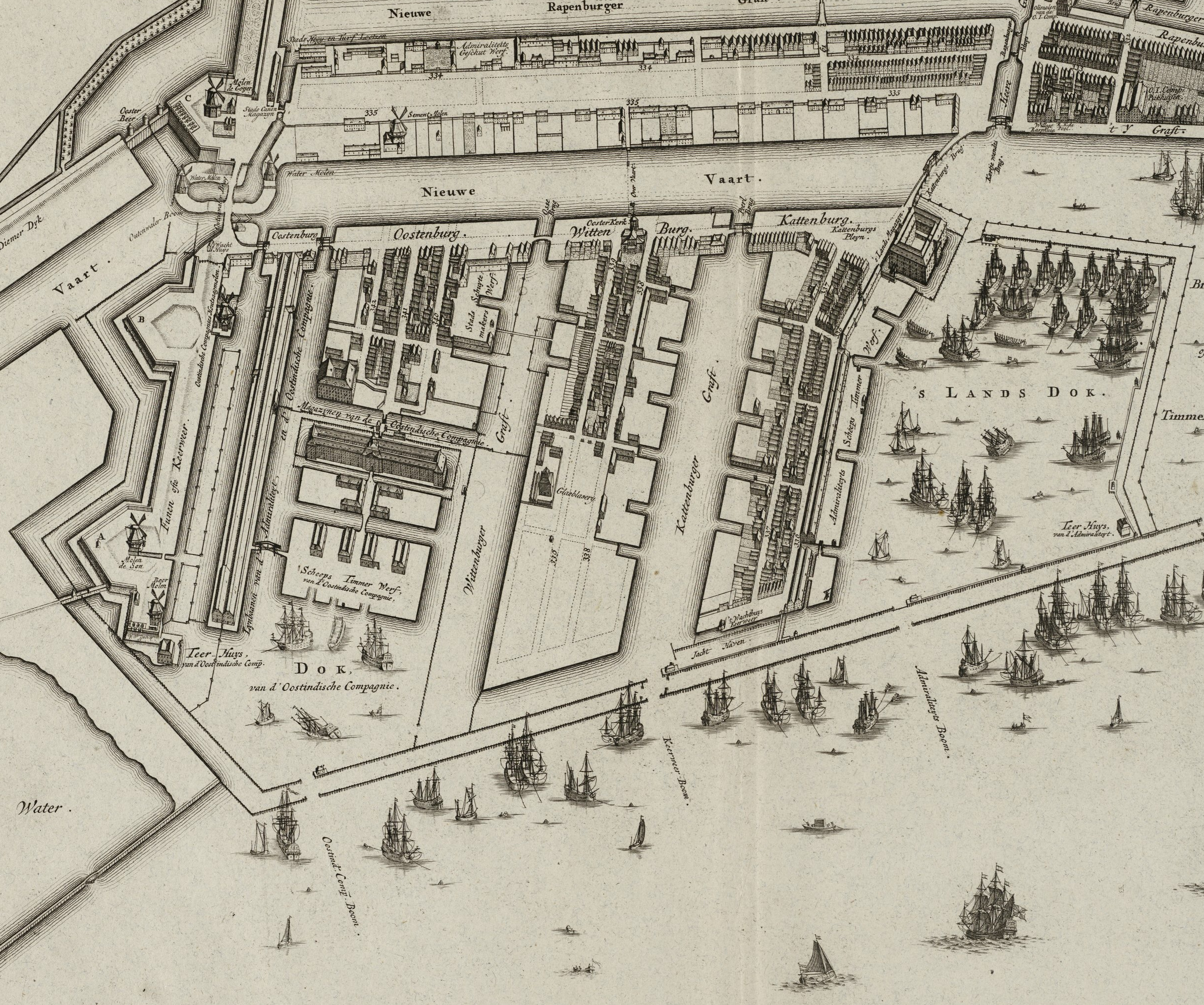
The "Oostelijke Eilanden" in Amsterdam on a map by Gerrit de Broen, dated ~1782.

John May Sr or Jan Maij (1694–1779) was an English shipwright from Chatham who served from 1758 to 1779 as Master Shipbuilder of the Amsterdam Admiralty.

== Career ==
John May was hired in 1728 by the Amsterdam Admiralty. In 1727 this Admiralty, the largest of the five Dutch Admiralties, had hired Charles Bentham and Thomas Davis to work for them in improving ship design. John May served as the assistant to Charles Bentam for three decades. May taught the art of shipbuilding, and after the death of Bentam in 1758, he was appointed Master Shipbuilder and would serve in the position for 21 years. In 1761, May was accused of belonging to a camarilla with Count of Gronsveld which managed the Admiralty.

== Family ==
In 1714 he married Rebecca Pensix (-1743) a spinster from Gillingham; the couple had five children who lived to adulthood: Job, John, William, Rebecca, and George. In 1762, he married Magteld Geertruy Kannegieter of Amsterdam.

His son John May Jr or Johannes Maij (Rochester (1724-1782) married Martha Naudin in March 1753; the couple had five daughters. At that time he lived at Reguliersgracht, but moved to Keizersgracht near Westerkerk. May traded in company with J.A. Crop on Narva, Reval and Riga, a decade later on the Caribbean. In March 1776, at the beginning of the American Revolutionary War, they shipped weapons and horses from Deptford to North-America. During the Fourth Anglo-Dutch War he was pro-British, and the company liquidated in 1782.

Job May, also a shipwright, owned the shipyard Yhoek on Wittenburg, which John bought in 1767. In 1790 it was sold by (his son-in-law) Isaac ten Cate who took over his business and involved in setting up a training for sailors. In 1793 John's daughter Elisabeth married Paul Busti, a real estate agent, operating the Holland Land Company in Philadelphia.

William May (Maij) (Chatham 1725-1807), a captain and equipment master from 1780, devised various innovations in shipbuilding and cooperated with Robert Seppings. He played a role on 30 May 1787 when the Admiralty was occupied and his house was besieged during the Patriot revolt. He escaped with his family across the Y. In December 1787 he appointed as captain of a civic guard. William was the father of Job Seaborn May, midshipman and Rear Admiral, who played an important role on 15 November 1813 so the French general Molitor decided to leave Amsterdam. At the end of the month he arrived with William I of the Netherlands at Scheveningen.

== Designs ==
John May, Sr's designs in alphabetical order are:

1. Admiraal de Ruyter, 3rd charter, on stocks at Amsterdam 22 July 1777, launched 13 November 1778, captured by British. Dimensions 167½ x 46 9/11 x 20½, 60-68 guns, 350-450 men.#Alarm, 7th charter, on stocks 14 August 1773, launched 22 July 1774, captured by British 1799? Dimensions (Amsterdam foot) 125 7/11 x 34 x 13 2/11, 24 guns, 150 men.
2. Alphen, 6th charter, 1766, exploded in battle 1778. Dimensions (Amsterdam foot) 139 8/11 (lower deck) x 37 8/11 x 15 8/11, 36 guns.
3. Argo, 5th charter, on stocks 14 December 1771, launched 9 December 1772, sold? 1785-1787
4. Bellona, 6th charter, 1768, condemned 1796, dimensions (Amsterdam foot) 139 8/11 (lower deck) x 37 8/11 x 15 8/11, 36 guns, 230 men.
5. Beverwijk, 6th charter, 1767, sold 1784, dimensions 139 8/11 (lower deck) x 37 8/11 x 15 8/11, height between decks 7'2¾", 36 guns, 230 men.
6. Bloys van Treslong, 5th charter, 1754, sold 1782, dimensions 141 (lower deck) x 39 7/11 x 17 7/11, 44 guns.
7. Boreas, 7th charter 1768, last mentioned 1786, dimensions 123 4/11 (prow) x 33 7/11 x 12½, height between decks 6'6", 24 guns.
8. Erfprins, 4th charter 1770, wrecked 1783, dimensions 154½ x 43 x 20 guns, 52-56, 300 men.
9. Hof van Souburg, 6th charter 1761, condemned 1788, dimensions 139 8/11 (prow) x 37 8/11 x 15 8/11, 36 guns, 130 men.
10. Holland, 3rd charter, 1761, sunk 1781, dimensions 167½ (lower deck) x 45 8/11 x 20, 64-68 guns.
11. Kennemerland, 4th charter, 1761, burnt 1778, dimensions 153 (lower deck) x 43 x 20, 54 guns.
12. Leiden 3rd charter, on stocks at Amsterdam 17 september 1784, launched 26 july 1786, captured by British 1799, dimensions 167½ (lower deck) x 46 9/11 x 20½, 68 guns.
13. Mars, 5th charter, 1769, captured by British 1781, dimensions 139 8/11 (lower deck) x 37 8/11 x 15 8/11, 32-36 guns.
14. Nassau, 3rd charter, 1759, broken up 1784, dimensions 167½ (prow) x 45 8/11 x 20½, 64-68 guns, 450 men.
15. Nassau Weilburg, 4th charter, 1760, wrecked 1783, dimensions 153 (lower deck) x 43 x 20, 52-54 guns, 300 men.
16. Prinses Royaal, 2nd charter, 1759, stricken 1780, dimensions 182 3/11 (lower deck) x 49 5/11 x 20, 72-74 guns.
17. Valk, 7th charter 1770, captured 1799, dimensions 125 7/11 x 34 x 13 2/11, 24 guns, 158-163 men.
18. Venus, 7th charter 1768, captured by British 1796, dimensions 125 7/11 x 33 7/11 x 13 2/11, 24 guns, 156 men.
19. Waakzaamheid, 7th charter 1769, captured by French 1794, dimensions 125 7/11 x 34 x 13 2/11, 20-24 guns, 150-175 men.
20. Weststellingwerf, 7th charter 1755, stricken 1781, dimensions 122 x 14 x 12 8/11, 22-24 guns.
21. Zephier, 6th charter 1767, wrecked 1783, dimensions 139 8/11 (lower deck) x 37 8/11 x 15 8/11, 36 guns, 230 men.
22. Zwieten, 5th charter, 1759, last mentioned 1782, dimensions 141 (lower deck) x 39 7/11 x 17 7/11, 44 guns, 250 men.
