= Thomas Davis (shipwright) =

English shipwright

- Occupation: Shipwright
- Known for: Work in repairing the Amsterdam Admiralty

Thomas Davis was an English shipwright.

== Amsterdam Admiralty ==
In 1727 the Amsterdam Admiralty, the largest of the five Dutch Admiralties that made up the Dutch Navy, brought in Davis, Charles Bentham and John May to work for them in improving ship design and avoiding the wreck after wreck they had recently been suffering.
