= Charles Bentham =

English shipwright

- Occupation: shipwright

Charles Bentham was an English shipwright. In 1727 the Amsterdam Admiralty brought in Bentham and two other English shipwrights (John May and Thomas Davis) to work for them in improving ship design and avoiding the wreck after wreck they had recently been suffering. Bentham created moulds and draughts which became very influential in the standardisation of the Dutch ships from the 1740s onwards.
