= Pieter van Woensel (doctor) =

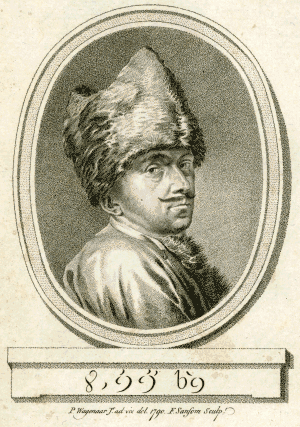
Pieter van Woensel

Pieter van Woensel (1747 in Haarlem – 1808 in The Hague) was a physician, adventurer, travel writer, navy medical officer, political cartoonist and a colourful, atheist author under the Turkish pseudonym Amurath-Effendi Hekim-Bachi (‘Chief Physician Mister Amurath’) in the satirical almanac de Lantaarn (the Lamp). Typical for Van Woensel is his love for the peculiar, dislike for the easy route, and inborn tendency towards the paradoxical.

== Life ==
Van Woensel was a student at the Leiden University. In 1771 he left for Saint Petersburg as an army physician. For an appointment at the Hospital of the Petersburg Cadets, he had Jan Hendrik van Kinsbergen to thank. In 1780, he returned to Amsterdam. His brief communications in 1780 and 1782 on his findings of improving the treatment of whooping cough (in young Russian cadets) continued to be cited in the specialist literature well into the 1830s. In 1781, he published the Present State of Russia, a book that was translated into French, German, Polish, Italian and Russian. In 1782, he published Précis, a much reworked French summary of Abbot Raynal’s Histoire des deux Indes, followed by a further abridged and paraphrased Dutch version, as Tafreel, in 1784. Curiously, he appears to have removed all its content regarding anti-colonialism and the abolition of slavery. Unrest drove him and in 1784, he spent one and a half years in Constantinople and published on Turkish society in 1791, an important reason why his work caused so much interest.

He joined a group of Englishmen travelling to India, via Bagdad, but already in Diyarbakır he decided to travel by himself because the company bored him. After a stay in Erzurum, he crossed the Pontic Mountains in bad weather, and spent several days in plague-ridden Trabzon on the Black Sea, before sailing to the Crimea, where he settled in Sevastopol for two years as a navy doctor in Russian service. He describes the visit of Catharina II of Russia to the newly conquered territory. His research on the plague appeared in French in St. Petersburg (1788) and was translated into Russian by Andrej Kazimirovitsj Mejer (Moscow, 1791). Later, in Aanteekeningen (Remarks) he went one step further, elaborating on the fundamental natural law of self-preservation. To deter the superior Russians, the Turks, thus Van Woensel, were allowed to threaten biological warfare, in the form of deliberately spreading the plague.

Back in Amsterdam, he was appointed naval-physician to the Admiralty of Amsterdam. Van Woensel travelled as a ship doctor with the fleet to Surinam, Demerara and Berbice. His typically Woenselian, sometimes acrid account of local (slavery) conditions in De Lantaarn voor 1796 acquired lasting notoriety in Surinamica. In 1797, he travelled again to Russia as a secret agent, seeing the coronation of Paul I of Russia on 5 April.

In his almanac, Van Woensel wrote in favour of a divorce procedure and, an atheist himself, a healthy dose of self-reflection regarding Muslims and Jews. (Nevertheless, though feeling that the Turks, among all nations, treated Jews 'the most christianly,' he found that non-Muslims living under the Turks were ‘kept in utter abasement, [and] are basically treated like dogs.’) He states that the prime function of the state is to provide work for its inhabitants. The almanac was banned because he wrote under a pseudonym, banned since the state regulation of 1798. Apart from his work on Raynal, he also translated Thomas Paine, The decline and fall of the English system of finance into Dutch, as De daaling en val van het systhema der Engelsche finantiën (1796). In 1802, Van Woensel, a Cervantista by his own admission, published a much abridged and reworked Dutch version (based on a hitherto unknown source) of Don Quixote. With illustrations assumed to be by his own hand, and written in modern, lively Dutch, it finally replaced Lambert van den Bosch’s antiquated classic after almost 150 years. In 1804 his Rusland beschouwd (Russia considered...) was published. Van Woensel called a spade a spade and uttered his opinions on slavery and serfdom. He was critical of Russian policies carried out by Grigori Potemkin, a windbag according to Van Woensel.

== Major works ==
- De konst van waarnemen, (The art of observation), Amsterdam: Pieter Meijer, 1772.
- De tegenwoordige staat van Rusland, (The present state of Russia), Amsterdam: Albrecht Borgers, [1781]
- Vertoog over de opvoedinge van een Nederlandsch regent. Pamphlet by ‘P.V.W.M.D.’ Amsterdam: A. Borchers, 1781.
- Mémoire sur la peste. [Et cetera.] St. Petersburg: de l’Imprimerie de l’Académie Impériale des Sciences, 1788.
- Aanteekeningen, gehouden op eene reize door Turkijen, Natoliën, de Krim en Rusland, in de jaaren 1784–89, (Remarks, made on a journey through Turkey, Natolia, the Crimea, and Russia, in the years 1784-89), 2 vols., [Amsterdam: Willem Holtrop, 1791 and 1795].
- De Lantaarn, 1792-1801.
- Raadgeevingen voor de Gezondheid der Zeevaarenden (Seaman’s medical guide), bijzonder der Zulken, die of in ‘t geheel of grootendeels verstooken zijn van Genees- en Heelkundige Hulpe; ter bewaaringe der Gezondheid, en ter geneezinge der meest gewoone Ziektens en Toevallen. Beneevens een nodig Aanhangzel over de Geele Koortze, ten behoeve der geenen, die de Geneeskunst ter Zee, of in onze Buitenlandsche Bezittingen uitoefenen, 2 volumes, [Amsterdam], [1803]

== Literature ==
- Bakker, René, Reizen en de kunst van het schrijven. Pieter van Woensel in het Ottomaanse Rijk, de Krim en Rusland 1784-1789. Zeist: Christofoor, 2008.
- Broecheler, Meike (ed. and notes), Pieter van Woensel. Staat der geleerdheid in Turkijen (1791). Leiden: Astraea, 1995. (Integral text of Aanteekeningen (Remarks) vol. 1 chapter 3 (“The State of Learning in Turkey”.)
- Hanou, André (ed.; anthology), De Lantaarn. Satirische teksten uit de achttiende eeuw. Amsterdam 2002.
- Nieuwenhuis, Ivo, Onder het mom van satire. Laster, spot en ironie in Nederland, 1780–1800. Hilversum: Verloren, 2014. (Mainly on Van Woensel’s De Lantaarn series.)
- Waegemans, E. "Pieter van Woensel: een Nederlands criticaster in Russische dienst". In: Noord- en Zuid-Nederlanders in Rusland 1703-2003. Baltic Studies (2004), edited by E. Waegemans & H. van Koningsbrugge.
- Wesselo, J.J. (1969), "Pieter van Woensel. Alias Aurath-Effendi, Hekim-Bachi". In: Tirade, p. 446-71.
- Wesselo, Jan Jerphaas (anthology and notes), Pieter van Woensel. Amurath-Effendi, Hekim-Bachi. Zutphen: Thieme, [1974].
- Van Woensel, Pieter (Laban Kaptein ed.), Remarks, made on a journey through Turkey, Natolia, the Crimea and Russia, in the years 1784–89. An English translation and commentary by Laban Kaptein in three parts. Parts I and II Asch: privately published, 2015.
