= Administrative consul =

Senior official in a non-self-governing territory

An administrative consul is a type of powerful diplomat. Under certain historical circumstances, a major power's consular representation would take on various degrees of administrative roles, not unlike a colonial resident minister. This would often occur in territories without a formal state government (thus warranting a full diplomatic mission, such as an embassy).

== Protectorates ==
When a state falls under the "amical" protection of a stronger (often colonial) power, the latter is usually represented by a high ranking diplomatic and/or gubernatorial officer, such as a Resident general, Resident Minister or High Commissioner. However, if there is no such representation (in modern terms often at ambassadorial level), the task may fall to the only available "diplomatic" alternative: consular representation.

=== Africa ===
In German Kamerun, 6 July 1884 – 26 June 1885, provisional consul Heinrich Randad filled the void between the first Reichskommissar (titled—for West Africa, 5–6 July 1884 only) and the subsequent series of regular incumbents

In parts of present Nigeria, British Consuls were in charge of the following West African protectorates:

- the Bight of Benin May 1852–6 August 1861
- the Bight of Biafra 30 June 1849 – 6 August 1861
- the Bights of Biafra and Benin after the merger of the two above on 6 August 1861; the last incumbent was promoted on 5 June 1885 to stay on as first Consul general (of two) of the Bight.

=== Samoa ===
From 7 November 1889, Samoa, previously a Polynesian kingdom, was governed by the joint German-British-U.S. Samoa Tripartite Convention, which made Samoa a protectorate of those three powers. On 10 June 1899, a provisional (colonial) government sui generis was formed, consisting of the consuls of the three protecting powers:

  - Friedrich Rose (German Consul) (b. 1855–d. 1922)
  - Ernest George Berkeley Maxse (British Consul) (b. 1863–d. 1943): to 23 June 1899, succeeded by a Mister Nair (acting British consul)
  - Luther Wood Osborn (U.S. Consul) (b. 1843–d. 1901).

This arrangement lasted until 1 March 1900, when most of the archipelago was annexed by Imperial Germany. The eastern islands remained under U.S. control and became the territory of American Samoa.

=== Tonga ===
Tonga was a British protectorate from 1900 to 1970. While Tonga retained its monarchy and most local laws, a consul served as the British government's official representative. The consul was also a deputy commissioner of the Western Pacific High Commission until 1952, and was then responsible to the Governor of Fiji in his capacity as Consul-General for the Western Pacific. The consul held varying roles during the protectorate's existence, with responsibility for British subjects and other foreigners in Tonga and a de facto role as advisor to the Tongan government.

== Occupied territories under similar control ==
- In the Suez Canal Zone, even before it was officially established under that name in 1936 (from then on with a formal Governor in charge), the British were represented since 1922 by Vice Consuls in Port Suez, the last of which stayed on in 1941 as first of several Consuls till the 1956 Egyptian nationalisation.
- From December 1941 to August 1945, Japanese troops invaded the Portuguese colony of Macau several times, giving the Japanese control over the access of people and goods. This made it by 1943 a virtual protectorate, with Japanese consul Fukui Yasumitsu controlling all contact until 1945 with the Portuguese governor, Gabriel Maurício Teixeira.

Similar functions have been performed elsewhere by consular officers of other ranks: Consular Agent, Honorary Consul and Consul general.

== U.S. military personnel ==
Certain U.S. military personnel also have statutory authority to act as consuls for its military administration purposes, more broadly for its military personnel and dependents, and for its merchant seamen in a port lacking an accredited U.S. consul.

== See also ==
- Consul
- Consul (representative)
- Consul general
- Consular Agent
- Honorary Consul
