= Battle of Cádiz =

Several engagements near the port of Cádiz in Spain are known as the Battle of Cádiz:

- Raid on Cádiz (1217): town briefly occupied by Frisians during the Fifth Crusade
- Singeing the King of Spain's Beard (1587): a successful series of attack on Cádiz by English forces under Francis Drake during the Anglo-Spanish War (1585–1604).
- Capture of Cádiz (1596): the capture of Cádiz by Anglo-Dutch forces under Charles Howard, 1st Earl of Nottingham and Robert Devereux, 2nd Earl of Essex during the Anglo-Spanish War (1585–1604).
- Battle of the Gulf of Cádiz (1604): a victory of two Spanish ships under Antonio de Oquendo over two English Barbary corsairs.
- Cádiz expedition (1625): an unsuccessful attack against Cádiz by Anglo-Dutch forces under George Villiers, 1st Duke of Buckingham during the Anglo-Spanish War (1625–1630).
- Battle of Cádiz (1640): a partially successful attack by a French squadron under Jean Armand de Maillé, 2nd Marquis of Brézé against a Spanish convoy during the Franco-Spanish War (1635–1659).
- Battle of Cádiz (1656): an English victory over a Spanish treasure fleet during the Anglo-Spanish War (1654–1660).
- Battle of Cádiz (1669): an unsuccessful attempt by several Algerian ships to capture the English warship HMS Mary Rose under John Kempthorne.
- Battle of Cádiz (1702): an unsuccessful attempt by Anglo-Dutch forces under George Rooke to capture Cádiz during the War of the Spanish Succession.
- Blockade of Cádiz (1762): a British fleet's successful attempt to prevent the Spanish warships in Cádiz from sailing to Spain's colonies during the Anglo-Spanish War (1762–1763).
- Assault on Cádiz (1797): a failed assault by a British fleet under John Jervis against Cádiz during the Anglo-Spanish War (1796–1808).
- Siege of Cádiz (1810–1812): an unsuccessful attempt by French troops to capture Cádiz from a combined garrison of Spanish, British and Portuguese forces during the Peninsular War.
- Siege of Cádiz (1823): the capture of Cádiz by Spanish royalist and French forces from Spanish liberal forces during the French expedition to Spain in 1823.
- Bombardments of Cádiz (1936): several bombardments of Cádiz by the Spanish Republican Navy during the Spanish Civil War.
