= HMS Mary Rose =

Nine ships of the Royal Navy have been named Mary Rose. The first is thought to have been named after Mary Tudor, sister of King Henry VIII of England, and the rose, the symbol of the Tudor dynasty. Later Mary Roses are named after the first.

- English ship Mary Rose (1511) was a carrack launched in 1511. She was rebuilt in 1536, but sank in a battle against the French in the Solent in 1545. Part of her structure was raised in 1982 and is preserved in Portsmouth.
- English ship Mary Rose (1556) was a 39-gun galleon launched in 1556. She participated in the battles against the Spanish Armada in 1588, was rebuilt in 1589 and broken up in 1618.
- English ship Mary Rose (1623) was a 26-gun ship launched in 1623. She served in the Cádiz Expedition of 1625 and was wrecked off Flanders in 1650.
- English ship Mary Rose (1650) was a 32-gun ship, possibly a hired merchant vessel, in service between 1650 and 1654.
- HMS Mary Rose (1660) was a 40-gun fourth rate launched in 1654 as Maidstone, and renamed after the Restoration in 1660. She was commanded by John Kempthorne and is best known for the Battle of Cádiz in 1669. She was captured by the French in 1691.
- HMS Mary Rose was a 4-gun brig, previously the French tartane Maria Rose (or Marie-Rose). She was captured in 1799 off Acre and was sold in 1801.
- HMS Mary Rose (1915) was an Admiralty M-class destroyer launched in 1915 and sunk in 1917 by the German cruisers SMS Brummer and SMS Bremse.
- HMS Mary Rose (1918) was a tender purchased in 1918 and sold in 1922.
- HMS Mary Rose (J360) was an Algerine-class minesweeper launched in 1943 and broken up in 1957.

== Battle honours ==
Ships named Mary Rose have earned the following battle honours:

- Armada, 1588
- Cadiz, 1596
- Lowestoft, 1665
- Four Days' Battle, 1666
- Orfordness, 1666
- The Seven Algerines, 1669
- Sole Bay, 1672
- Schooneveld, 1673
- Texel, 1673
- Jutland, 1916
- Scandinavian Convoys, 1917

== Fiction ==
- In the 1894 novel The Captain of the Mary Rose, by William Laird Clowes, Mary Rose was a battleship (similar to the Chilean Capitán Prat) bought by the Royal Navy to replace losses after a surprise attack by the French.

== See also ==
- HMS Rose
- HMS Mary
- HMS Rosemary
