= Action of 28–29 December 1669 =

Date	28–29 December 1669
Location	Straits of Gibraltar
Result	English victory

Belligerents
England	Corsairs of Algiers

Commanders and leaders
Capt. John Kempthorn	

Strength
1 frigate, escorting a convoy of armed merchantman	7 large ships

Casualties and losses
	Heavy

On 28 December 1669, as the Mary Rose, a third-rate, carrying forty-eight guns, with a crew of 230 men, commanded by Captain John Kempthorn, was convoying a fleet of merchant ships through the Straits of Gibraltar, seven large Algerine corsairs, full of men, stood towards her. Captain Kempthorn ordered the convoy to make sail, while he, single-handed, advanced to engage the foe. The fighting continued into the following day, as the Algerines attacked the Mary Rose with much fury, and boarded her; but were beaten off with considerable loss. (Note: The above is as recorded by Campbell; but there is an original picture representing this engagement—or perhaps a later engagement involving the Kingfisher—in the Painted Hall at Greenwich, underneath which are the following lines: Two we burnt, and two we sunk, and two did run away; And one we carried to Leghorn Roads, to show we'd won the day.) The convoy reached Cádiz in safety.

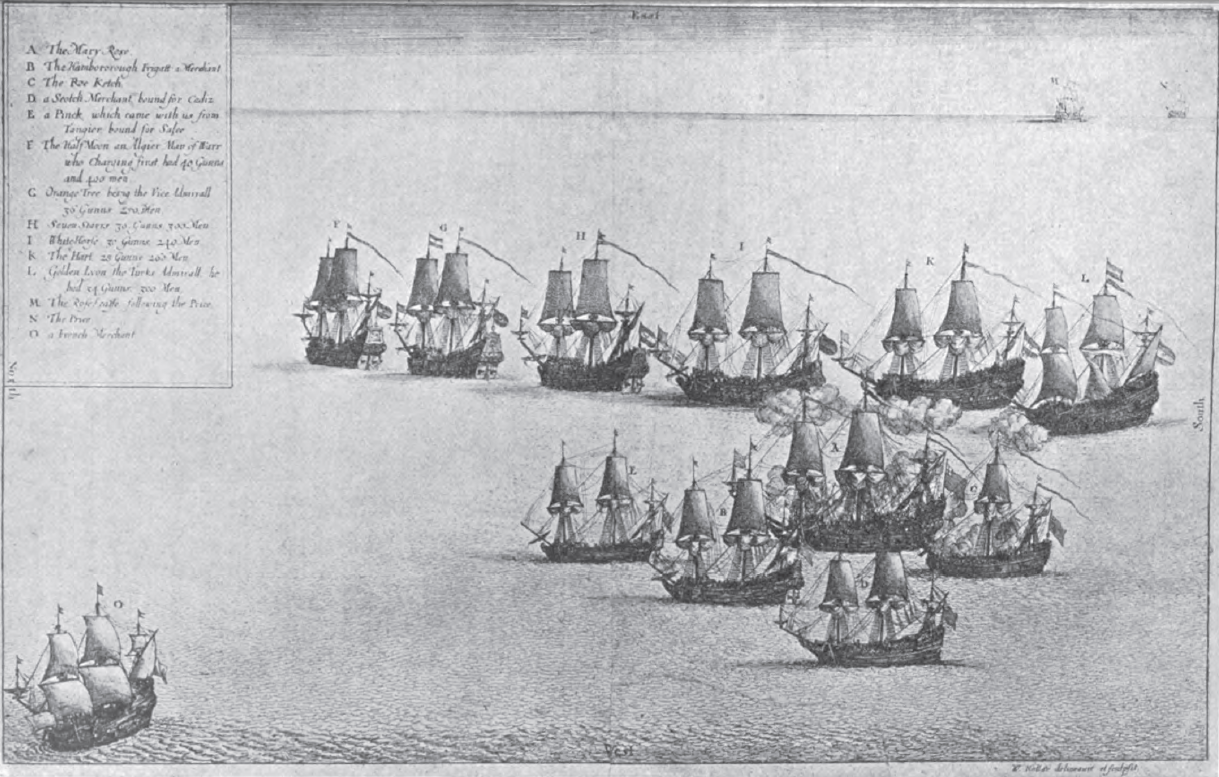
Kempthorne's engagement, engraved by Wenceslaus Hollar (John Ogilby, Description of Africa, 1670)

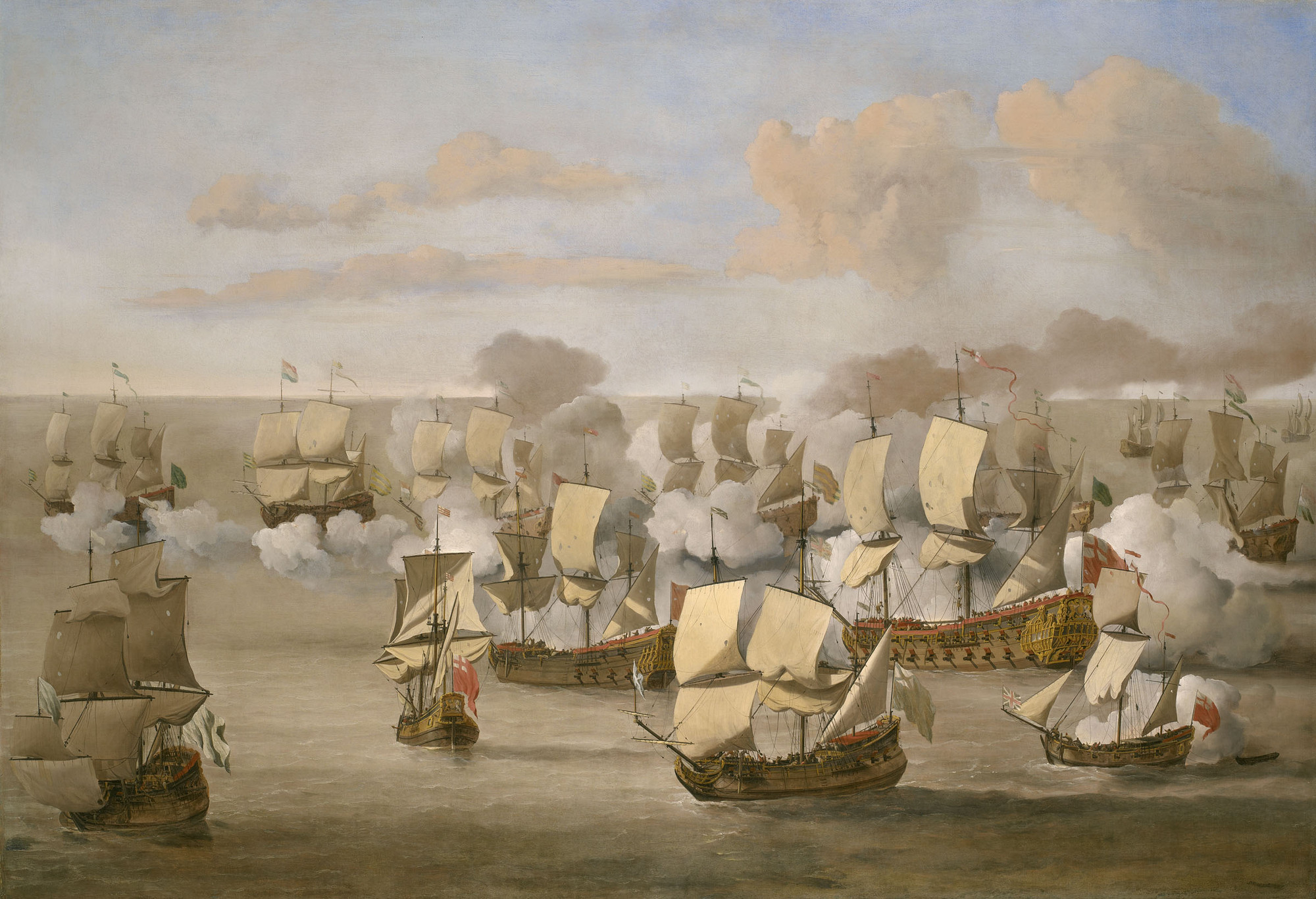
Painting of the action by Willem van de Velde the Younger, signed and dated 1676 (Royal Collection)
