= 1669 =

1669 in various calendars
- Gregorian calendar: 1669; MDCLXIX
- Ab urbe condita: 2422
- Armenian calendar: 1118; ԹՎ ՌՃԺԸ
- Assyrian calendar: 6419
- Balinese saka calendar: 1590–1591
- Bengali calendar: 1075–1076
- Berber calendar: 2619
- English Regnal year: 20 Cha. 2 – 21 Cha. 2
- Buddhist calendar: 2213
- Burmese calendar: 1031
- Byzantine calendar: 7177–7178
- Chinese calendar: 戊申年 (Earth Monkey); 4366 or 4159 — to — 己酉年 (Earth Rooster); 4367 or 4160
- Coptic calendar: 1385–1386
- Discordian calendar: 2835
- Ethiopian calendar: 1661–1662
- Hebrew calendar: 5429–5430
- Hindu calendars
- Vikram Samvat: 1725–1726
- Shaka Samvat: 1590–1591
- Kali Yuga: 4769–4770
- Holocene calendar: 11669
- Igbo calendar: 669–670
- Iranian calendar: 1047–1048
- Islamic calendar: 1079–1080
- Japanese calendar: Kanbun 9 (寛文９年)
- Javanese calendar: 1591–1592
- Julian calendar: Gregorian minus 10 days
- Korean calendar: 4002
- Minguo calendar: 243 before ROC 民前243年
- Nanakshahi calendar: 201
- Thai solar calendar: 2211–2212
- Tibetan calendar: ས་ཕོ་སྤྲེ་ལོ་ (male Earth-Monkey); 1795 or 1414 or 642 — to — ས་མོ་བྱ་ལོ་ (female Earth-Bird); 1796 or 1415 or 643

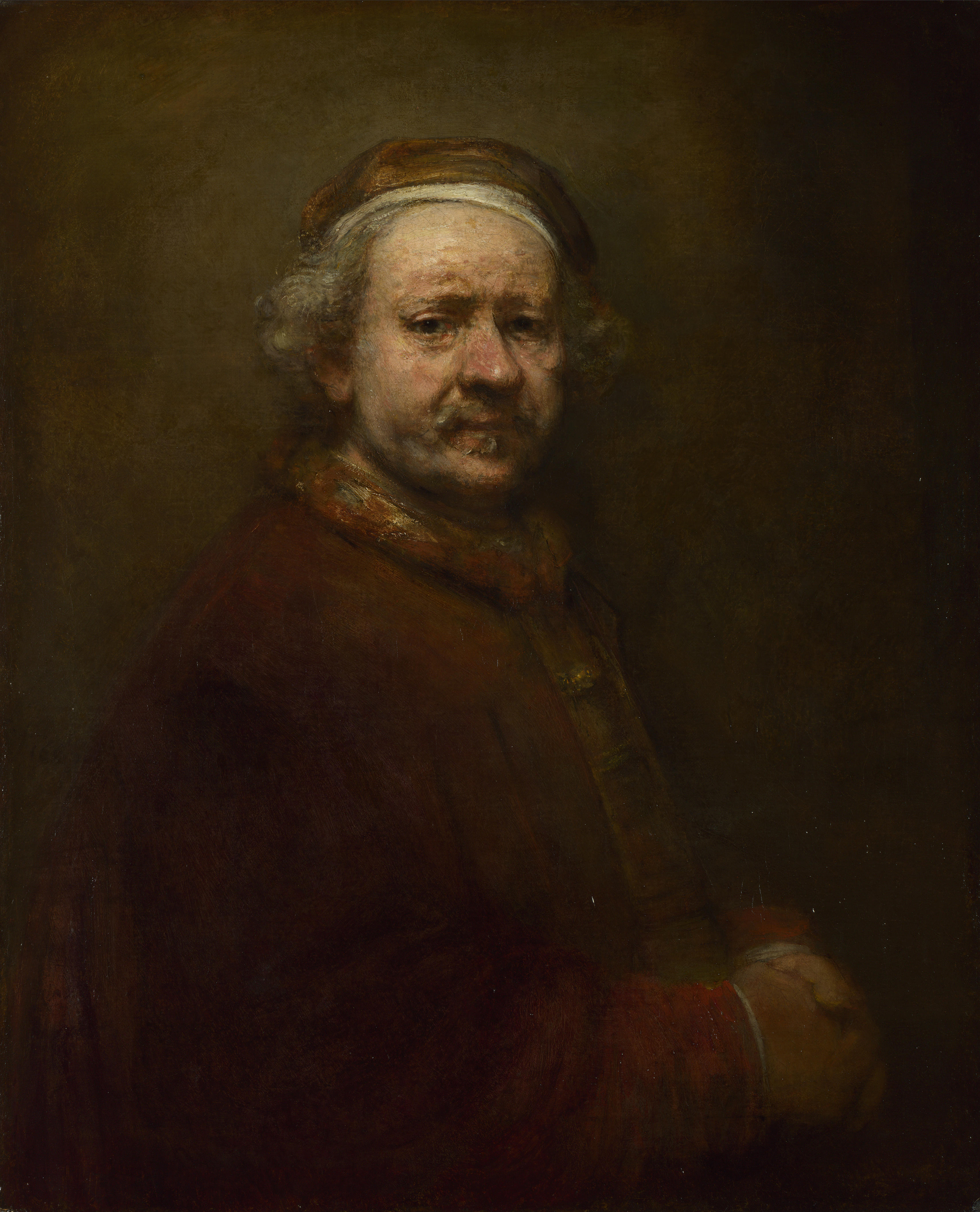
October 4: Rembrandt van Rijn dies at age 63, shortly after painting his last self-portrait

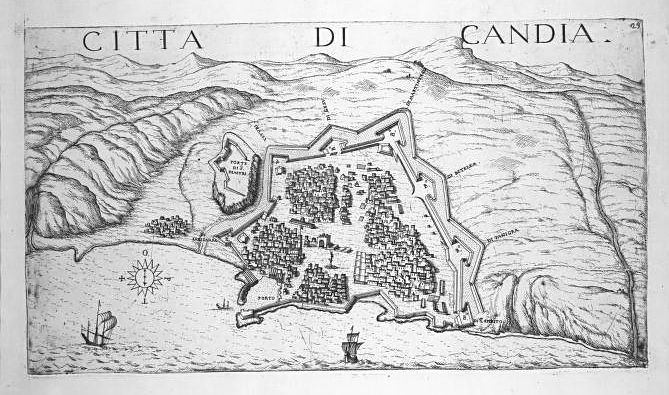
September 27: After 21 years the siege of Candia ends.

1669 (MDCLXIX) was a common year starting on Tuesday of the Gregorian calendar and a common year starting on Friday of the Julian calendar, the 1669th year of the Common Era (CE) and Anno Domini (AD) designations, the 669th year of the 2nd millennium, the 69th year of the 17th century, and the 10th and last year of the 1660s decade. As of the start of 1669, the Gregorian calendar was 10 days ahead of the Julian calendar, which remained in localized use until 1923.

== Events ==
=== January–March ===
- January 2 – Pirate Henry Morgan of Wales holds a meeting of his captains on board his ship, the former Royal Navy frigate Oxford, and an explosion in the ship's gunpowder supply kills 200 of his crew and four of the pirate captains who had attended the summit.
- January 4 – A 5.7 magnitude earthquake strikes the city of Shamakhi in Iran (now in Azerbaijan) and kills 7,000 people. Fourteen months earlier, an earthquake in Shamakhi killed 80,000 people.
- February 13 – The first performance of the Ballet de Flore, a joint collaboration of Jean-Baptiste Lully and Isaac de Benserade is given, premiering at the Palais du Louvre in Paris. King Louis XIV finances the performance and even appears in a minor role in the production as a dancer.
- February 23 – Isaac Newton writes his first description of his new invention, the reflecting telescope.
- March 11 – Mount Etna erupts, destroying the Sicilian town of Nicolosi.
- March 28 – Radu Leon is deposed by the Ottoman Sultan as Prince of Wallachia (now part of Romania and is replaced by Antonie Vodă din Popești.

=== April–June ===
- April 9 – Aurangzeb, the Muslim Emperor of the Mughal Empire in India, issues a firman decree for the protection of all Hindu temples and schools in his kingdom.
- May 1 – the Spanish Armada de Barlovento is defeated by an English Privateer fleet led by Captain Henry Morgan during his raid on Lake Maracaibo.
- May 19 – The first people executed in Sweden's Mora witch trial are put to death, with seven women and one man beheaded after being convicted of "abduction of children to Satan."
- May 31 – Samuel Pepys stops writing his diary.
- June 22 – Roux de Marsilly, accused of plotting the assassination of King Louis XIV, is publicly tortured in Paris, France.
- June 25 – François de Vendôme, Duke of Beaufort, disappears in battle, during the siege of Candia in Crete.

=== July–September ===
- July 13 – Trịnh Tạc, the warlord who administers the Kingdom of Vietnam, issues an order banning all foreign vessels from entering the harbor at Hanoi, requiring to anchor no closer than the river port at Pho Hien, 35 miles (56 km) down the Red River from Hanoi.
- July 16 – A rockfall from the Mönchsberg mountain above Salzburg in Austria kills 230 people as tons of the mountainside fall onto a neighborhood on a street, the Gstättengasse.
- July 24 – During an attempt by a fleet of French Navy ships to stop the siege of Candia by bombardment of Ottoman positions on the island of Crete, the arsenal of gunpowder on the French flagship, the 56-gun warship Thérèse, catches fire and explodes. Out of 350 crew on the Thérèse, only seven survive. Demoralized, the remaining French commanders halt the bombardment and the fleet withdraws.
- July 25 – Pieter Bickel, a Lutheran pastor and a mountaineer in Austria, becomes the first person to climb to the peak of the tallest of the Southeastern Walsertal Mountains, the 8,310 foot (2,530 m) Großer Widderstein.
- July – The Hanseatic League, after 400 years of operation, holds its last official meeting, taking place at the city of Lübeck. At its height, the economic alliance of German cities had 180 members; only nine (Lübeck, Hamburg, Bremen, Danzig, Braunschweig, Cologne, Hildesheim, Osnabrück and Rostock) are represented for the final gathering. The final series of meetings had started on May 29.
- August 17 – A group of English settlers, led by Joseph West, departs from The Downs on the ship Carolina with instructions to make the first European settlement in the modern-day U.S. state of South Carolina. After a long voyage with stops in Ireland and Barbados, the Carolina settlers arrive at Port Royal on March 17 next.
- August 24 – "The Man in the Iron Mask", a prisoner identified as "Eustache Dauger", arrives at the French fortress of Pignerol, with Bénigne Dauvergne de Saint-Mars in charge of his incarceration. The identity of the prisoner is kept secret with a mask – actually of velvet – over his face, so legends as to his true identity grow.
- August 25 – The day after the verdicts at the Mora witch trial in Sweden, 14 women and one man are publicly beheaded after having confessed to various crimes involving the use of "enchanted tools" on behalf of the Devil. Another 47 are convicted and taken away for a later execution.
- September 6 – Francesco Morosini, capitano generale of the Venetian forces in the siege of Candia, surrenders to the Ottomans.
- September 23 – Leopold I, Holy Roman Emperor grants the status and privileges of a university to the Jesuit Academy in Zagreb, the precursor to the modern University of Zagreb.
- September 29 – The formal coronation of Michał Korybut Wiśniowiecki as King of Poland (and Grand Duke of Lithuania) takes place in Kraków.

=== October–December ===
- October 4 – Dutch painter Rembrandt van Rijn dies at the age of 63, after completing his final known work Self-Portrait at the Age of 63. Despite his wealth, is buried in an unmarked grave in Amsterdam's Westerkerk. After 20 years, his remains are removed and destroyed in accordance with church custom.
- October 6 – Molière's comedy ballet Monsieur de Pourceaugnac (with music by Jean-Baptiste Lully and choreography by Pierre Beauchamp is performed for the first time, premiering at the Château of Chambord.
- October 9 – The English ship Nonsuch returns to London with the first products acquired from trade around Canada's Hudson Bay, a cargo of fine furs. The bounty from the Nonsuch expedition attracts investors for the soon-to-be-chartered Hudson's Bay Company.
- October 15 – The University of Innsbruck is chartered in Austria by Leopold I, Holy Roman Emperor. After being reduced to a lesser function on November 29, 1781, it is rechartered in 1826.
- October 19 – The Parliament of Scotland holds its first new session in six years (although two Conventions of Estates had been held briefly in 1665 and 1667). The session is opened in Edinburgh by Charles II of England in his capacity as King of Scotland.
- October 29 – Ukrainian Cossack General Mykhailo Khanenko is defeated by Petro Doroshenko at the Battle of Stebliv after attempting to wrest control of Ukraine's territory on the west side of the Dnieper River from Doroshenko.
- November 28 – In India, the Mughal Emperor Aurangzeb learns of a rebellion of Hindu residents of in various parts of the Mathurá where he had given the order for the destruction of non-Muslim temples, with rioting in Mauza' Rewarah, Chandarkah, and Surkhrú. The Emperor's historian, Saqi Mustaid Khan, records Aurangzeb's dispatch of General Hasan 'Ali Khán to attack the rebels, and 300 of them are "sent to perdition" while the Mughals lose "many imperial soldiers". Another 250 surviving rebels are arrested. Kokilá Ját, leader of the rebels, is among the prisoners put to death a month later.
- December 6 ‐ Marcus Jacobson is convicted in New Castle, Delaware after his failed revolt of the Long Swede.
- December 8 – The Sultanate of Bima, located on the now-Indonesian island of Sumbawa and ruled by Abu'l-Khair Sirajuddin, surrenders its authority to the Dutch East Indies Company, the VOC.
- December 9 – Pope Clement IX dies at the age of 69 after a reign of two and a half years.
- December 13 – Jean Racine's five-act tragic play Britannicus is performed for the first time, premiering at the Hôtel de Bourgogne in Paris. The play continues to be performed more than 350 years later, including a 2011 version translated by Dr. Howard Rubenstein.
- December 18 – The Battle of Cádiz begins off of the coast of the Spanish city as the English warship HMS Mary Rose encounters seven pirate ships from Algeria. Although none of the ships on either side are sunk, the Algerians are forced to retreat with an unknown number of casualties, and the Mary Rose loses 12 dead and 18 wounded.
- December 21 – A papal conclave that will last for four months begins in Rome to select a successor to Pope Clement IX, who had died 12 days earlier. At the opening, 54 of the 70 members of the College of Cardinals are present. At least 21 Cardinals are considered for the papacy before Emilio Altieri is selected on April 29 to become Pope Clement X.

=== Date unknown ===
- Shakushain's revolt breaks out in Hokkaido, Japan.
- Ottoman units burn the eastern part of Kolárovo.
- The Chinese Kangxi Emperor allows coastal residents deported in the Great Clearance of 1662 to return home.
- Famine in Bengal kills 3 million people.
- Phosphorus is discovered by German alchemist Hennig Brand, the first chemical element to be discovered that was not known since ancient times.
- Antonio Stradivari makes his first violin in Cremona.
- Okaya & Co. is founded as Sasaya, a trading company in Nagoya, Japan.
- The Chinese herbal medicine company Tong Ren Tang (同仁堂) is established in Beijing.
- Blaise Pascal's Pensées is posthumously published in Paris.
- Jan Swammerdam publishes his Algemeene Verhandeling van de bloedeloose dierkens, a groundbreaking work in microscopy, as well as entomology.
- The Orange College of Breda is wound up.
- Jean Picard begins measurement of 1 degree of Earth's meridian arc in France.

== Births ==
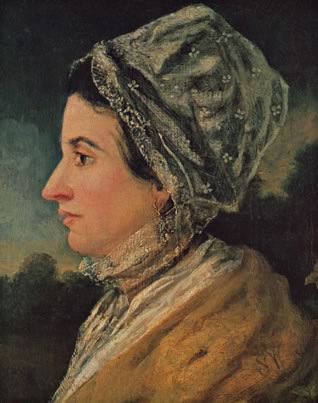
Susanna Wesley

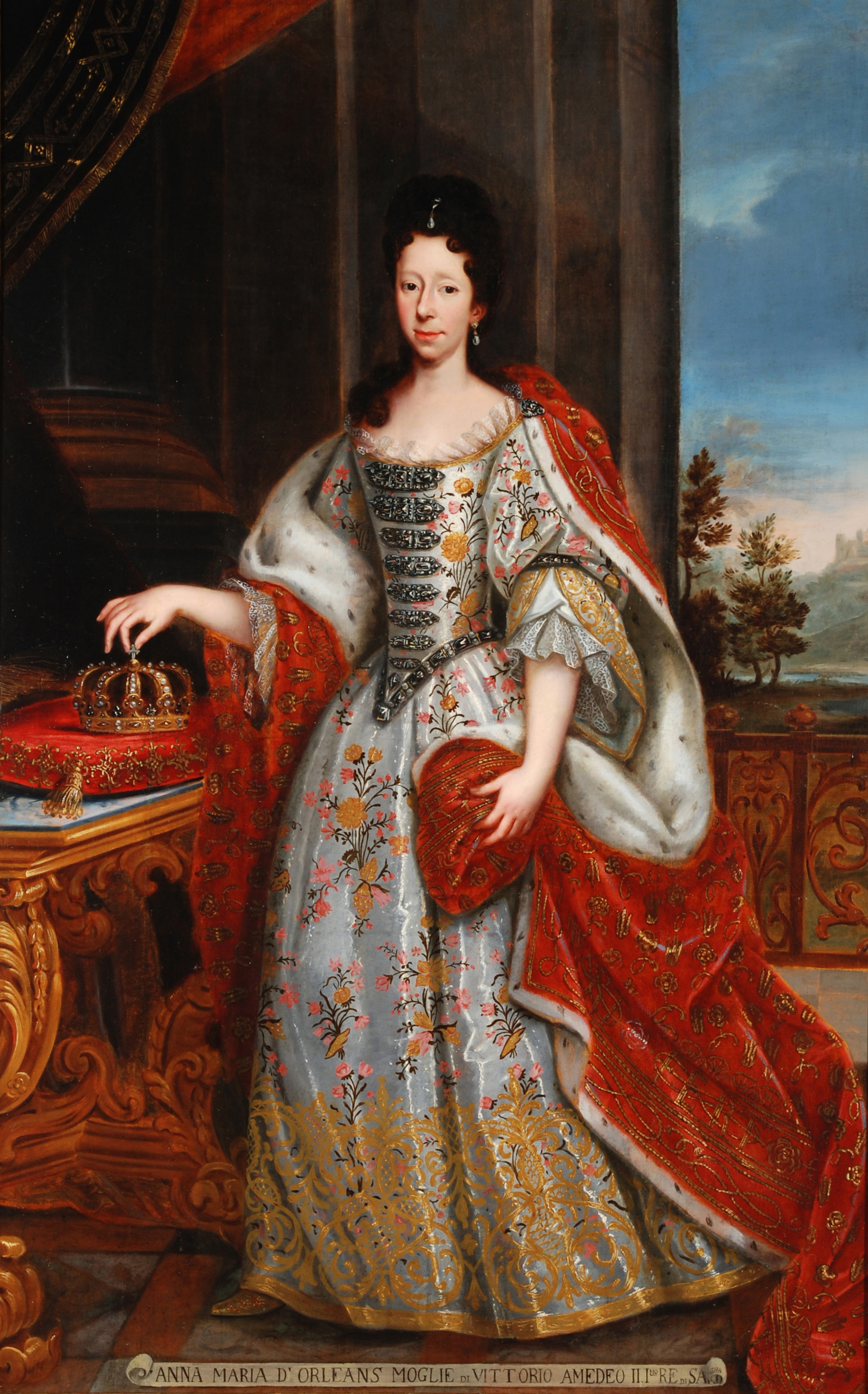
Anne Marie d'Orléans

- January 20 – Susanna Wesley, mother of the John and Charles Wesley, known as mother of Methodism (d. 1742)
- April 3 – Jean-Baptiste Forqueray, French musician (d. 1722)
- May 24 – Emerentia von Düben, Swedish royal favorite (d. 1743)
- May 26 – Sébastien Vaillant, French botanist (d. 1722)
- July 30 – Eudoxia Lopukhina, first wife of Peter the Great of Russia (d. 1731)
- August 27 – Anne Marie d'Orléans, Queen of Sicily and Sardinia (d. 1728)
- August 29 – John Anstis, English herald (d. 1744)
- October 19 – Count Wirich Philipp von Daun, Austrian military leader (d. 1741)
- December 16 – Arnold Boonen, Dutch portrait painter (d. 1729)
- date unknown
  - Alessio Erardi, Maltese painter (d. 1727)
  - Jiang Tingxi, Chinese painter (d. 1732)
  - Elżbieta Sieniawska, politically influential Polish magnate (d. 1729)
- probable – Peter King, 1st Baron King, Lord Chancellor of England (d. 1734)

== Deaths ==
Rembrandt

- January 27 – Gaspar de Crayer, Flemish painter (b. 1584)
- February 3 – Catharina Questiers, Dutch poet (b. 1631)
- February 13 – Peter Venables, English politician (b. 1604)
- February 23 – Lieuwe van Aitzema, Dutch historian and statesman (b. 1600)
- March 10 – John Denham, English poet (b. 1615)
- March 12 – Cornelis Jan Witsen, Mayor of Amsterdam (b. 1605)
- March 17 – Willem van der Zaan, Dutch admiral (b. 1621)
- March 23 – Philipp Buchner, German composer (b. 1614)
- March 25 – Sir Lionel Tollemache, 3rd Baronet, English baronet (b. 1624)
- April 4 – Johann Michael Moscherosch, German statesman, satirist (b. 1601)
- April 5 – Nabeshima Naozumi, Japanese daimyō (b. 1616)
- April 12 – Abdias Treu, German mathematician and academic (b. 1597)
- April 22 – Friedrich Wilhelm II, Duke of Saxe-Altenburg (1639–1669) (b. 1603)
- April 23 – Johannes Canuti Lenaeus, archbishop of Uppsala, Sweden (b. 1573)
- April 27 – Richard Treat, American city founder (b. 1584)
- May 1 – Isaac Thornton, English politician (b. 1615)
- May 14 – Georges de Scudéry, French writer (b. 1601)
- May 16 – Pietro da Cortona, Italian artist (b. 1596)
- June 25 – François de Vendôme, Duke of Beaufort, French soldier (b. 1616)
- July 16 – Thomas Howard, 1st Earl of Berkshire, English politician (b. 1587)
- July 29 – Josias II, Count of Waldeck-Wildungen, major general in Brunswick and co-ruler of Waldeck-Wildungen (b. 1636)
- August 18 – William Gawdy, English politician (b. 1612)
- August 28 – Sir William Drake, 1st Baronet, English politician (b. 1606)
- September 3 – Esteban Manuel de Villegas, Spanish poet (b. 1589)
- September 10 – Henrietta Maria of France, queen of England, Scotland and Ireland (b. 1609)
- September 28 – Pierre Le Muet, French architect (b. 1591)
- October 4 – Rembrandt Harmenszoon van Rijn, Dutch painter (b. 1606)
- October 9 – Richard Strode, English politician (b. 1584)
- October 14 – Antonio Cesti, Italian composer (b. 1623)
- October 16 – John Trapp, English theologian (b. 1601)
- October 19
  - Domenico Fiasella, Italian painter (b. 1589)
- October 24 – William Prynne, English Puritan leader (b. 1600)
- November 3 – Charles Drelincourt, French Protestant divine (b. 1595)
- November 4 – Johannes Cocceius, Dutch theologian (b. 1603)
- November 7 – Lebrecht, Prince of Anhalt-Köthen, German prince of the House of Ascania (b. 1622)
- November 10 – Elisabeth Pepys, English wife of Samuel Pepys (b. 1640)
- December 9 – Pope Clement IX (b. 1600)
- December 11 – Anna Maria of Mecklenburg-Schwerin, consort of Augustus, Duke of Saxe-Weissenfels (b. 1627)
- December 13 – Thomas Dyke, English politician (b. 1619)
- December 16 – Nathaniel Fiennes, English politician (b. c. 1608)
- December 18 – Johann Philipp of Hanau-Lichtenberg, German nobleman (b. 1626)
- December 25 – George William, Count Palatine of Zweibrücken-Birkenfeld (b. 1591)
- December 31 – Bogusław Radziwiłł, Polish-Lithuanian noble (b. 1620)
