= HMS Princess Mary =

Three ships of the Royal Navy have borne the name HMS Princess Mary or HMS Princess Maria:

- HMS Princess Maria (1652) was a 38-gun ship captured in 1652 and wrecked in 1658.
- HMS Princess Mary (1688) was a yacht built in 1688. She was sold at some point, becoming a merchant ship. She remained in service until 1827 under the name Betty Cairns.
- HMS Princess Mary was a 60-gun fourth rate launched in 1704 as HMS Mary. She was relaunched in 1742 as HMS Princess Mary, and was sold in 1766.
- HMS Princess Mary II was a minesweeper lost to a mine in the Aegean on 8 February 1919.

== See also ==
- HMS Princess
- HMS Mary
