= HMS Mary =

Fifteen ships of the Royal Navy have borne the name HMS Mary:

- English ship Mary (1350) was a Cinque Ports ship in service in 1350.
- English ship Mary (1400) was a ship in service from 1400 and given away in 1423.
- English ship Mary (1413) was a ship in service from 1413 and lost in 1426.
- English ship Mary (1648) was a Royalist ketch in 1648. She was captured by the Parliamentarians in 1649 and not listed thereafter.
- HMS Mary (1660), launched as Speaker in 1650 and renamed in 1660 on the restoration she was a 50-gun frigate, rebuilt in 1688, and wrecked in 1703, that was the prototype for the Speaker-class
- HMS Mary (1666) was a 4-gun fireship purchased in 1666 and sold in 1667.
- HMS Mary (1667) was a 4-gun fireship purchased in 1667 and expended that year.
- HMS Mary (1677) was an 8-gun yacht launched in 1677. She was rebuilt in 1727 and 1761 and was broken up in 1816.
- HMS Mary (1688) was a 60-gun ship of the line built at Woolwich
- HMS Mary (1694) was a 10-gun ketch of unknown origin that foundered in 1694.
- HMS Mary (1702) was a 4-gun smack launched in 1702. She was rebuilt in 1728 and lost in 1778.
- HMS Mary (1704) was a 60-gun fourth-rate ship of the line launched in 1704, rebuilt in 1742 and renamed HMS Princess Mary, and sold in 1766.
- HMS Mary (1794) was a gunvessel purchased in 1794 and sold in 1798.
- HMS Mary (1797 tender) was a 6-gun tender purchased in 1797 and listed until 1805.
- HMS Mary (1797 brig) was a 10-gun brig, the captured French Marie, renamed HMS Halifax in 1800 and sold in 1802.
- HMS Mary (1812) was a 3-gun schooner listed in 1812 and captured by the Americans in 1813.
- HMS Mary (1867) was a Coastguard cutter launched in 1867 and sold in 1905.

== Ships that have used Mary in their names ==
- HMS Mary and John was a ship purchased in 1487, rebuilt in 1512 and listed until 1528.
- HMS Mary Ann was a 4-gun bomb vessel purchased in 1694 and sold in 1698.
- HMS Mary Antrim was a 14-gun Irish Royalist ship captured in 1644 by the Parliamentarians and renamed Tiger’s Whelp in 1649, after which she was lost.
- HMS Mary Breton was a ship captured from the French in 1415 but recaptured by them in 1421.
- HMS Mary Flyboat was a ship captured in 1650 and sold in 1657.
- HMS Mary Fortune was a ship launched in 1497 and rebuilt in 1512 when she was renamed HMS Swallow. She is listed until 1527.
- HMS Mary Galley was the name of two ships.
- HMS Mary George was a ship purchased in 1512 and listed until 1526.
- HMS Mary Gloria was a ship purchased in 1517 and listed until 1522.
- HMS Mary Grace was the name of three ships.
- HMS Mary Guildford was a ship listed between 1524 and 1539.
- HMS Mary Hamboro was a 70-gun ship purchased in 1544 and sold in 1555.
- HMS Mary Hampton was a carrack captured from the Genoese in 1416. She foundered in 1420.
- HMS Mary Imperial was a ship listed between 1513 and 1525.
- HMS Mary James was the name of two ships.
- HMS Mary Norwell was a ship listed in 1549.
- HMS Mary Odierne was a ship captured in 1545. Her fate is unknown.
- HMS Maryport was to have been a Hunt-class minesweeper, but she was renamed HMS Mistley before her launch in 1918.
- HMS Mary Prize was the name of three ships.
- HMS Mary Rose was the name of nine ships, the first being the Tudor warship Mary Rose, now preserved at Portsmouth.
- HMS Mary of Rouen was a ship captured in 1626 and listed until 1627.
- HMS Mary Thomas was a ship captured in 1545 and listed until 1546.
- HMS Maryton was a Ton-class coastal minesweeper launched in 1958 and sold for scrapping in 1969.
- English ship Mary Willoughby was a ship listed in 1535. She was captured by the Scots in 1536, but recaptured in 1547. She was rebuilt in 1551 and sold in 1573.

== See also ==
- HMY Mary was an 8-gun royal yacht presented by the Dutch in 1660 and wrecked in 1675.
- HMS Princess Mary
- HMS Queen Mary
- Royal Mary, of the Royal Scots Navy, launched in 1696, transferred to the Royal Navy at the Union in 1707, when she was renamed HMS Glasgow (1707), and sold in 1719
- His Majesty's Revenue cutter Mary. On 25 July 1797 she captured a small French privateer chasse maree off Ballycotton. The privateer was the Acheron, of 28 tons, out of Morlaix. Acheron was armed with one 8-pounder carronade and had a crew of 40 men. She had just arrived off Ballycotton but had already taken three vessels, which however the British had all recaptured. The Revenue brig Beresford arrived just as Mary took Acheron.
- HMAS Maryborough was a Bathurst-class corvette launched in 1940 and lent to the Royal Australian Navy in 1941. She was sold into civilian service in 1947 and was renamed Isobel Queen.
- HMS Mary Rose
- HMS Rosemary
