= Mary James =

Mary James may refer to:

- Mary James (educator) (born 1946), Associate Director of Research at the University of Cambridge
- Mary James (scientist), American physicist
- Mary James Gill (born 1985), Pakistani politician
- Mary-Dulany James (born 1960), U.S. politician in Maryland
- Mary Dagworthy James (1810–1883), American hymn writer (also went by Mary Yard James)
- Mary James, a pen name for Marijane Meaker (1927–2022), American author who wrote books for young children
- HMS Mary James, two ships of the Royal Navy have borne the name HMS Mary James
