= Wenceslaus Hollar =

Czech engraver, etcher and painter (1607–1677)

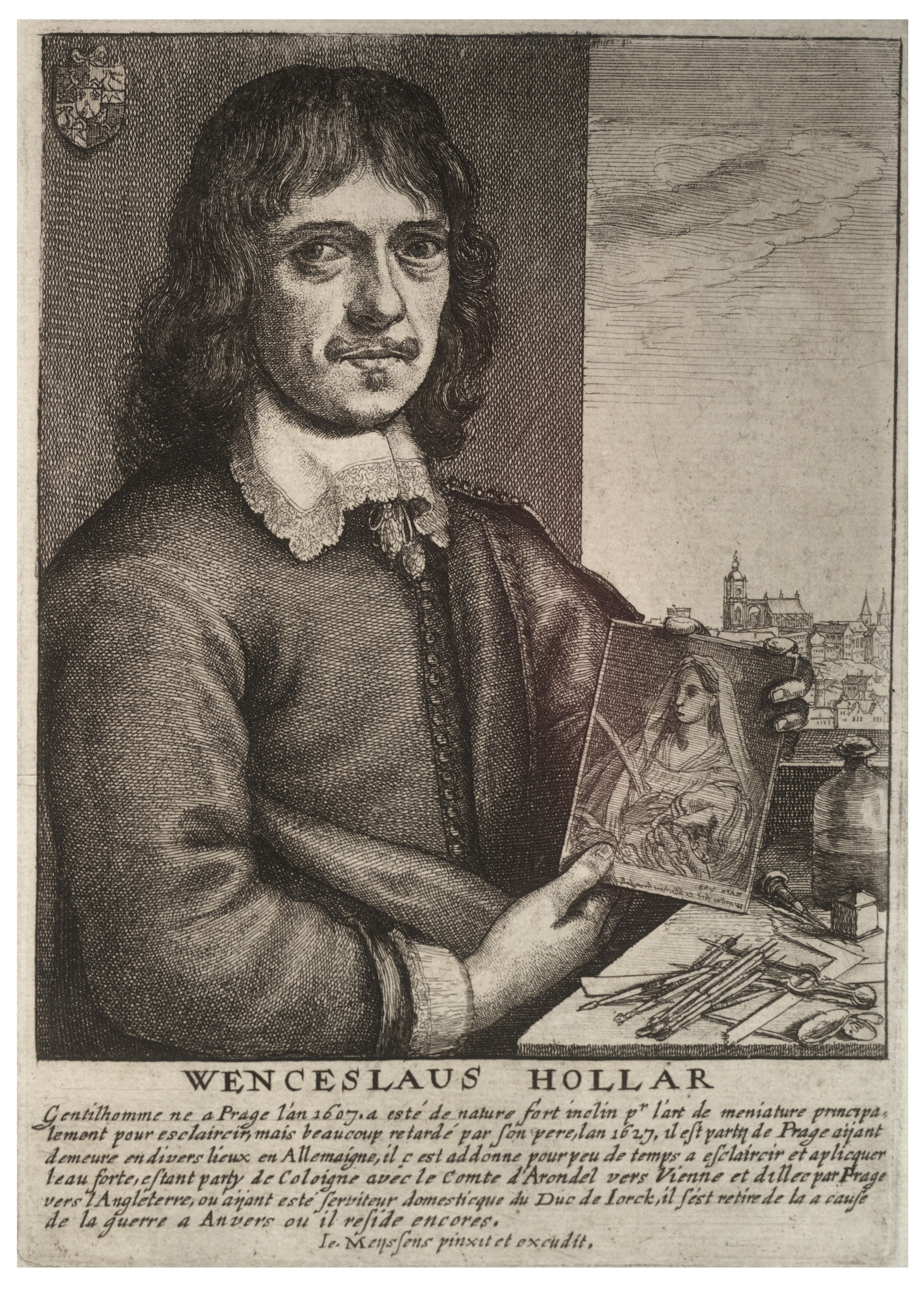
- Portrait etched by Hollar after an original by Jan Meyssens, c. 1649. Prague Castle is in the background.
- Born: Václav Hollar; 13 July 1607; Prague, Kingdom of Bohemia, Holy Roman Empire
- Died: 25 March 1677 (aged 69); London, Kingdom of England
- Known for: Etching
- Movement: Baroque

Wenceslaus Hollar (Czech: Václav Hollar (Czech pronunciation: [ˈvaːtslaf ˈɦolar]), German: Wenzel Hollar; 13 July 1607 – 25 March 1677) was a Czech engraver, etcher and painter. He spent much of his life in England. He often created cityscapes and landscapes, including vedutas. He was born in Prague, died in London, and was buried at St Margaret's Church, Westminster.

== Early life ==
Václav Hollar was born on 13 July 1607 in Prague, Bohemia. After his family was financially ruined by the Sack of Prague in the Thirty Years' War, the young Hollar, who had been destined for the legal profession, decided to become an artist. The earliest of his works that have come down to us are dated 1625 and 1626; they are small plates, and one of them is a copy of a "Virgin and Child" by Dürer, whose influence upon Hollar's work was always great. In 1627 he was in Frankfurt where he was apprenticed to the renowned engraver Matthäus Merian. In 1630 he lived in Strasbourg, Mainz and Koblenz, where he portrayed the towns, castles, and landscapes of the Middle Rhine Valley. In 1633 he moved to Cologne.

It was in 1636 that he attracted the notice of the famous nobleman and art collector Thomas Howard, 21st Earl of Arundel, then on a diplomatic mission to the imperial court of Emperor Ferdinand II. Employed as a draftsman, he travelled with Arundel to Vienna and Prague. In Cologne in 1635, Hollar published his first book. In 1637 he went with Arundel to England, where he remained in the earl's household for many years.

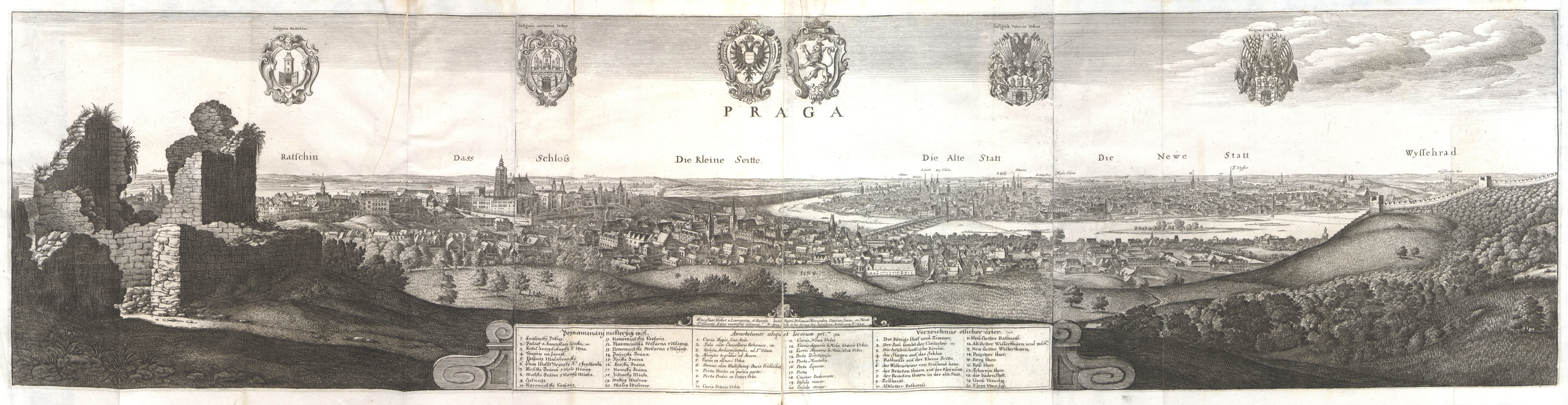
Panorama of Prague in 1636 (issued in 1649)

== Life in England ==
Allegory on the Death of the Earl of Arundel

Though he remained an artist in service of Lord Arundel, he seems not to have worked exclusively for him, and after the earl's death in Padua in 1646, Hollar earned his living by working for various authors and publishers, which was afterwards his primary means of distribution. After Lord Arundel's death in 1646, probably at the request of Hendrik van der Borcht, he etched a commemorative print done after a design by Cornelius Schut in Arundel's honour, dedicated to his widow Aletheia. Arundel is seated in melancholy mode on his tomb in front of an obelisk (perhaps commemorating the obelisk of Domitian which he tried to import from Rome), and surrounded by works of art and their personifications.

In 1745, George Vertue paid homage to their association in the vignette he published on page one of his Description of the Works of the Ingenious Delineator and Engraver Wenceslaus Hollar. It featured a bust of Arundel in front of a pyramid, symbolizing immortality, surrounded by illustrated books and the instruments of Hollar's trade.

During his first year in England he created "View of Greenwich", later issued by Peter Stent, the print-seller. Nearly 3 feet (0.9 m) long, he received thirty shillings for the plate, a small fraction of its present value. Afterwards he fixed the price of his work at fourpence an hour, and measured his time by a sand-glass. On 4 July 1641 Hollar married a lady-in-waiting to the Countess of Norfolk. Her name was Tracy; they had two children. Arundel had left England by 1642, and Hollar passed into the service of the Duke of York, taking with him his young family.

=== English Civil War ===
Hollar continued to produce works prolifically throughout the English Civil War, but it adversely affected his income. With other royalist artists, notably Inigo Jones and William Faithorne the engraver, he stood the long and eventful siege of Basing House, and as there were some hundred plates from his hand dated during the years 1643 and 1644 he must have turned his enforced leisure to good purpose. An etching dated 1643 and entitled civilis seditio epitomizes the war with a snake with a head at each end pulling in opposite directions in front of the Giza pyramids and sphinx. Hollar took his setting, presumably symbolizing longer term values, directly from an engraving published in George Sandys' Relation of a Journey begun An. Dom 1610.

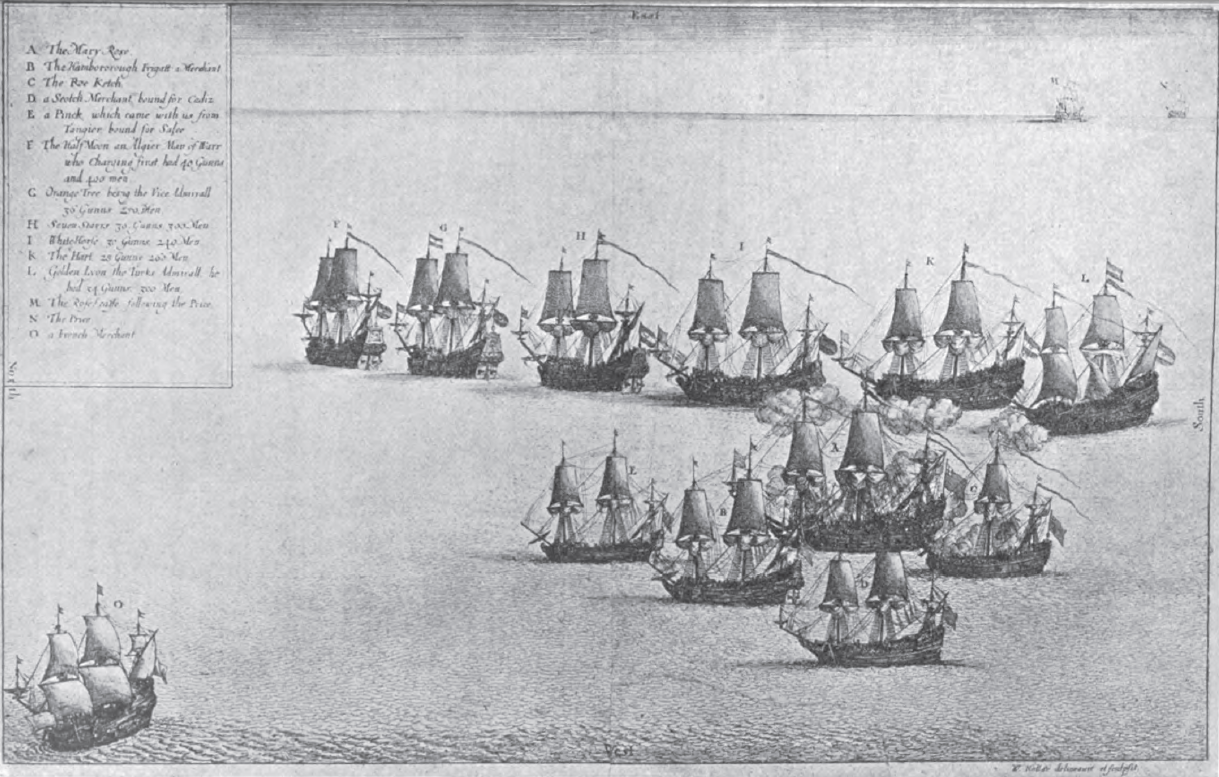
Hollar's depiction of the Mary Rose engagement

Hollar joined the Royalist Regiment and was captured by parliamentary forces in 1645 during the siege of Basing House. After a short time he managed to escape. In Antwerp in 1646, he again met with the Earl of Arundel. During this period of the unrest of the Civil Wars, he worked in Antwerp, where he produced many of his most renowned works, including Dutch cityscapes, seascapes, depictions of nature, his "muffs" and "shells". In 1652 he returned to London, and lived for a time with Faithorne near Temple Bar. In 1654 he produced a map of the River Tyne.

In the following years, many books were published which he illustrated: Ogilby's Virgil and Homer, Stapylton's Juvenal, and Dugdale's Warwickshire, St Paul's and Monasticon (part one). However, his work for the booksellers was poorly paid, and Hollar's commissions declined as the Court no longer purchased his works after the Restoration. During this time he also lost his young son, who was reputed to have artistic ability, to the plague.

After the Great Fire of London he produced some of his famous "Views of London"; and it may have been the success of these plates and other cityscapes such as his 1649 Great View of Prague which induced the king to send him, in 1668, to Tangier, to draw the town and forts. During his return to England a desperate and successful engagement was fought by his ship, the Mary Rose, under Captain John Kempthorne, against seven Algerian men-of-war; a battle which Hollar etched for Ogilby's Africa, published in 1670.

He lived eight years after his return, still producing illustrations for booksellers, and continuing to produce well-regarded works until his death, for example a large plate of Edinburgh dated 1670. He died in extreme poverty, his last recorded words being a request to the bailiffs that they would not carry away the bed on which he was dying. Hollar was laid to rest in a tomb in the supplementary burial ground for St Margaret's, which was also the site of the New Chapel.

Long View of London from Bankside, 1647

== Works ==
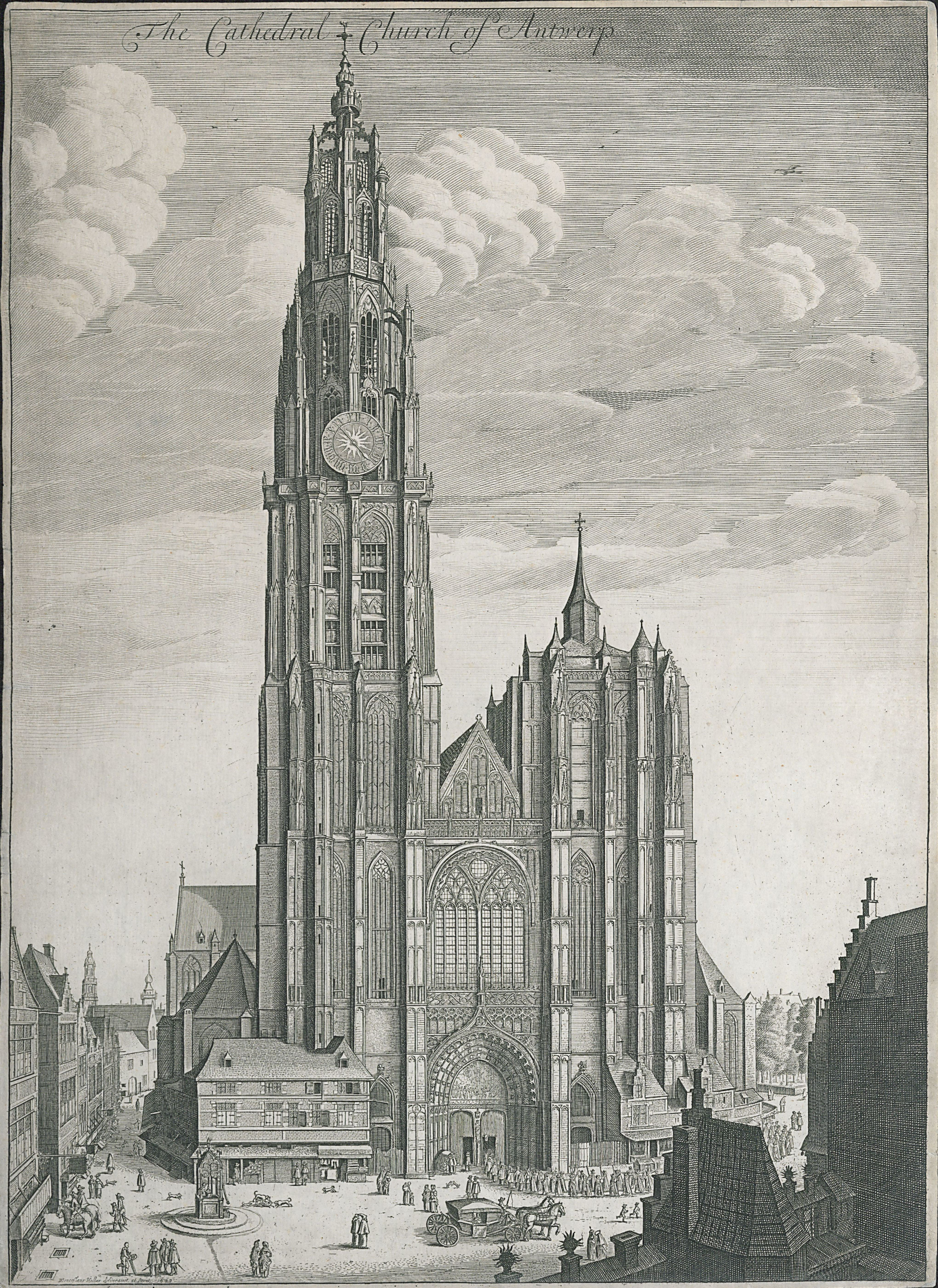
Cathedral of Our Lady of Antwerp

Hollar was one of the most prolific artists of his time. His work includes some 400 drawings and 3000 etchings. Hollar produced a variety of works. His plates number some 2740, and include views, portraits, ships, religious subjects, heraldic subjects, landscapes, and still life in many different forms. Examples of the complexity and scale of his projects include the eight-plate Portuguese Genealogy and 12-plate series of insects published as Muscarum Scarabeorum Vermiumque varie figure. His architectural drawings, such as those of Antwerp and Strasbourg cathedrals, and his views of towns, are to scale, but are intended as pictures as well. He reproduced decorative works of other artists, as in the famous chalice after Mantegna's drawing.

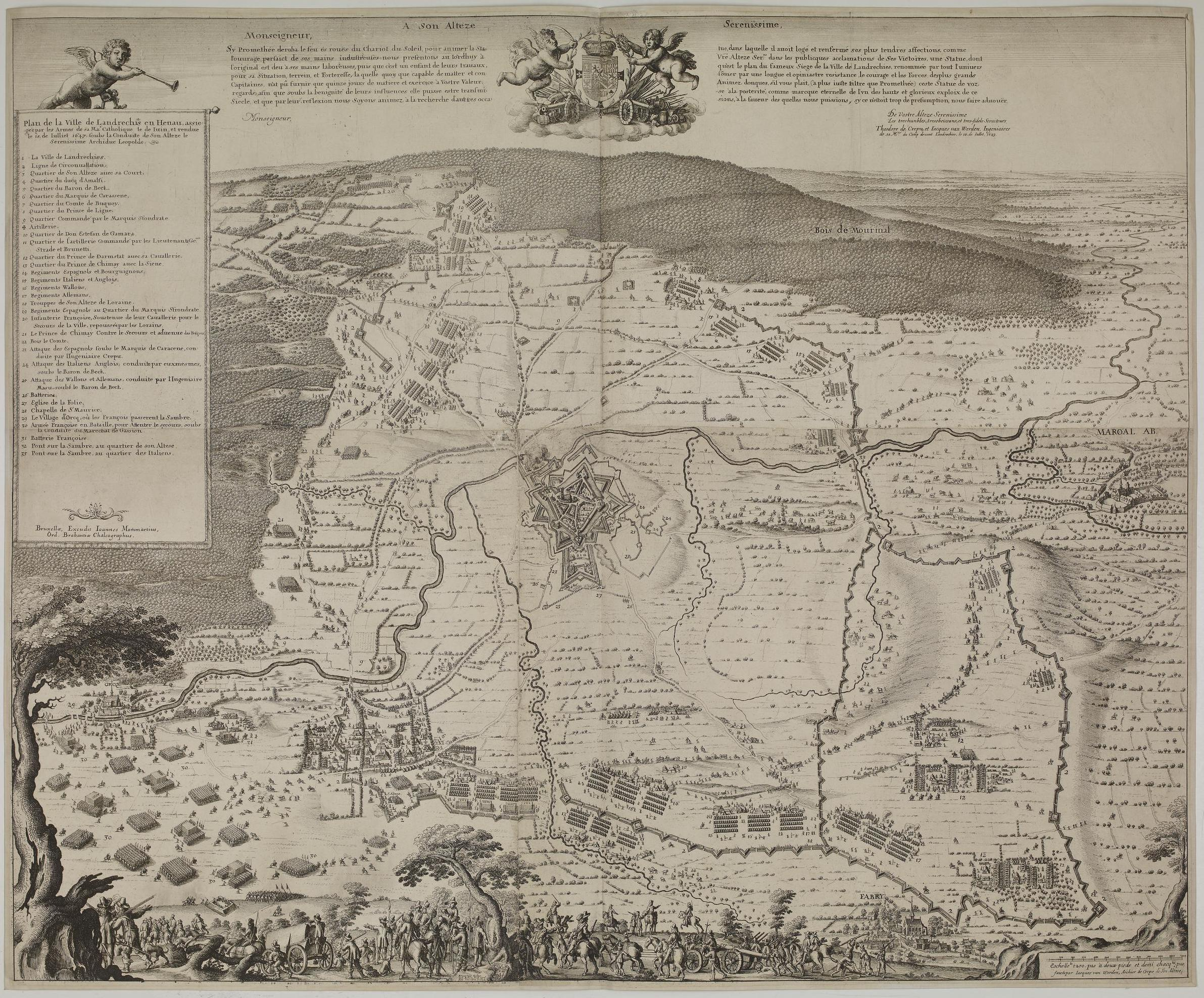
Siege of Landrecies

One of Hollar's most famous etchings is a picture of the Cathedral of Our Lady of Antwerp, dated 1649. The work's lively figural decoration, typical of Hollar's style, includes a procession towards the entrance of the cathedral, a horse-drawn coach, and passers-by and dogs in a square in front of the church. The picture of the Antwerp cathedral was on display in 2013 at the Lobkowicz Palace during the Lobkowicz Library exhibition "Architecture in the Work of Peter Paul Rubens and Vaclav Hollar".

Hollar was known for his topographical works and his maps. These were often made after designs by other artists. He made a few maps of military engagements which were drawn by the Flemish artist and cartographer Jacob van Werden. An example is the Siege of Landrecies dated 1648, which is an etching on four plates on four conjoined sheets of paper. It comprises a plan of the city of Landrecies, with the Bois de Mourinal in the upper right, while it is under siege by Archduke Leopold Wilhelm of Austria in 1647. Some of the Duke's troops are shown under a tree in the foreground, with carts and guns. The print also offers a schematic view of the various regiments and forces under several commanders and their positions around the city. In the left foreground the French army can be seen approaching to attack the Archduke's forces.

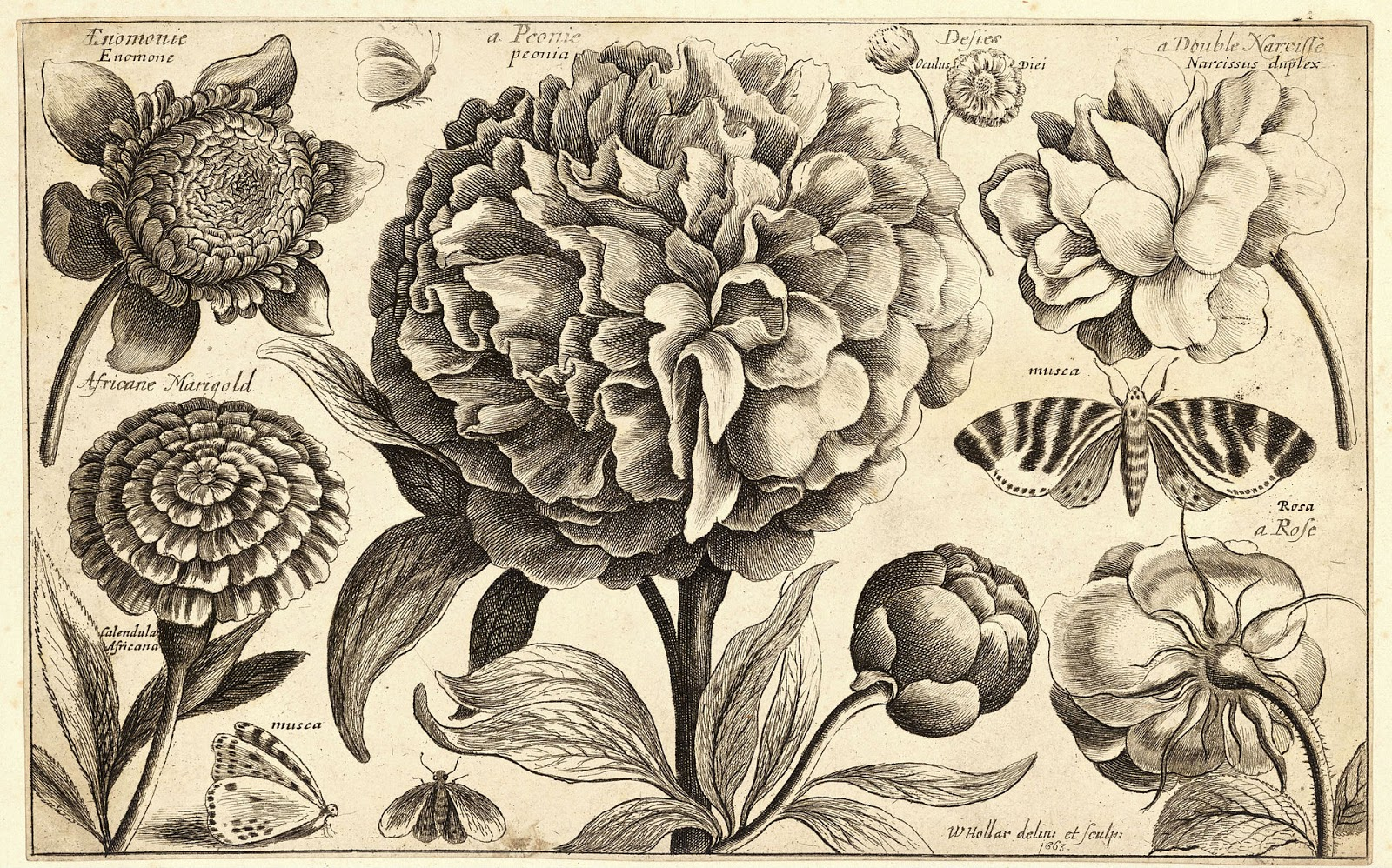
Peony engraving

Collections of Hollar's work are kept in the British Museum in London, the print room at Windsor Castle, the Fisher Library at the University of Toronto, the National Gallery in Prague, and the Virginia Museum of Fine Arts Frank W. Raysor Collection.

Hollar's works were first catalogued in 1745 by George Vertue, with a second edition in 1759. The prints were subsequently catalogued in 1853 by Gustav Parthey and in 1982 by Richard Pennington. A new complete illustrated catalogue has been published in the New Hollstein German series. Much of Hollar's work is available online from the University of Toronto in its Wenceslaus Hollar digital collection. The Folger Shakespeare Library also holds some 2000 prints, drawings, and other works by Hollar.

A very rare original copper plate produced by Hollar has survived, an engraving of the city of Kingston upon Hull in Yorkshire, and is held in the British Library.

Hollar engraved a costume book entitled Livre curieux contenant la naifve representation des habits des femmes des diverses parties du monde comme elles s'habillent a present (Entertaining book containing the simple depiction of the clothes of women from different parts of the world as they dress now) The book includes a series of 28 plates representing the attire of common women, mostly from European countries, from the 17th century. The book was published in 1662 in Paris by Baltazar Moncornet.

== Legacy ==
The Výtvarná škola Václava Hollara (Wenceslaus Hollar Secondary School of Art), a High School of Arts and Higher Art School in Prague, is named after him.
