= Great View of Prague =

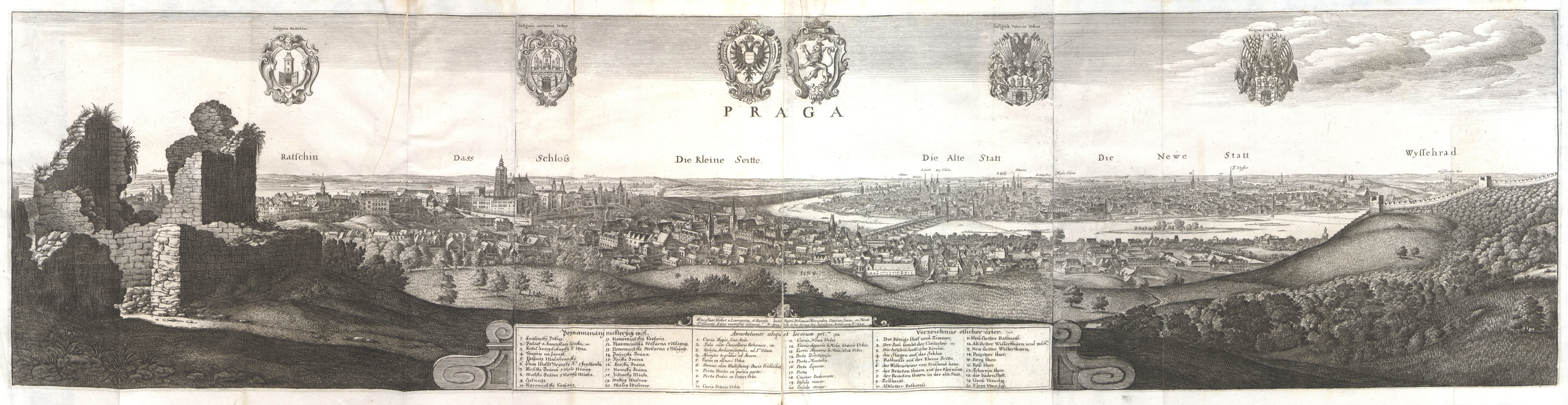
- Year: 1649
- Type: etching on paper
- Dimensions: 28 cm × 113.5 cm (11 in × 44.7 in)

Large View of Prague from Petrin is an etching by Vaclav Hollar consisting of three sheets (collectively which have dimensions of 28 x 113.5 cm).

== Description ==
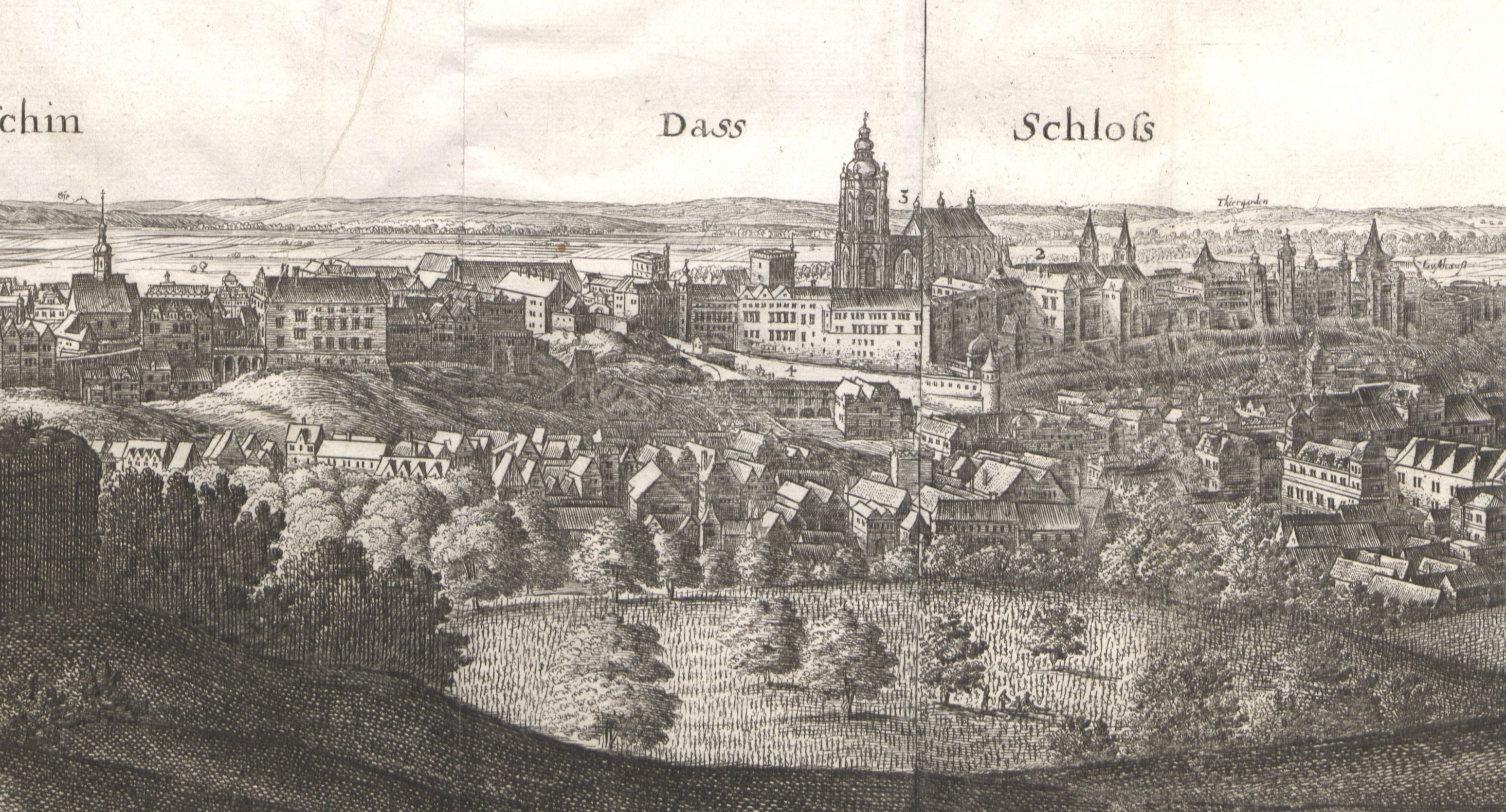
Detail, Das Schloss, the castle district

In the Hollar catalog prints placed under number P880 (a-c). The etching was published in Antwerp in 1649 and was inserted into Topographia Bohemiae, Moraviae et Silesiae (Topographia Germaniae), published 1650. He left shortly after to create another perspective, his great view of London in 1647. On the middle sheet is a legend with a signature where Hollar says that the etching was based on drawings, taken in 1636. In 1636 with his new patron, Thomas Howard, he returned briefly from German lands to Prague and then went to England. It is believed that the artwork is preserved and is now in the possession of the National Gallery in Prague.

The view is captured from a vantage point on Petrin (Mount St. Lawrence) and Prague is captured from Hradcany after Vysehrad, left, which form the framework of a ruin (with a view of Strahov), then right wall. Of Prague (Prague Castle, Lesser Town, Old Town and New Town) are described above them are urban captions (in the middle of the sheet is still German and Czech characters). In addition, there are some important places (buildings) described with twenty locations marked with numbers and described in the legend (descriptions are Czech, Latin and German).

== Importance ==
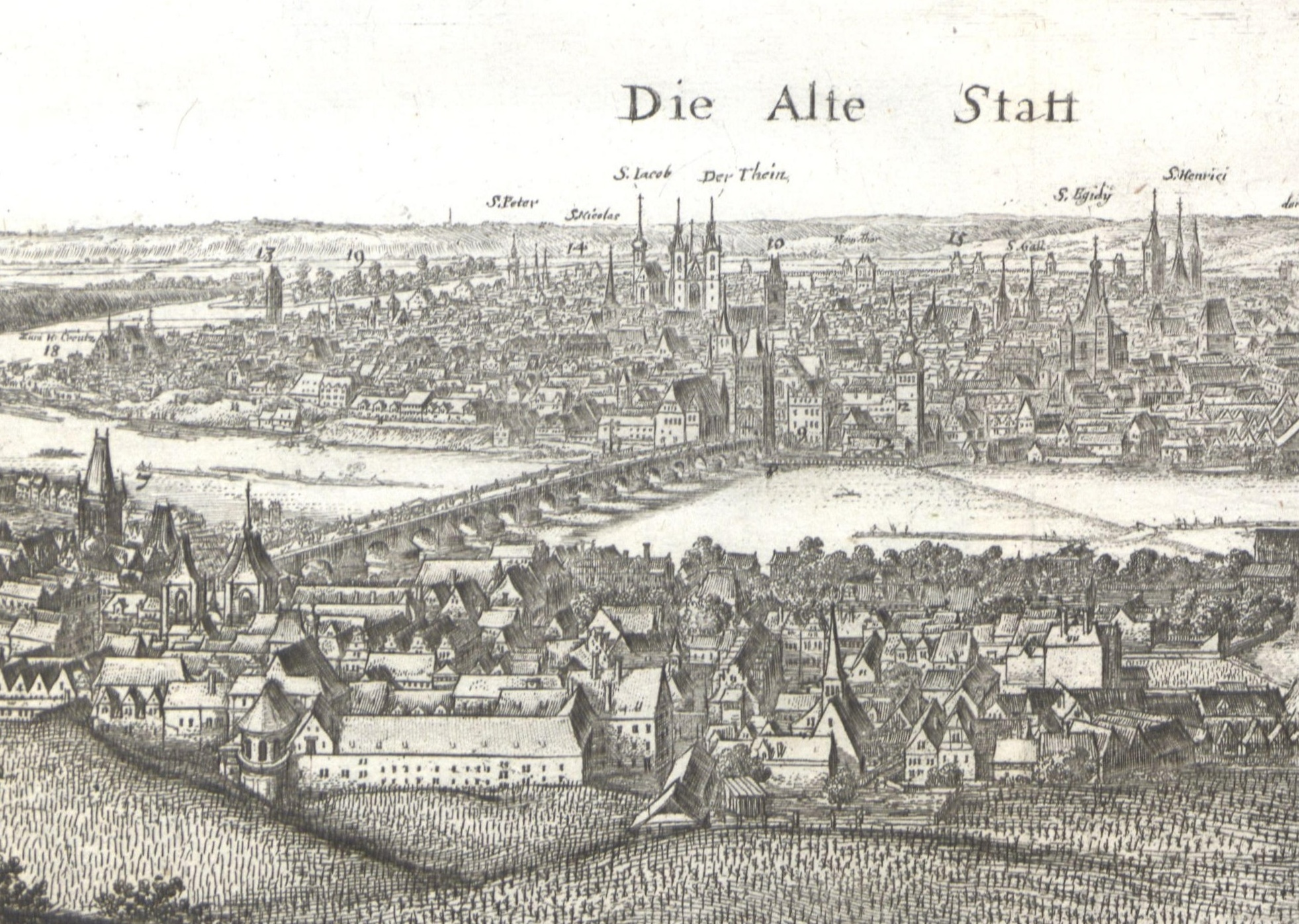
Detail, Die Alte Statt, the Old Town

Hollar's view can be compared with two great views of the 17th century, Sadelerovým prospect, which drew on own view Filip van den Bosch, and in 1606 published a prospect by Aegidius Sadeler and Folperta van Ouden Allen from 1685.

Hollar approached the problem realistically, while the two booklets mentioned came from Veduta tradition and captured an idealized Prague and especially from above. Now Hollar captured the perspective of the actual space required, changed the view of Petrin Hill and at the same time he managed to capture "the real picture of the city with its scenic relief and unique atmosphere".

== Sources ==
- Lazarová, Markéta a Lukas, Jiří. Praha: obraz města v 16. a 17. století: soupis grafických pohledů = Prague: picture of the town in the 16th and 17th centuries: list of views on graphic art pieces = Prag: Stadtbild im 16. und 17. Jahrhundert: Verzeichnis graphischer Ansichten. Praha: Argo, 2002. ISBN 80-7203-433-2.
- Pennington, Richard. A Descriptive Catalogue of the Etched Work of Wenceslaus Hollar 1607–1677. Cambridge; New York : Cambridge University Press, 1982. ISBN 052122408X.
- Volrábová, Alena, ed. a Brixová, Michaela. Václav Hollar 1607-1677 a Evropa mezi životem a zmarem: [Národní galerie v Praze - Sbírka grafiky a kresby, Sbírka starého umění: Palác Kinských, 12.10.2007-14.1.2008]. V Praze: Národní galerie, 2007. 370 s. ISBN 978-80-7035-361-5., s. 232–233.
