= HMS Defiance (1666) =

Ship of the line of the Royal Navy

History

England
- Name: HMS Defiance
- Builder: William Castle, Deptford
- Launched: 27 March 1666
- Commissioned: Spring 1666
- Fate: Burnt by accident, 6 December 1668

General characteristics
- Class & type: 64-gun third rate ship of the line
- Tons burthen: 863.5 tons
- Length: 117 ft (36 m) (keel)
- Beam: 37 ft 3 in (11.35 m)
- Depth of hold: 15 ft 3 in (4.65 m)
- Propulsion: Sails
- Sail plan: Full-rigged ship
- Complement: 320
- Armament: 64 guns comprising 22 demi-cannon, 28 culverins and 14 demi-culverins

HMS Defiance was a 64-gun third rate ship of the line of the English Royal Navy, ordered on 26 October 1664 under the new construction programme of that year, and launched on 27 March 1666 at William Castle's private shipyard at Deptford in the presence of King Charles II.

She was commissioned under Sir Robert Holmes and took part in the Four Days Battle on 1 June 1666 – 4 June 1666. Following the battle, Holmes was briefly replaced by Captain William Flawes, but a month later command was taken by Rear-Admiral Sir John Kempthorne. In September 1667 Holmes, now Commander-in-Chief at Portsmouth, was back in command, but later that year he gave way to Sir John Harman in the same role. Defiance was accidentally destroyed by fire at Chatham on 6 December 1668.

Samuel Pepys was a member of the Court Martial of the ship's gunner who was accused of causing the loss of the ship. In Pepys' diary entry for 25 March 1669, he writes that the ship was lost due to the "neglect" of the gunner "in trusting a girl to carry fire into his cabin".
