= HMS Mary Grace =

Three ships of the Royal Navy have borne the name HMS Mary Grace:

- HMS Mary Grace (1468) was a ship purchased in 1468 and listed until 1480.
- HMS Mary Grace (1522) was a hoy captured in 1522 and listed until 1525.
- HMS Mary Grace (1560) was a storeship captured in 1560 and listed until 1562.

== See also ==
- HMS Mary
