= HMS Mary Galley =

Two ships of the Royal Navy have borne the name HMS Mary Galley:

- HMS Mary Galley (1687) was a 32-gun fifth rate launched in 1687. She underwent a 'great repair' in 1708, and was again rebuilt in 1727 by Peirson Lock at Plymouth Dockyard. She was broken up in 1743.
- HMS Mary Galley (1744) was a 44-gun fifth rate launched in 1744 and sunk as a breakwater in 1764.

== See also ==
- HMS Mary
