= HMS Mary James =

Two ships of the Royal Navy have borne the name HMS Mary James:

- HMS Mary James (1512) was a ship purchased in 1512 and listed until 1529.
- HMS Mary James (1545) was a ship captured in 1545 and listed until 1546.

== See also ==
- HMS Mary
- HMS James
