= HMS Kingfisher (1675) =

Ship of the line of the Royal Navy

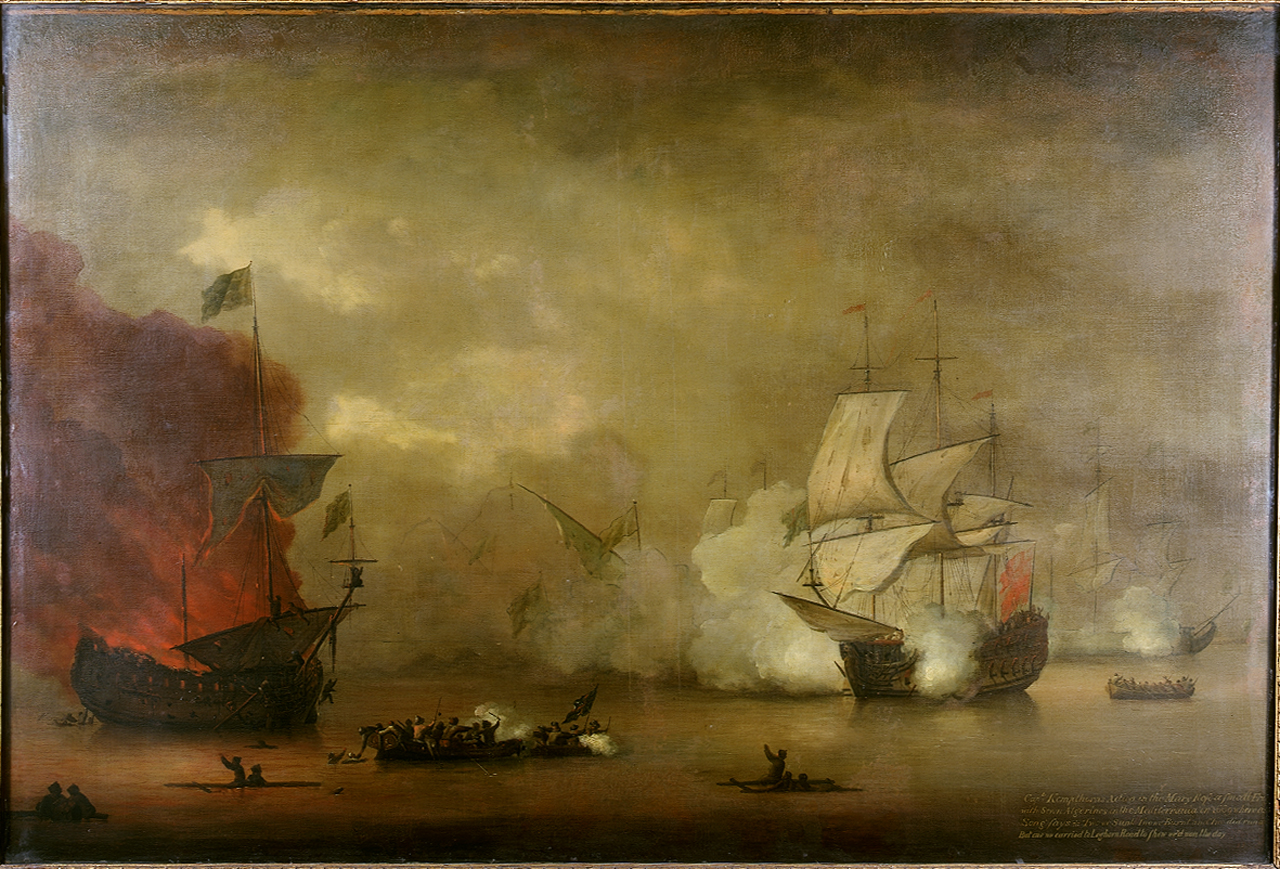
- Painting signed by Peter Monamy, and dated 1734, which was probably intended to depict Kingfisher's fight with seven Algerines

History

Great Britain
- Name: Kingfisher
- Builder: Phineas Pett III, Woolwich Dockyard
- Launched: 1675
- Fate: Broken up, 1728

General characteristics as built
- Class & type: 46-gun fourth-rate ship of the line
- Tons burthen: 663 (bm)
- Length: 110 ft (34 m) (keel)
- Beam: 33 ft 8 in (10.26 m)
- Depth of hold: 13 ft (4.0 m)
- Sail plan: Full-rigged ship
- Armament: 46 guns of various weights of shot

General characteristics after 1699 rebuild
- Class & type: 46-54-gun fourth rate ship of the line
- Tons burthen: 691 (bm)
- Length: 125 ft 8 in (38.30 m) (gundeck)
- Beam: 34 ft 4 1/2 in (10.5 m)
- Depth of hold: 12 ft 9 in (3.89 m)
- Sail plan: Full-rigged ship
- Armament: 46-54 guns of various weights of shot

Kingfisher was a 46-gun fourth-rate ship of the line of the Royal Navy, built by Phineas Pett III at Woolwich Dockyard and launched in 1675. She was specially designed to counter the attacks of Algerine corsairs, or pirates, in the Mediterranean by masquerading as a merchantman, which she achieved by hiding her armament behind false bulkheads. She also was provided with various means of changing her appearance.

== Active service ==
In 1679, Commander Morgan Kempthorne, the 21-year-old son of John Kempthorne, took command of Kingfisher, sailing her to the Mediterranean with a convoy.

=== Battle with seven Algerines ===
On 22 May 1681, soon after leaving Naples, Kingfisher encountered seven Algerine men-of-war and a settee.

The Algerines tried to deceive the English by changing their colours; first they had French, then Dutch and then some of them Algiers colours. One hoisted an English jack and a Turkish or Algerine flag at the main topmasthead.

After a long fight, the Algerines gave up, though Kempthorne was killed during the action. Including her captain, Kingfisher lost eight dead and 38 wounded in a fight that had lasted 12 hours. Kingfisher was repaired at Livorno and Kempthorne was buried there.

The battle is the subject of several works of art. James II, at the time Duke of York, commissioned an oil painting from Willem van de Velde the Elder depicting the moment when the leading Algerine ship entered the battle and engaged with Kingfisher. There also exists a mezzotint by Elisha Kirkall of the battle, previously thought to depict a similar battle by John Kempthorne, Morgan's father; the original is either a painting by Willem van de Velde the Younger, or a copy by someone such as Cornelius van de Velde of a lost painting by the Younger.

Kirkall's mezzotint is the likely basis for a 1734 painting by Peter Monamy in the National Maritime Museum (BHC0297). Although it bears the inscription "Cap^{t} Kempthorne's Action in the Mary Rose a small Frigate with seven Algerines in the Mediterranean in 1669", this inscription was probably added in the late eighteenth century, according to Geoffrey Callender and Michael S. Robinson, and is erroneous; there is no correspondence between this image and Hollar's eyewitness version, but in the centre of the painting is a small enemy boat that corresponds directly to one referred to in an account of the 1681 action in the Kingfisher. The painting had previously been attributed to Willem van de Velde the Younger, or speculated to be by van de Velde the Elder, before Monamy's signature and the date of 1734 were found when it was catalogued in the early 1930s. The inscription also contains a couple of lines recounting, with some exaggeration, the action:

Two we burnt, and two we sank, and two did run away;
But one we carried to Leghorn Roads to show we'd won the day.

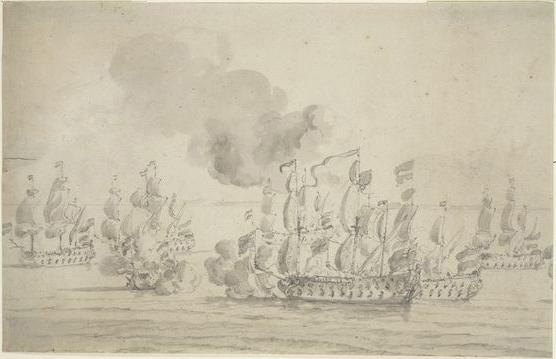
Kingfisher's action against seven Algerine ships, 22 May 1681, by Willem van de Velde, the elder

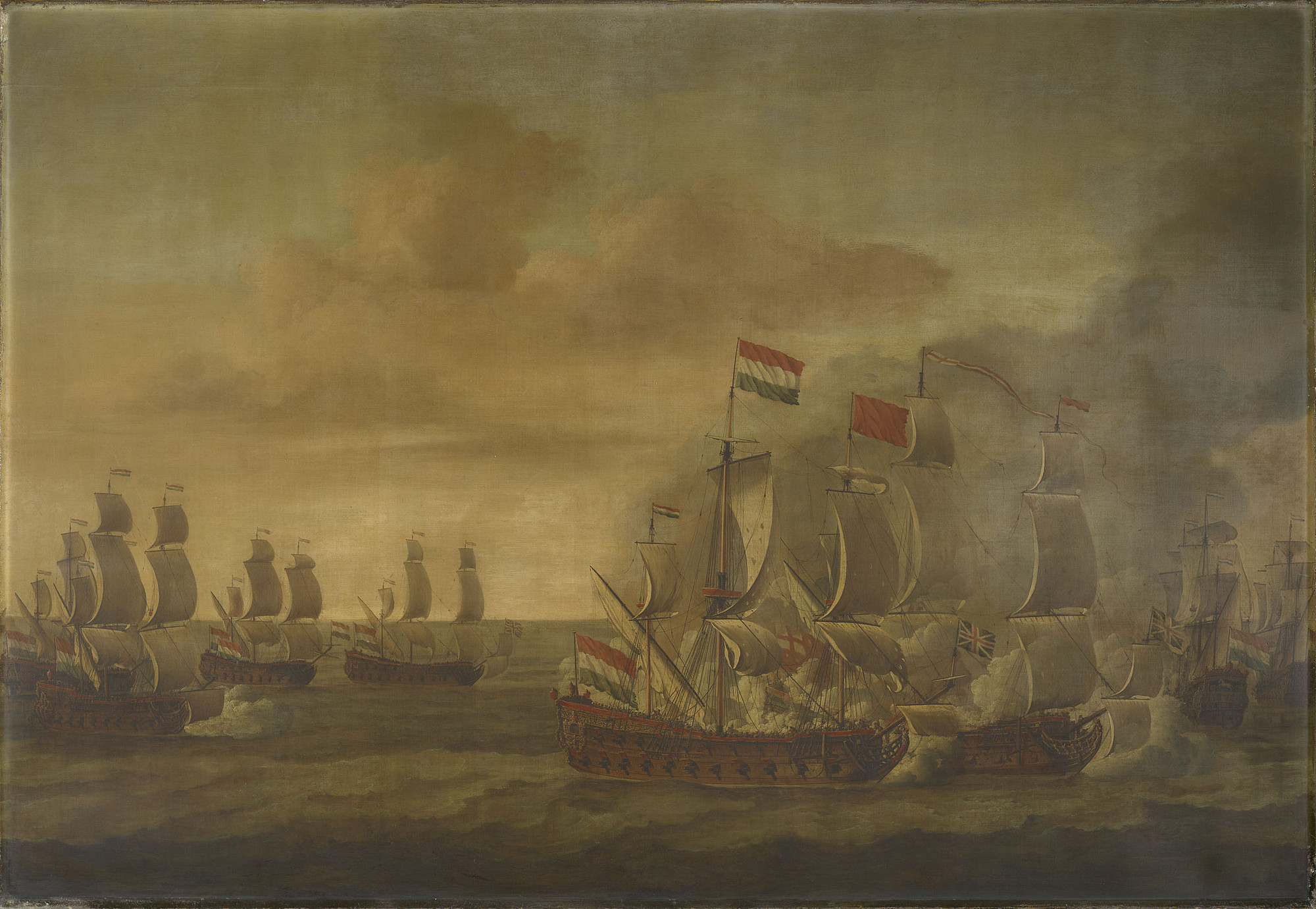
van de Velde's oil painting of the action, based on the previous sketch

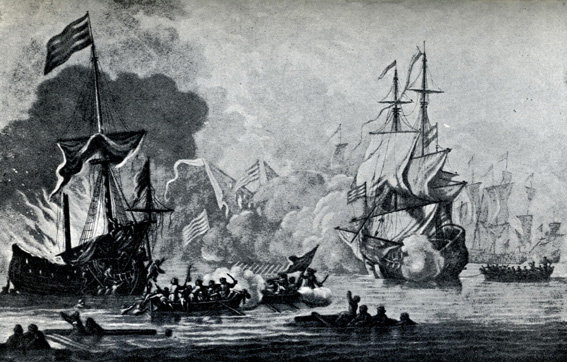
Mezzotint of the battle by Elisha Kirkall

Possibly the original of Kirkall's mezzotint

=== Sallee pirates ===
Three months later, Francis Wheler, formerly captain of Nonsuch, took command of Kingfisher from her lieutenant, Ralph Wrenn, who took command of Nonsuch. In October, Kingfisher fought and captured a large Sallee pirate, which however sank shortly after striking.

=== Argyll's Ringing ===
In 1685, during the rebellion of Archibald Campbell, 9th Earl of Argyll, against King James, Kingfisher bombarded Carrick Castle, badly damaging the keep, which lost its roof. She also captured Sophia, of 145 tons (bm) and 12 guns, which the navy took into service as HMS Sophia. Captain Thomas Hamilton commanded Kingfisher in this action.

In 1687 Captain Thomas Hamilton died while Kingfisher was at Boston, Massachusetts.

== Fate ==
Kingfisher was rebuilt at Woolwich in 1699, as a Fourth Rate of 46–54 guns. She was hulked in 1706, and was broken up in 1728.
