= HMS James =

Four ships of the Royal Navy and Commonwealth of England navy have borne the name James:

- English ship James (1417) was a balinger acquired in 1417 and given away in 1422.
- English ship James (1634) was a 48-gun ship launched in 1634. She was renamed Old James in 1660 and was sold in 1682.
- English ship James (1649) was a 30-gun ship, previously the Royalist Exchange. She was captured by the Parliamentarians in 1649 and listed until 1650.
- HMS James (1665) was a hoy captured from the Dutch in 1665, but recaptured in 1673.

== See also ==
- HMS James Galley
- HMS James and Eliza
- HMS James Watt
- HMS Royal James
