= HMS Mary (1704) =

Ship of the line of the Royal Navy

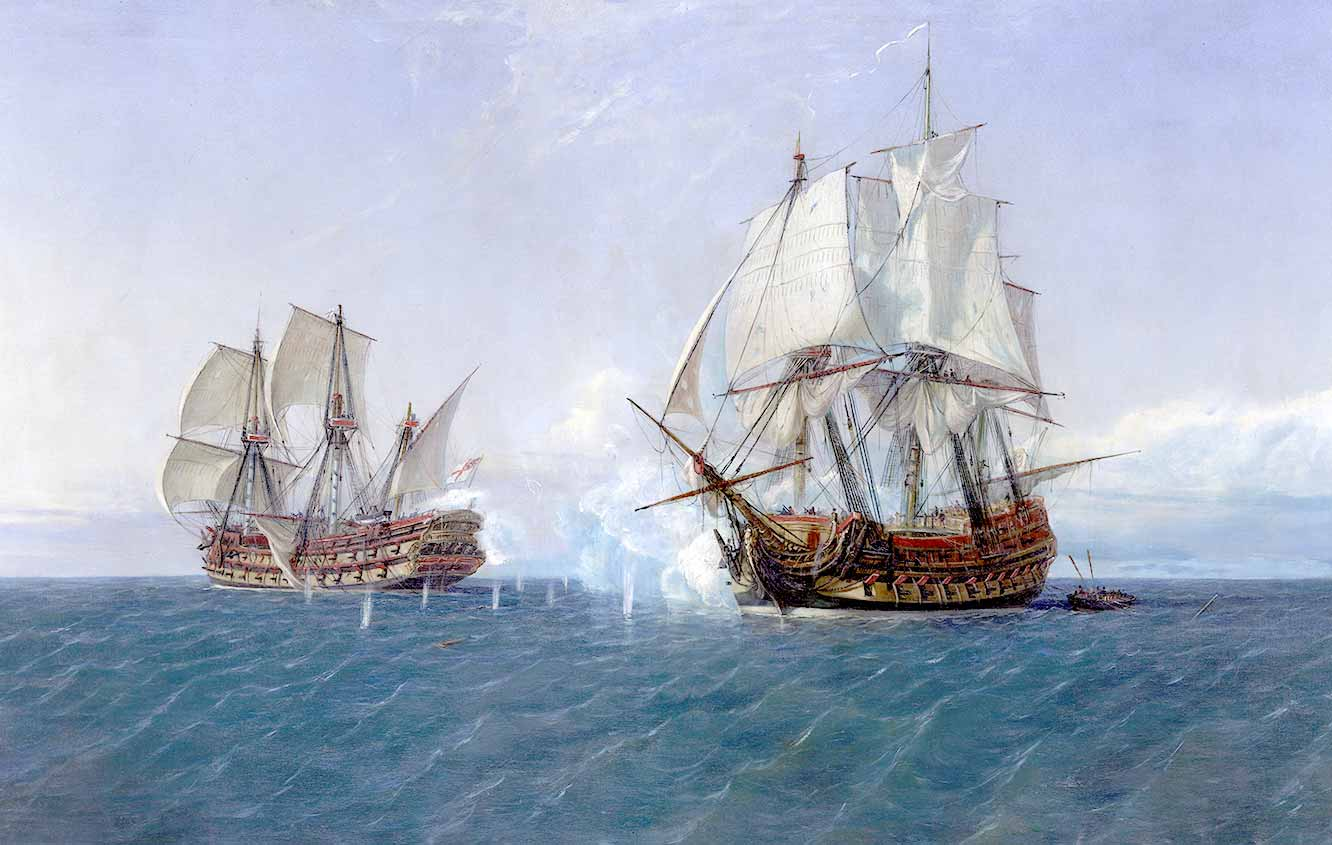
- HMS Mary (left) battling against the Spanish ship of the line Catalán in January 1721

History

Great Britain
- Name: HMS Mary
- Builder: Shortis, Chatham Dockyard
- Launched: 12 May 1704
- Renamed: HMS Princess Mary, 1742
- Fate: Sold, 1766

General characteristics as built
- Class & type: 60-gun fourth rate ship of the line
- Tons burthen: 914
- Length: 145 ft (44.2 m) (gundeck)
- Beam: 37 ft 6 in (11.4 m)
- Depth of hold: 15 ft 8 in (4.8 m)
- Propulsion: Sails
- Sail plan: Full-rigged ship
- Armament: 60 guns of various weights of shot

General characteristics after 1742 rebuild
- Class & type: 1733 proposals 70-gun third rate ship of the line
- Tons burthen: 1068
- Length: 144 ft (43.9 m) (gundeck)
- Beam: 41 ft 5 in (12.6 m)
- Depth of hold: 16 ft 11 in (5.2 m)
- Propulsion: Sails
- Sail plan: Full-rigged ship
- Armament: 60 guns: Gundeck: 24 × 24-pdrs; Upper gundeck: 26 × 9-pdrs; Quarterdeck: 8 × 6-pdrs; Forecastle: 2 × 6-pdrs

HMS Mary was a 60-gun fourth rate ship of the line of the Royal Navy, built at Chatham Dockyard and launched on 12 May 1704.

In January 1721, Mary fought an inconclusive battle against the Spanish ship of the line Catalán.

Orders were issued on 15 December 1736 for Mary to be taken to pieces and rebuilt according to the 1733 proposals of the 1719 Establishment at Portsmouth, from where she was relaunched on 5 October 1742, and renamed HMS Princess Mary.

Princess Mary served until 1766, when she was sold out of the navy.
