= Battle of Cádiz (1669) =

1669 naval battle

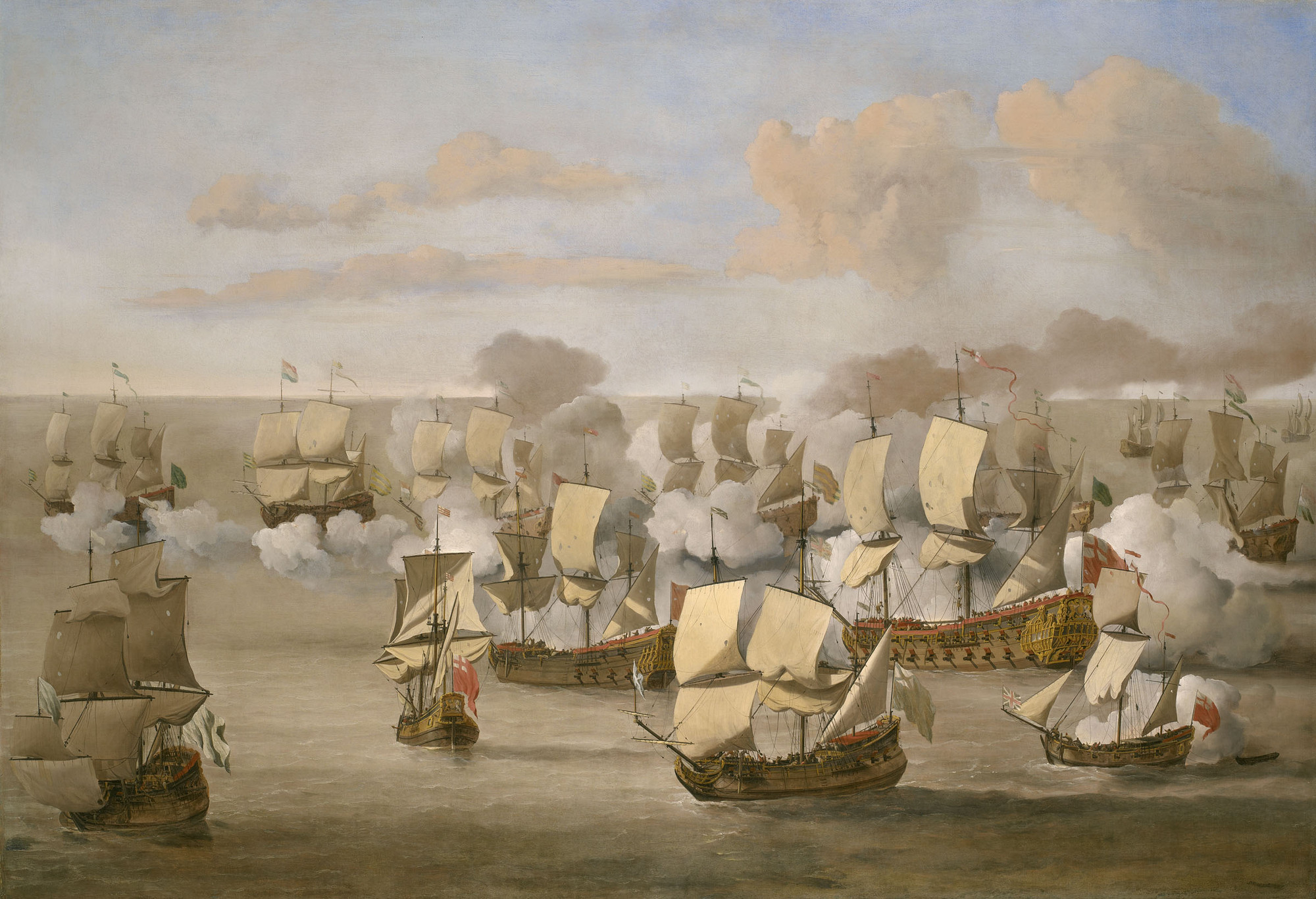
- The "Mary Rose" Action, 28 December 1669; Willem van de Velde the Younger, c. 1676
Date	18–19 December 1669
Location	Off Cádiz, Atlantic Ocean 36°29′N 6°23′W
Result	English victory

Belligerents
England	Regency of Algiers

Commanders and leaders
John Kempthorne	Unknown

Strength
1 frigate 1 ketch 1 pink	6 frigates 1 sloop

Casualties and losses
12 killed 18 wounded	Heavy

The Battle of Cádiz was fought on 18–19 December 1669 off Cádiz between the English Royal Navy warship HMS Mary Rose under Rear-admiral John Kempthorne, which was escorting several English merchantmen, and a squadron of seven Barbary corsairs operating out of the Regency of Algiers. The incident was recorded and drawn by the engraver Wenceslaus Hollar, with an engraving appearing in John Ogilby's 1670 work Africa.

The action occurred while Mary Rose was returning from a diplomatic mission to Al-Rashid of Morocco that had been conducted by Lord Henry Howard, with Hollar accompanying him in order to complete some drawings and maps of Tangier that he had begun some years earlier. The frigate was towing a merchant ship, King David, that Kempthorne had recaptured from Algerian corsairs, and was accompanied by five other vessels.

The convoy encountered a squadron of seven Barbary corsairs on 18 December 1669, with six attacking Mary Rose while one pursued King David that Kempthorne had cut loose. The corsairs withdrew as night fell, resuming their attack on the morning of the 19th. Despite Mary Rose sustaining damage to all three masts, she held off the attack, and the corsairs withdrew, capturing only King David. After repairs at Cádiz, Mary Rose returned to England in April 1670, and Kempthorne was knighted for "his very great valour". A version of Hollar's engraving of the battle was done by Willem van de Velde the Younger.

== Background ==
HMS Mary Rose, a 48-gun fourth-rate warship of the Royal Navy conveyed Lord Henry Howard, with an entourage of 70 attendants and £4000 in gifts, to Tangier in 1668 or 1669. The visit was on the order of Charles II of England to negotiate a commercial treaty with the sultan of Morocco, Al-Rashid, also known as "Tafiletta". The engraver Wenceslaus Hollar formed part of the expedition on his own request to finish drawings of Tangier he had started when he accompanied Howard's grandfather on a similar mission in 1636. The meeting with Mulay Rashid was delayed for eleven months and ended up not taking place at all; then, according to Hollar, Howard obtained a "Letter of Security" from Mulay Rashid and "purposd himself" to "go by Land, and the Ship by Sea to Salee" from where they "set Sail on Wednesday the eighth of the said Month at two a clock in the morning".

Mary Rose was accompanied by three ships: a small narrow-sterned ship of shallow draught or pink, the two-masted ketch Roe which had come from England with her, and a Hamburg merchantman, referred to in contemporary accounts as the "Hamborough frigate." They passed Asilah that evening. After midnight, they overtook a large flyboat of 300 tons, loaded with timber, tobacco, salt, and malt. This proved to be King David, an English merchantmen that had sailed from the New England Colonies to Cádiz. Off Cape St. Vincent, she had been captured by a group of Barbary corsairs from the Regency of Algiers, and her crew had been forced into slavery. When Mary Rose and convoy found her, she carried a prize crew of 22 Algerians, as well as one Russian and two Englishmen; Hollar writes that "we transported them aboard [Mary Rose], and sent other men aboard her."

An English prize crew was sent aboard, and King David was to follow the convoy to Salé. However, the recaptured ship was both poorly built for speed and laden with cargo, and Mary Rose was obliged to tow her, retarding the convoy's progress. Consequently, they did not arrive at Salé until the 11th, where they met a two-masted brigantine from Tangier with Englishmen aboard. This vessel told them that there was an insurrection in progress and that they could not land, and recommended that they try to pick up some of the people ashore. The convoy remained there until the 13th, though failing to bring anyone aboard as they were detained in Salé. A storm forced them to leave the shore, towing the brigantine astern. The storm continued for the next few days, during which, says Hollar, Mary Rose took on the brigantine's crew and passengers and let her go. On the 15th they sighted Rota, but were unable to put in because of the contrary wind. On the 17th the convoy was joined by two merchantmen, one French and one Scottish, bound from the Canary Islands to Cádiz. Several times during these few days Mary Rose saw two Algerian men of war; these merchantmen had also seen the men of war and come to the convoy for protection.

== Battle ==
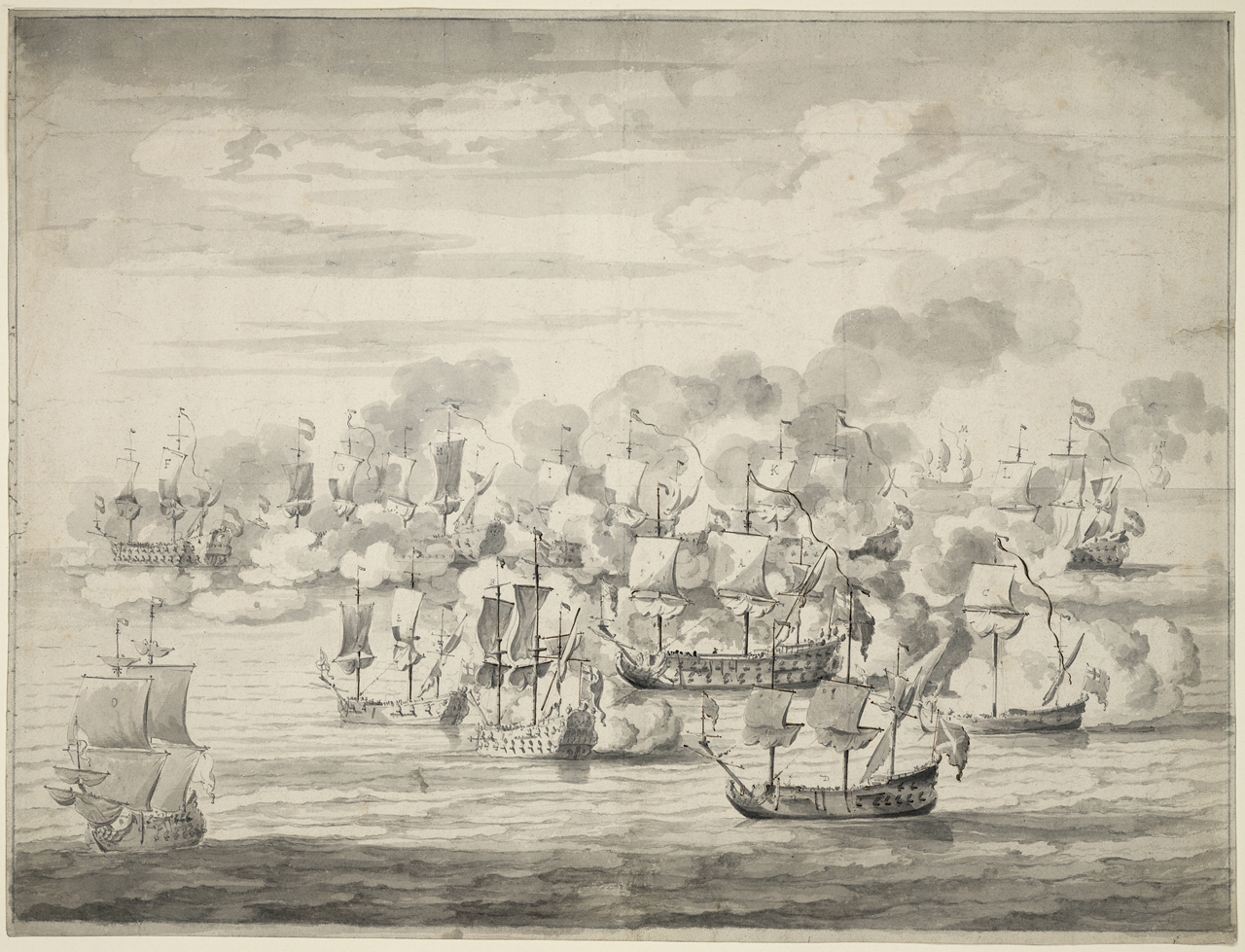
Illustration by van der Velde based on Hollar's eyewitness engraving of the battle

At dawn on the 18th, Mary Rose sighted seven Algerian corsairs. Mary Rose immediately prepared for action, clearing the decks in order to work the guns, taking on the prize-crew of King David and abandoning her to be driven by the wind, and throwing overboard anything that might prove a hindrance. The Algerian ships passed near noon; one of the prisoners, a Dutchman, identified them as Golden Lion, Orange Tree, Half Moon, Seven Stars, White Horse, Blewhart, and Rose Leaf. Half Moon, not built for speed and also loaded down with men, fell behind, and the others sent two boats to tow her; Admiral Kempthorne sent out a boat to intercept theirs, but the Algerians sent out another boat, well-armed, and Kempthorne recalled the English boat. The Algerian ships stood close together, and around 3:00 six of them attacked Mary Rose, while Rose Leaf chased the abandoned King David. Hollar described "a hot Service, and much harm done on both sides," until night fell and the Algerian ships retired.

Early the next morning the two groups engaged again. The Algerians approached in a line from the southeast: Half Moon was first, and she and subsequent ships fired, both with broadsides from the ships' guns and with small-arms, on Mary Rose before steering away to the northeast. According to Hollar's account, Mary Rose replied firing every other gun, in order to be able to keep up a consistent fire on all the approaching ships. Golden Lion, the Algerian flagship, was in the rear, intending to board. However, Mary Rose hit her hull below the waterline with one shot and destroyed her mainsail with another, and she, along with the other Algerian ships, retreated. During the battle, the French and Scottish merchantmen escaped; a number of Jews and Armenians aboard the pink, according to Hollar, attempted to hand the ship over to the Algerians, but the latter mistook it for a fire ship sent by the English to destroy them, and the attempt failed when the squadron retreated. The English casualties were 12 men killed and 18 wounded; according to Owen Hurst, Mary Rose had all three masts damaged, and her mainmast, foremast, and both topmast yards disabled.

== Aftermath ==
Mary Rose arrived in Cádiz on the 20th. Kempthorne sold the 22 Algerian prisoners into slavery; two were bought by the English consul there. Mary Rose returned to England in April 1670 with a 30-ship convoy of Mediterranean merchantmen and a cargo of silver, whereupon Kempthorne was knighted for "his very great valour and conduct shown against the pirates of Algiers." King David, which had been taken by Rose Leaf, was recaptured by Sir Thomas Allin, who ordered her to be sold with her cargo as a prize at Málaga; the original owners successfully petitioned to have them restored. In July 1670, Charles II ordered that money earned from selling Moorish prisoners should henceforth be put into a fund for the redemption of English subjects sold into slavery in Algiers, beginning with King David's crew, including master Edward Clements and supercargo Jeremiah Armiger, who had put up three days' resistance before being captured. Sailors who had fought well were also to be given preference in the future.

Hollar, who reportedly sat on deck sketching during the action, later produced an etching of the battle, which was included in John Ogilby's 1670 work Africa. The picture depicted the Algerian ships engaging Mary Rose and Roe while Rose Leaf chased King David to the southeast, the French merchantman escaped to the northwest, and the other merchantmen sheltered behind Mary Rose. Willem van de Velde the Younger made his own drawing of the battle based on Hollar's in c. 1675. An oil painting by van de Velde based on Hollar's etching of the engagement is currently part of the Royal Collection, where it has been held at least since 1687, and is currently on public display at Hampton Court Palace. A copy of the painting with Adriaen van Diest's monogram inscribed on the reverse was recorded as being owned the Leger Gallery in London in 1973, and another is the collection of Castle Howard. Both paintings were possibly commissioned during Kempthorne's lifetime or by his family: alterations from the original were made to the flags in order to correct them. A painting by Peter Monamy in the National Maritime Museum has an inscription stating that it depicts the battle. It is more likely, however, that it was intended to depict a similar battle fought in 1681 by Morgan Kempthorne, Kempthorne's son, when he was commanding HMS Kingfisher.

Following the battle, exaggerated references to the engagement have become fodder for a popular English naval ballad sometimes titled "Turkish Men of War" or "The Royal Oak" sometimes sung with lyrics mixing up names and numbers of the ships involved.
