= John Kempthorne (Royal Navy officer) =

Vice-Admiral Sir John Kempthorne
- Born: c. 1620
- Died: 19 October 1679; Portsmouth
- Military career
- Allegiance: Kingdom of England
- Branch: Royal Navy
- Service years: 1664–1679
- Rank: Vice-Admiral
- Commands: Kent; Dunkirk; Royal James; Old James; Royal Charles; Defiance; Warspite; Mary Rose
- Conflicts: Battle of Lowestoft; Four Days Battle; Battle of Cádiz (1669); Battle of Solebay; Battle of Schooneveld; Battle of Texel
- Awards: Knighthood

Sir John Kempthorne (c. 1620 – 19 October 1679) was an officer in the English Royal Navy during the Second and Third Anglo-Dutch Wars, who eventually rose to the rank of Vice-Admiral.

== Childhood and early years ==
Kempthorne was born the second son of John Kempthorne, an attorney of Ugborough, Devon, and his wife Agnes Simon.

Little is known about the younger Kempthorne's early life, but his father was a Royalist supporter and had served as a cavalry officer in the English Civil War. While his father was in the military, the younger John Kempthorne embarked on a life at sea. He began his career as an apprentice to the master of a vessel sailing out of Topsham. He soon moved up the ranks and took command of a number of ships of the Levant Company, trading in the Mediterranean. Privateering was common in the Mediterranean, and in 1657 Kempthorne's ship – probably the Eastland Merchant – was captured after a hard-fought battle by the Spanish privateer Papachino. Kempthorne was treated well by Papachino, and after the Spaniard was captured and imprisoned in the Tower of London in 1658 Kempthorne repaid the kindness and eventually procured Papachino's release.

Kempthorne was elected a brother of Trinity House on 17 November 1660, and continued to command ships in the Mediterranean. He was captain of the Maidenhead between 1662 and 1663, when she was requisitioned by the Turks to carry troops to Crete. The ambassador at Constantinople, Heneage Finch, 3rd Earl of Winchilsea, remarked that 'the captain has always been a man of loyal principles'.

== Naval career ==
The breakdown of relations between England and the Dutch Republic prior to the Second Anglo-Dutch War led to a period of armament and mobilization. Kempthorne received his first command in 1664, probably through the influence of his father's old commanding officer, Prince Rupert of the Rhine. Kempthorne commanded the Kent from June to October 1664, followed by a move to the Dunkirk. He then moved on 26 November to take command of the Royal James. He commanded her at the Battle of Lowestoft on 3 June 1665 where she was Prince Rupert's flagship. The result was a crushing defeat for the Dutch. Kempthorne was then appointed to command the Old James on 19 July after her captain, James Ley, 3rd Earl of Marlborough, had been killed in the battle. Coincidentally Ley had been a distant relative of the Kempthornes. Kempthorne then moved to the Royal Charles in February 1666. He was flag captain to George Monck, 1st Duke of Albemarle at the Four Days Battle between 1 and 4 June June 1666, which ended in a Dutch victory. Kempthorne then took command of the Defiance on 10 June. In September he was promoted to flag rank, becoming rear-admiral of the Blue squadron.

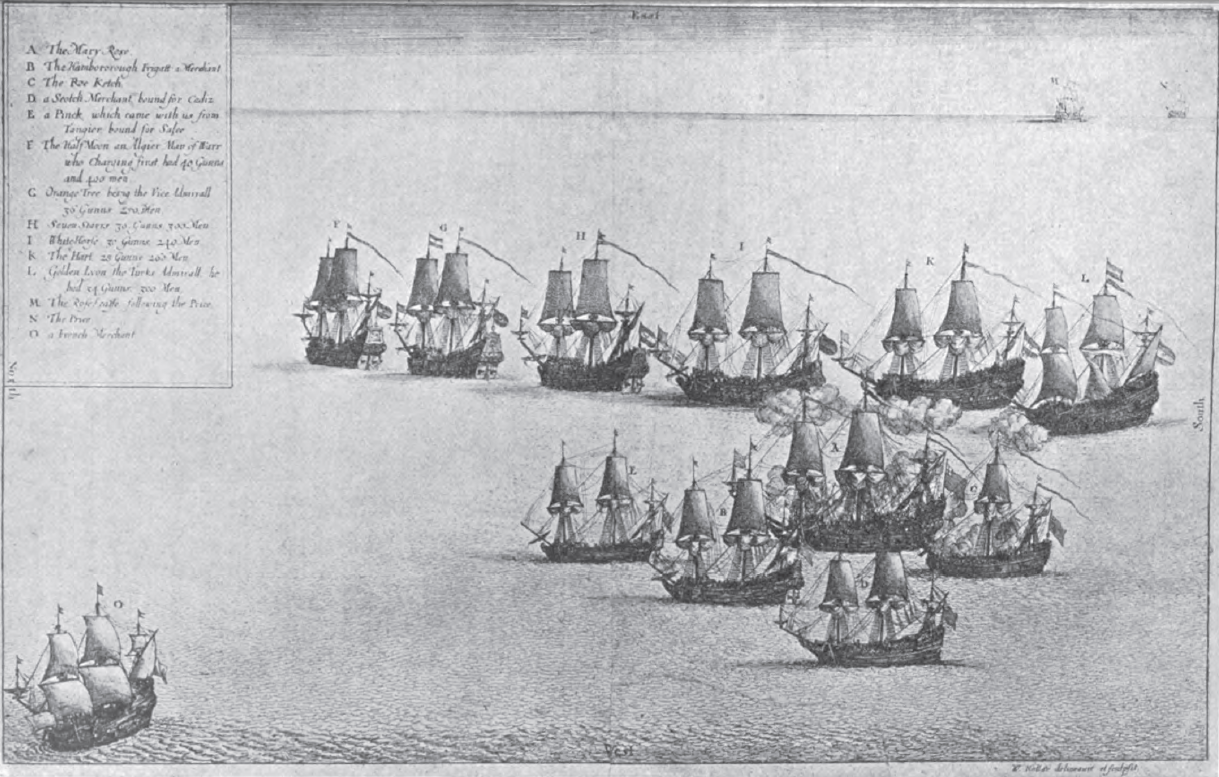
The Mary Rose in a battle with seven Algerine corsairs, an engraving by Wenceslas Hollar

Kempthorne remained with the Defiance until the end of 1667, commanding one of the flying squadrons. He escorted several merchant convoys to the Mediterranean between February and May 1667, followed by a period based out of Plymouth to counter Dutch raids. He then cruised off Ireland during the summer, eventually leaving the Defiance in December 1667 and taking command of the Warspite during the summer of 1668. His next command was his move in early 1669 to the Mary Rose. The Mary Rose conveyed Lord Howard as ambassador to Morocco. Kempthorne landed him at Tangier, and then began to escort a multinational convoy of six merchantmen. They were attacked by seven Algerine corsairs on 18 December as they sailed north of Cádiz. Kempthorne took the Mary Rose in to engage them, in a battle that lasted all that day and into the next and saw the Mary Rose engaged by as many as six of the enemy at a time. The Mary Rose suffered severe damage to her masts and rigging, but disabled the enemy admiral's vessel and forced the entire force to withdraw. Kempthorne brought the convoy safely into Cádiz on 20 December. On board the Mary Rose during the battle had been the engraver Wenceslas Hollar, who produced a representation of the event. Kempthorne was rewarded with a knighthood on 24 April 1670.

Kempthorne returned to active service again on the outbreak of the Third Anglo-Dutch War in 1672, with the St Andrew as his flagship. He was present at the Battle of Solebay, which ended in a draw with heavy English losses. After seeing the Royal James, the ship of his commander Edward Montagu, 1st Earl of Sandwich, under heavy attack, he made several attempts to come to his relief but was beaten back on each occasion.'

he … fought till eight with as much conduct and bravery as ever man in the world did, continually engaged on both sides almost the whole day'

Kempthorne later admitted that this had been the hardest action that he had ever fought.

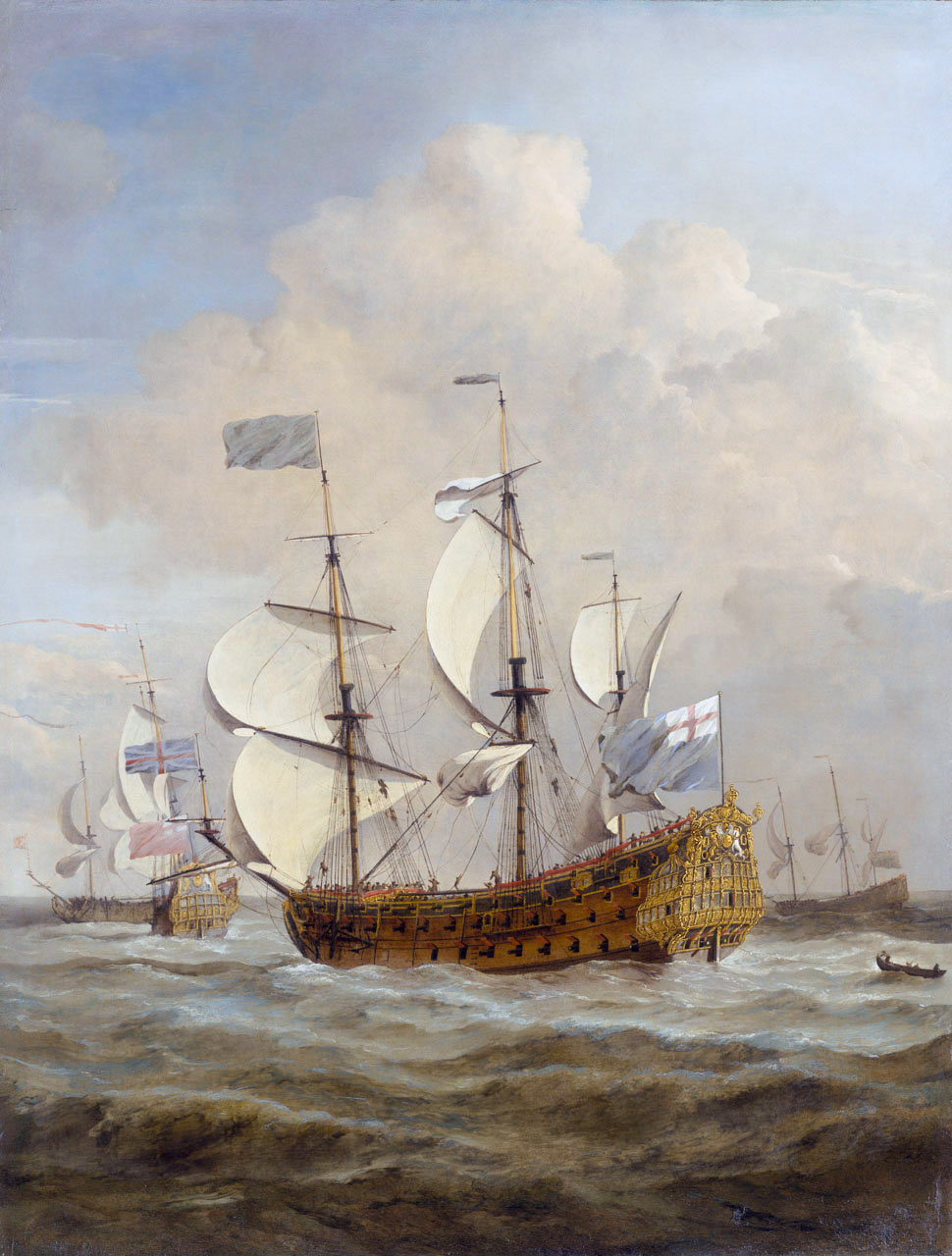
The St Andrew, painted by Willem van de Velde the Younger. She is flying Kempthorne's flag, and the painting was therefore probably commissioned by him.

Kempthorne was then promoted to rear-admiral of the red, and later vice-admiral of the blue, at which rank he was part of the 1673 campaign under Sir Edward Spragge. He was present at the Battle of Schooneveld and the Battle of Texel, both of which were indecisive engagements. The latter battle led to recriminations and accusations amongst the commanders of the fleet, Kempthorne criticising the conduct of his rear-admiral, Thomas Butler, 6th Earl of Ossory, though he later retracted them.

Kempthorne left the St Andrew in October 1673, drawing a flag officer's pension of £200 per annum. He was master of Trinity House in 1674–5 and was also the first steward of the club for naval captains, established in 1674. He became resident commissioner of the navy at Portsmouth, where he became good friends with the governor, George Legge, who had also fought in the Dutch wars. With the threat of war with France, in 1678 Kempthorne briefly returned to active service, taking up the post of vice-admiral of the narrow seas, with his flag aboard the Royal Charles. He became MP for Portsmouth alongside Legge in February 1679, but died in Portsmouth on 19 October 1679. He was buried in St Thomas's Church, and a memorial was later erected to him. In his will he left land in Bigbury, Devon, and shares in five merchantmen. He had continued to own merchant ships during his merchant career, hiring some of them to the navy.

== Family and personal life ==
Kempthorne married Joanna (d. 1691), who was a servant to Lady Bendish, the wife of Thomas Bendish, the British ambassador to Constantinople from 1647 to 1661. They had three surviving sons who went on to have naval careers. The eldest, also named John, was born in 1651. He joined the East India Company in 1682 and died in 1692. The next oldest, Morgan, was born at Leghorn in 1655. He was killed while in command of the Kingfisher during a battle against seven Algerine pirates. The youngest son, Rupert, commanded a fireship but was killed in a tavern brawl in 1691. The couple also had a daughter, who married the naval commander Sir William Reeves. Reeves commanded the Royal Sovereign at the battle of the Texel, where his father-in-law had been one of the commanders. Reeves was wounded in the battle and later died.

== Sources ==
- G. A. Kempthorne, "Sir John Kempthorne and his sons", Mariner's Mirror, 12 (1926), 289–317
- R. C. Anderson, ed., Journals and narratives of the Third Dutch War, Navy RS, 86 (1946)
- J. D. Davies, Gentlemen and tarpaulins: the officers and men of the Restoration navy (1991)
- J. D. Davies, "Devon and the navy in the civil war and the Dutch wars", in The new maritime history of Devon, ed. M. Duffy and others, 1 (1992)

Parliament of England
Preceded by Richard Norton; George Carteret	Member of Parliament for Portsmouth; 1679; With: George Legge	Succeeded by George Legge; Richard Norton
