= English ship Maidstone (1654) =

Frigate of the Royal Navy

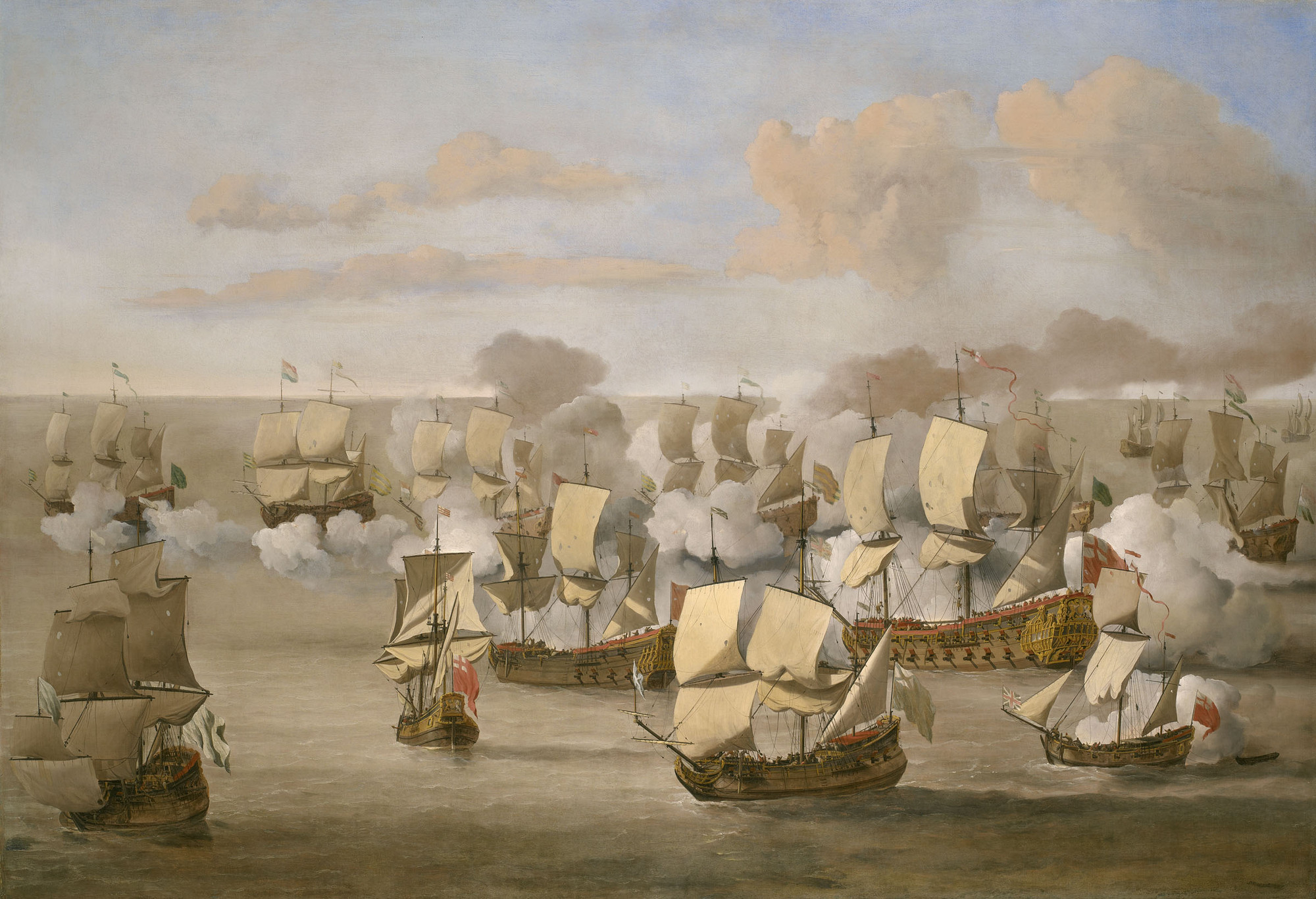
- Painting of Mary Rose at the Battle of Cádiz by Willem van de Velde the Younger

History

England
- Name: Maidstone
- Namesake: Battle of Maidstone; Mary Rose (1511 ship)
- Builder: Munday, Woodbridge
- Launched: 1654
- Renamed: Mary Rose, 1660
- Captured: 1691, by the French

France
- Acquired: 1691

General characteristics
- Class & type: Fourth-rate frigate
- Tons burthen: 556
- Length: 100 ft (30.5 m) (keel)
- Beam: 31 ft 8 in (9.7 m)
- Depth of hold: 13 ft (4.0 m)
- Sail plan: Full-rigged ship
- Armament: 40 guns (1660); 48 guns (1677)

HMS Maidstone was a 40-gun fourth-rate frigate of the Royal Navy, originally built for the navy of the Commonwealth of England at Woodbridge, Suffolk and launched in 1654. Following the 1660 Stuart Restoration, her name was changed to HMS Mary Rose. By 1677 the ships armament was increased to 48 guns. She was used in the Anglo-Dutch Wars and the War of the Grand Alliance. John Kempthorne commanded her in 1669, and fought off an attack by seven Algerian corsair ships in the aftermath of the Battle of Cádiz. Thomas Hamilton commanded the Mary Rose between 1673 and 1675. Mary Rose was captured by the French in 1691.
