= Henry Cuttance =

British naval captain

Henry Cuttance, born in Melcombe Regis, Dorset, was son of Sir Roger Cuttance, Edward Montagu's flag captain in the Naseby, in 1660.

On 1 May 1660, and according to Samuel Pepys, Cuttance was given commission of the 5th Rate frigate The Cheriton (20 guns and a crew of 90 men). He continued in command of the now renamed Speedwell, after the Restoration. In 1661, he commanded the Forester. In 1665, he commanded the Happy Return (52 guns). He fought in the Four Days Battle in June 1666 where he was assigned to Sir William Berkeley [one of two Vice-Admirals killed in the battle]'s division. He was dismissed from the service after the battle.

According to the genealogical data of the records of the Borough of Weymouth and Melcombe Regis, Henry Cuttance was admitted a freeman of the town by birth on 2 December 1659. Like his relatives Sir Roger Cuttance and Edward Cuttance, he subsequently became Mayor of the town in 1666.
