= Liefde =

Liefde (Dutch for "love") or de Liefde may refer to:

== People ==
- Bart de Liefde (born 1976), Dutch politician
- Carla de Liefde (1950–2006), Dutch basketball player
- Cornelis de Liefde (1617–1673), Dutch naval commander, brother of Johan de Liefde
- Johan de Liefde (c. 1619–1673), Dutch vice admiral

== Ships ==
- Liefde, a Dutch merchant ship that reached Japan in 1600 – see crewman William Adams (pilot), the first Englishman to reach Japan
- Liefde (East Indiaman), a Dutch sailing ship which ran aground and sank in 1711

== See also ==
- Liefde en Vrede, a suburb of Johannesburg
