= Admiral Berkeley =

Admiral Berkeley may refer to:

- George Cranfield Berkeley (1753–1818), British Royal Navy admiral
- James Berkeley, 3rd Earl of Berkeley (aft. 1679–1736), British Royal Navy vice admiral
- John Berkeley, 3rd Baron Berkeley of Stratton (1663–1697), English admiral
- Maurice Berkeley, 1st Baron FitzHardinge (1788–1867), British Royal Navy admiral
- William Berkeley (Royal Navy officer) (1639–1666), British Royal Navy vice admiral
