= Cornelis de Liefde =

Dutch Republican naval commander

- Born: Cornelis Evertsen de Liefde c. 1617; Rotterdam, Dutch Republic
- Died: 29 September 1673 (aged 56)
- Relatives: Johan de Liefde (brother)
- Military career
- Allegiance: Dutch Republic
- Branch: Dutch Republican Navy
- Service years: 1644–1673
- Rank: Schout-bij-nacht
- Wars: First Anglo-Dutch War; Second Anglo-Dutch War; Third Anglo-Dutch War †

Cornelis "Kees" Evertsen de Liefde (c. 1617 – 29 September 1673) was a Dutch naval commander, a role also fulfilled by his younger brother Johan de Liefde

== Life ==
In 1644, he was a skipper on shipping between Rotterdam and Amsterdam. During the First Anglo-Dutch War, he had no rank and it was uncertain whether he was in the navy at that time. During the Second Anglo-Dutch War, he was made a captain of the Admiralty of the Maze on 17 March 1666.

He fought in the Four Days' Battle as flag-captain to Lieutenant Admiral Aert Jansse van Nes on board the Eendragt. On 4 February 1667, he was promoted to full captain. In the Raid on the Medway he commanded the Wassenaer.

During the Third Anglo-Dutch War, he fought in the battle of Solebay, in command of the Rotterdam. He rose to schout-bij-nacht on 21 August, after commanding the Gelderland at the battle of Texel, in which he was badly wounded and in which his brother Johan was killed.

Kees married Maria Hendriks van der Lit and had five children.

== Bibliography ==
- Van der Aa, A. J. (1865). "Liefde (Cornelis de)". Biographisch Woordenboek der Nederlanden (in Dutch). Vol. 11. Haarlem: Brederode. p. 412.
- Moquette, H. C. H. (1914). "Liefde (Cornelis de)". Nieuw Nederlandsch Biografisch Woordenboek (in Dutch). Vol. 3. Leiden: Sijthoff. pp. 767–768.
