= English ship Swiftsure (1621) =

Ship of the line of the Royal Navy

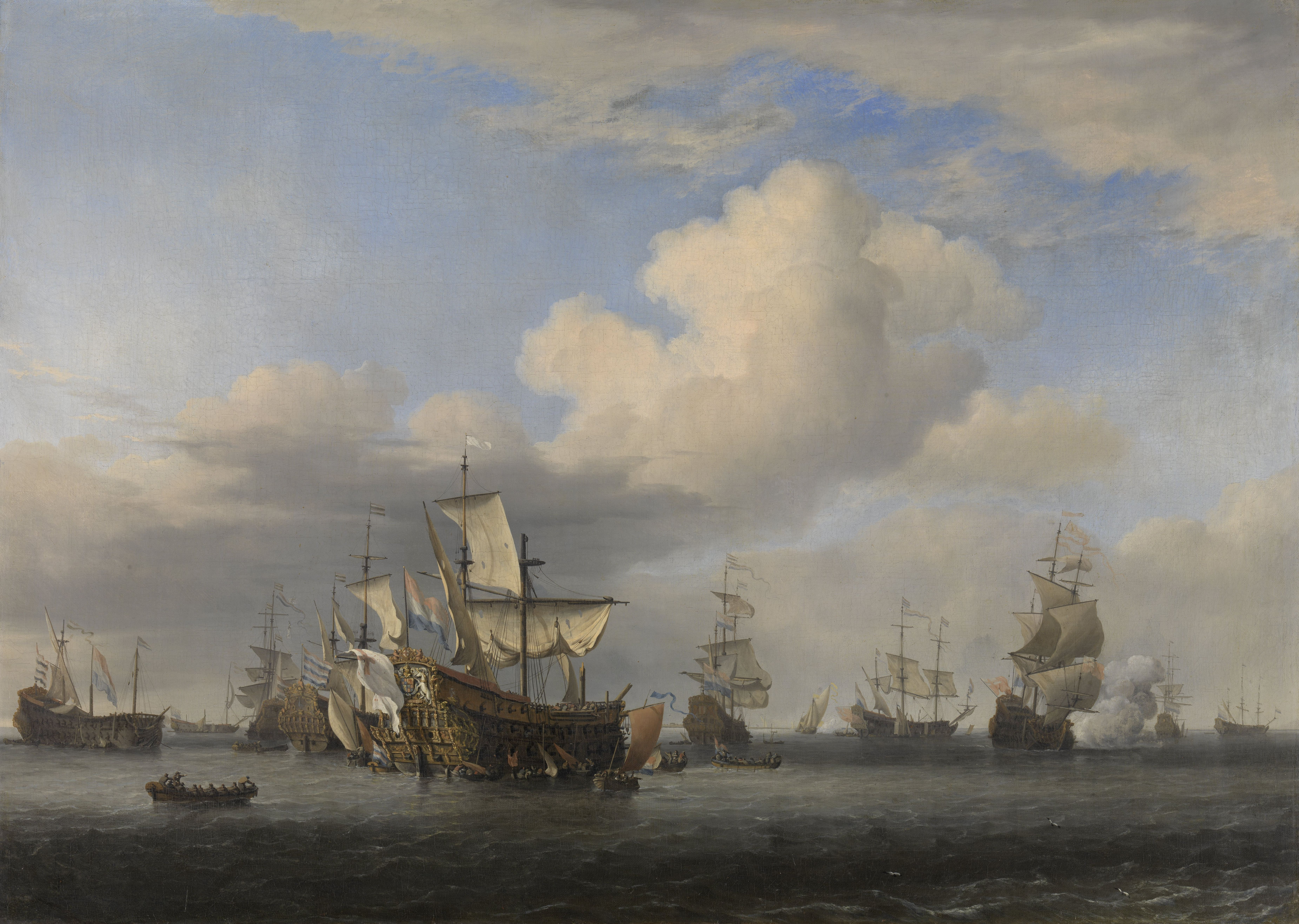
- HMS Swiftsure captured, by Willem van de Velde the Younger

History

England
- Name: HMS Swiftsure
- Builder: William Burrell, Deptford Dockyard
- Launched: 1621
- Captured: By the Dutch on 1 June 1666
- Notes: Participated in: Four Days Battle

Dutch Republic
- Acquired: 1666
- Renamed: Oudshoorn
- Notes: Participated in: Battle of Solebay

General characteristics as built
- Class & type: 42-gun Great ship
- Tons burthen: 876
- Length: 106 ft (32 m) (keel)
- Beam: 35 ft 10 in (10.92 m)
- Depth of hold: 16 ft 9 in (5.11 m)
- Propulsion: Sails
- Sail plan: Full-rigged ship
- Armament: 42 guns of various weights of shot

General characteristics after 1654 rebuild
- Class & type: 60-gun third rate ship of the line
- Tons burthen: 898
- Length: 118 ft (36 m) (keel)
- Beam: 37 ft 10 in (11.53 m)
- Depth of hold: 16 ft (4.9 m)
- Propulsion: Sails
- Sail plan: Full-rigged ship
- Armament: 60 guns of various weights of shot

Swiftsure was a 42-gun great ship or Second rate ship of the line of the Navy Royal of the Kingdom of England, built by William Burrell (Master Shipwright of the East India Company) at Deptford Dockyard and launched in 1621. In 1625 she was commanded by Sir Samuel Argall as the flagship of Vice-Admiral Robert Devereux for the Cadiz Expedition. In 1628 she was commanded by Captain John Burley as the flagship of the Earl of Moston in the attack on La Rochelle.

== Design and modification ==
The Swiftsure was the third of the six "Great Ships" (or Second rates) to be designed and built at Deptford Dockyard for James I's navy by Burrell (as well as three Third rates and a Fourth rate). The other Second Rates were the Constant Reformation, Victory, Saint Andrew, Saint George and Triumph. The first three ships were designed with a keel length of 103 ft and a beam of 34 ft, but the Swiftsure was completed with a keel length of 106 ft and a beam of 35 ft 10 in, and later the keel was extended (the overall length remaining unchanged as the rake of the stem and stern was reduced) and the breadth was increased. Her burthen tonnage increased to 92481/94 bm (nominally to 921 tons).

Like the other five of Burrell's Second rates, the Swiftsure was built as a two-decked ship with 42 guns, but during Charles I's reign a spar deck was added over the upper deck, and later this was hardened to support a third gundeck. By 1652 she carried 60 guns.

== Career ==
In 1649 the Swiftsure was taken into the navy of the Commonwealth of England. She was rebuilt in 1652–53 at Woolwich Dockyard by Master Shipwright Christopher Pett as a 60-gun Third rate ship of the line, and accordingly was not involved in any of the fleet actions of the First Anglo-Dutch War. She took part in the Battle of Santa Cruz de Tenerife on 28 April 1657.

In May 1660, during the English restoration, she seems to have carried Henry Stuart, Duke of Gloucester from Scheveningen to Dover. She was taken into the new Royal Navy as the flagship of Rear-Admiral Sir Richard Stayner. In 1661 she was the flagship of Vice-Admiral Sir John Lawson at Algiers. In March 1665 she came under the command of Captain Sir William Berkeley, and on 3 June took part in the Battle of Lowestoft. She was the flagship of the now Vice-Admiral Berkeley at the Four Days' Battle against the Dutch in 1666. Berkeley led the van of the English fleet on the first day of the battle, 1 June, but outsailed his squadron into the midst of the Dutch, and was surrounded. After a fierce battle in which Berkeley was killed, the Swiftsure was captured. The Dutch added her to the Amsterdam Admiralty and renamed her the Oudshoorn (70 cannon) and changed the quarter-galleries to hide her identity. She fought in the Dutch Van Squadron at the Battle of Solebay on 28 May 1672 (by the Julian calendar) under the command of Thomas Tobias.
