= Admiralty of Rotterdam =

One of the five admiralties of the Dutch Republic

The Admiralty of Rotterdam, also called the Admiralty of the Maze, was one of the five Dutch admiralties in the Dutch Republic.

== History ==
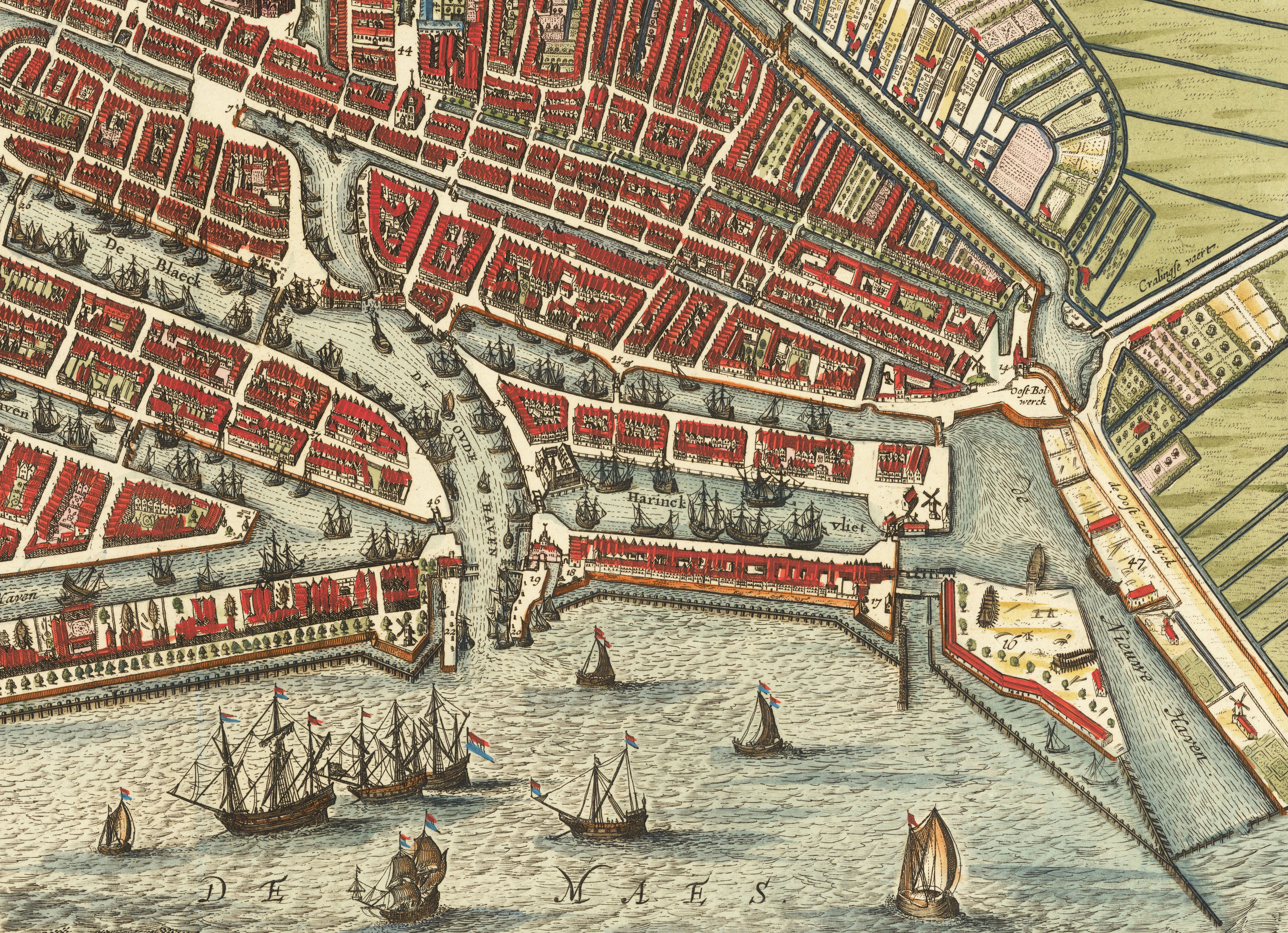
Map of the Haringvliet in 1690

The Admiralty of Rotterdam was founded in 1574 during the Dutch Revolt, when (after the Capture of Brielle) William I of Orange's supporters decided to pool their naval resources at Rotterdam. After a number of reorganisations seeking to foster cooperation between the admiralties, the structure of the five admiralties was determined and defined in a 1597 decision of the States-General of the Netherlands. Each admiralty had branches for equipping warships, protecting overseas trade and traffic on the sea and rivers, collecting taxes, and jurisdiction over loot and prize-setting. This situation remained in place until the admiralties were dissolved in 1795.

The Admiralty of Rotterdam or the Admiralty of the Meuse was the oldest of the admiralties. The admiralty was based in the Prinsenhof (Rotterdam), the former St Agnes convent at Botersloot. An artilleriehuis (arsenal) was built in the convent brewery, and an admiralty prison was built elsewhere in the complex. In 1644 the Prinsenhof was demolished to make way for the construction of Nieuwemarkt, with the admiralty moving to the northwest corner of Haringvliet. The artilleriehuis was, however, spared due to its noncentral position on the Prinsenhof site by the end of the Huibrug, but was demolished and rebuilt in 1759, probably using stone from the demolished late 16th-century frontage of the admiralty building. One of these stones shows the admiralty's arms, with the crossed anchors and an abbreviation of its motto Pugno Pro Patria ("I fight for the fatherland").

The admiralty's new 1644 building, the Admiraliteitshof (its name recalling that of the Prinsenhof), was an imposing classical building with a facade showing the coat of arms, and a square plan centered on a courtyard. It was demolished in 1884. (The remains of a gate with the coat of arms can be seen in the collection of the Rijksmuseum in Amsterdam.)

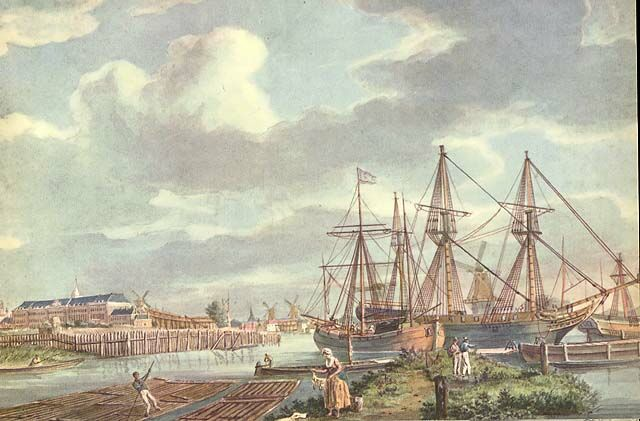
The 's-Landswerf in Rotterdam

From the end of the 16th century, the admiralty also owned the 's-Landswerf shipyard at the northeastern corner of the Nieuwe Haven. It was demolished and rebuilt on the same site in 1660, then extended in 1662 with a second arsenal accessed by a very wide entrance opposite the east gate. In the second half of the 17th century, the Nieuwe Haven was extended to the Buizengat harbor. Because of this extension, the 's-Landswerf shipyard was moved to the south bank of the Buizengat after 1688. In 1701, a part of the complex at the Groenendaal end was destroyed by fire. The rebuilding of the affected wing was commemorated with a foundation stone laid by Diderik Hogendorp. In the 18th century, the second arsenal closed and was modernised by the architect Jan Giudici. G. D. Wijckerheld Bisdom laid its first stone on 8 May 1783.

Resulting from all these extensions, a large rectangular building gradually took shape. In 1823, the second arsenal was refurbished for the marines. In 1846, the marine corps was disbanded, and in 1868 it returned. After the dissolution of the admiralties in 1795, the complex was known as the Naval Shipyard (Marinewerf). It closed in 1849, the last building becoming a state-run bonded warehouse in 1855.

The admiralty also had a ropewalk (lijnbaan) with associated buildings at the Lagendijk just outside the Oostpoort. It was used from 1697 to 1847 and was 265 m long by 10 m wide.

== Fleet-guardians (vlootvoogden) ==
Well-known fleet-guardians (Vlootvoogd) of the Rotterdam Admiralty include:

- Almonde, Philps van: luitenant-commandeur (1665); schout-bij-nacht (1673)
- Brakel, Jan van: viceadmiraal (1688)
- Callenburgh, Gerard: viceadmiraal (1692)
- Dorp, Phillips van: raadslid (1642)
- Ghent, Willem Joseph:
- Kerseboom, Laurens:
- Kortenaer, Egbert Bartholomeusz: luitenant-commandeur (1653); viceadmiraal (1659); luitenant-admiraal (1665)
- Liefde, Cornelis de:
- Liefde, Johan de: viceadmiraal (1666)
- Liefde, Pieter de:
- Neck, Jacob van: luitenant-admiraal (?)
- Nes, Aert Jansz van: schout-bij-nacht (1662); viceadmiraal (1665); luitenant-admiraal (1666)
- Nes, Cornelis Jansz van:
- Nes de jongere, Jan Jacobsz van:
- Nes de oudere, Jan Jacobsz van:
- Nes, Jan Jansz van: schout-bij-nacht (1666); viceadmiraal (1673)
- Schepers, Willem Bastiaensz: luitenant-admiraal (1692)
- Tromp, Cornelisz: luitenant-admiraal (1665)
- Tromp, Maarten Harpertsz: luitenant-admiraal (1637)
- Wassenaer Duivenvoorde, Jacob van: luitenant-admiraal (?)
- Wassenaer Obdam, Jacob van: luitenant-admiraal )1653)
- With, Witte de: vlaggen-kapitein (1622); viceadmiraal (1626)

== Battle of Texel ==
In the 1673 Battle of Texel, the last big battle of the Third Anglo-Dutch War, the Admiralty of Rotterdam provided the following ships and captains:

Ships of the line:
De Zeven Provinciën 80 (vlaggeschip der vloot, lieutenant-admiraal-generaal Michiel de Ruyter, vlaggekapiteins Gerard Callenburgh en Pieter de Liefde)
Delft 62 (Philips van Almonde)
Ridderschap 64 (Eland du Bois)
Voorzichtigheid 84 (Jan van Brakel)
Gelderland 63 (waarnemend schout-bij-nacht Cornelis de Liefde, dodelijk gewond)
Vrijheid 80 (viceadmiraal Jan Evertszoon de Liefde, gesneuveld)
Eendracht 72 (lieutenant-admiraal Aert Jansse van Nes)
Maagd van Dordrecht 68 (viceadmiraal Jan Jansse van Nes)
Dordrecht 44 (Frans van Nijdek)
Zeelandia 42 (Simon van Panhuis)
Schieland 58 (Adriaan Poort)
Wassenaer 59 (Barend Rees)
Frigates:
Schiedam 20 (Cornelis van der Hoevensoon)
Utrecht 34 (Jan Snellensoon)
Rotterdam 30 (Jacob Pieterszoon Swart)
Harderwijk 24 (MozesWichmansoon)
Adviesjachten:
Hoop 6 (Isaac Anteuniszoon van Anten)
Rotterdam 6 (Wijnand van Meurs)
Branders:
Sint Pieter (Gerrit Halfkaag)
Jisper Kerk 4 (Lens Harmenszoon)
Blackmoor 4 (Abraham van Koperen)
Maria 4 (Dirk de Munnik)
Eenhoorn (Willem de Rave)
Louise 4 (Jan Daniëlszoon van Rijn)
