= Roger Cuttance =

Captain Roger Cuttance was a Royal Navy officer who took a prominent role in the Anglo-Dutch Wars.

Cuttance initially commanded the 5th Rate Pearl (24 guns) 1651–2, but then took a prominent role in the first Dutch War (1652-4) when, in August 1652, he fought at the Battle of Plymouth under Sir George Ayscue. In 1653, he commanded the 4th Rate Sussex (46 guns) and fought at the Battle of Portland. At the Battle of the Gabbard, he was in Samuel Howett's division. He was also likely at the Battle of Scheveningen.

Cuttance sailed on the Tunis expedition in 1655, then commanded the 3rd Rate Langport. From 1656 to 1657 and again from 1659 to 1660, he commanded the 1st Rate Naseby, upon which Samuel Pepys sailed. He was flag captain for Edward Montagu, Earl of Sandwich, from 1660 to 1665 on the Naseby (later Royal Charles), then Royal James. At the Battle of Lowestoft, 13 June 1665 (the worst naval defeat in Dutch history), he commanded the 1st Rate Royal Prince (86 guns). When he was knighted on 1 July, according to Samuel Pepys it was on "board of the Prince, a vessel of 90 brasse ordnance (most whole canon) & happly the best ship in the world both for building & sailing: she had 700 men... after dinner came his Majestie (King Charles II) & the Duke & Prince Rupert: & here I saw him knight Capt Cuttance, for behaving himselfe so bravely in the late fight."

However, because Sir Roger Cuttance had been implicated, along with William Penn and the Earl of Sandwich, in the looting of the Indian prize (the Prize Goods Scandal), he was excluded from further command at sea shortly thereafter.

Sir Roger Cuttance died in 1669. His son, Henry Cuttance, was also by then a prominent naval officer.
