= Rochfort =

Surname

Rochfort is a surname. Notable people with the surname include:

- Alexander Rochfort KCB CMG (1850–1916), British Army officer who became Lieutenant Governor of Jersey
- Cecil Boyd-Rochfort CVO (1887–1983), British thoroughbred racehorse trainer, British flat racing Champion Trainer five times
- Charles Rochfort Scott (1790–1872), British Army officer who became Lieutenant Governor of Guernsey
- George Rochfort, 2nd Earl of Belvedere (1738–1814), an Anglo-Irish peer and politician
- George Boyd-Rochfort VC DL (1880–1940), Irish recipient of the Victoria Cross
- Horace William Noel Rochfort (1809–1891), Irish landowner and sheriff
- James Rochfort Maguire (1855–1925), British imperialist and Irish Nationalist politician and MP
- Robert Rochfort (1652–1727), attorney-general, judge and speaker of the Irish House of Commons
- Simon Rochfort (died 1224), English bishop of Meath in Ireland

== See also ==
- HMS Rochfort (1814), 74-gun third rate ship of the line of the Royal Navy, launched on 6 August 1814 at Milford Haven
- Rochfort Bridge, Alberta, hamlet in Alberta, Canada within Lac Ste. Anne County
- Rochfort Maguire (Died 29 June 1867), Royal Navy officer, Captain of HMS Plover 1852–1853 during the Franklin Search Expedition
- Rochefort (disambiguation)
