= HMS Royal Charles =

Two ships of the British Royal Navy have been named HMS Royal Charles, both after King Charles II.

- The first HMS Royal Charles (1660) was an 80-gun ship of the line, launched as Naseby for the Commonwealth Navy in 1655, renamed in 1660, and captured by the Dutch in the Raid on the Medway in 1667.
- The second HMS Royal Charles (1673) was a 100-gun ship of the line, launched in 1673, renamed Queen in 1693, rebuilt in 1715 and renamed Royal George, again rebuilt in 1756, renamed Royal Anne this time, and broken up in 1767. (Note that the "rebuilds" were likely new construction cannibalizing parts from the old ship.)
