= Johan de Liefde =

Dutch naval commander

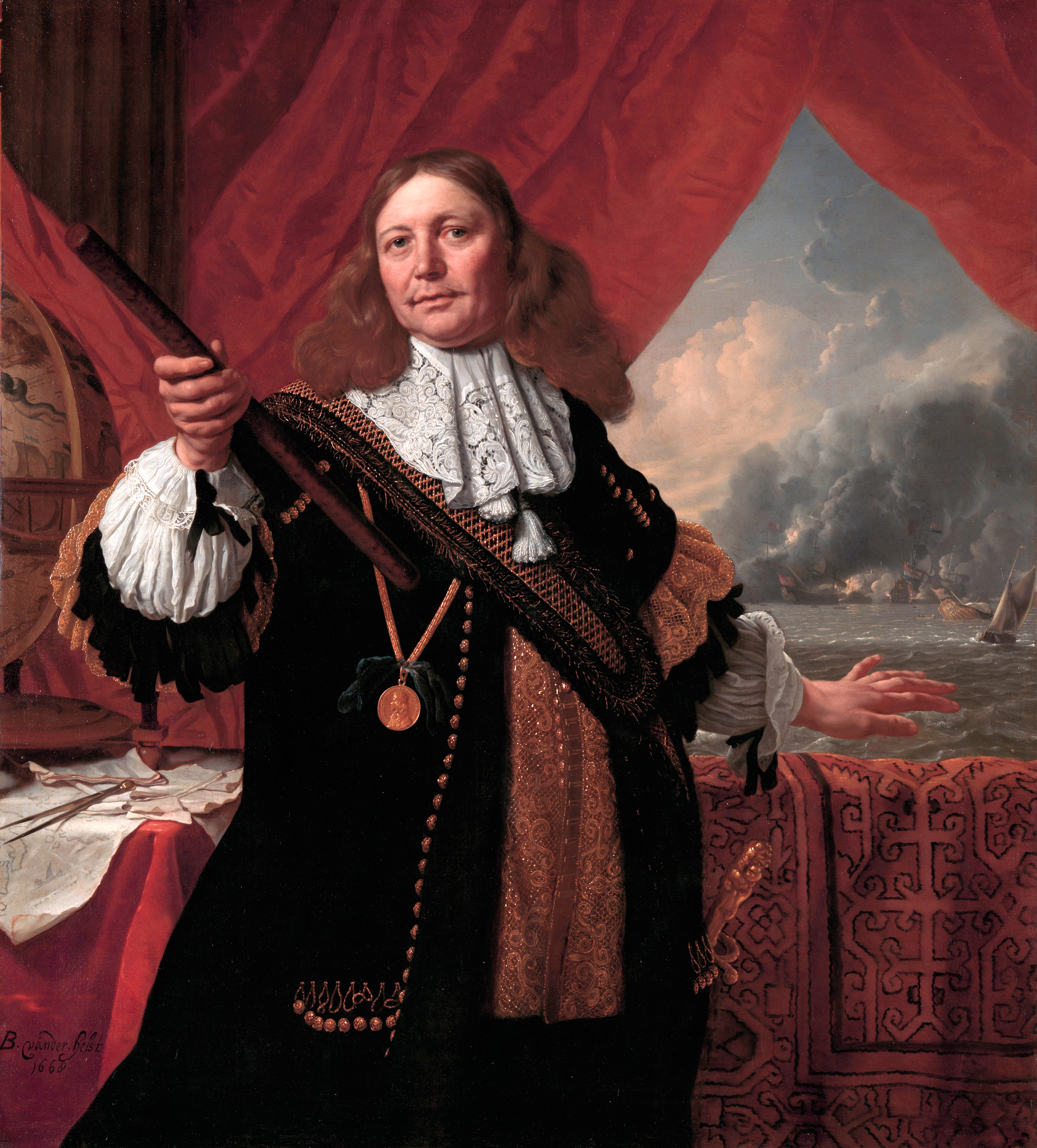
- De Liefde in 1668, by B. van der Helst
- Born: Johan Evertsen de Liefde; Unknown date, c. 1619; Rotterdam, Dutch Republic
- Died: 21 August 1673 (aged 54) near Texel, Dutch Republic
- Relatives: Cornelis de Liefde (brother)
- Military career
- Allegiance: Dutch Republic
- Branch: Admiralty of Rotterdam
- Years of service: 1644–1673
- Rank: Schout-bij-nacht
- Wars: First Anglo-Dutch War; Second Anglo-Dutch War; Third Anglo-Dutch War †

Johan Evertsen de Liefde (c. 1619 – 21 August 1673) was a Dutch naval commander who served as vice admiral of Holland and West Frisia within the Admiralty of Rotterdam. His elder brother, Cornelis de Liefde, was also a naval commander. Johan was killed in the battle of Texel.

== Naval career ==
De Liefde was born in Rotterdam, probably in 1619. On 16 June 1644, he became a captain with the Admiralty of the Maze based in Rotterdam. In the same year he sailed with the Dutch Mediterranean fleet combating the Barbary corsairs; his ship took a corsair. Shortly afterwards, De Liefde took a ship of the Dunkirkers.

=== First Anglo-Dutch War ===
During the First Anglo-Dutch War, De Liefde in 1652 again took service, first as captain of Jonas, a ship of the municipality fleet of the city, and subsequently as a commander of the admiralty vessel Dordrecht. In the battle of Dungeness, De Liefde functioned as temporary squadron subcommander, or commandeur, under Johan Evertsen, when Michiel de Ruyter replaced Witte de With during the latter's absence.

De Liefde, still in the rank of captain, was also present at the relief of Gdańsk on the ship Hollandia in 1656. On 4 November 1657, while part of the fleet of Lieutenant Admiral Jacob van Wassenaer Obdam blockaded Lisbon, De Liefde captured a ship of the Portuguese sugar fleet returning from Brazil, gaining him much personal wealth. In 1658, he fought in the battle of the Sound against the Swedes, on the Dordrecht.

=== Second Anglo-Dutch War ===
At the onset of the Second Anglo-Dutch War, on 29 January 1665, De Liefde, having returned to service the Admiralty of the Maze, replaced Aert Jansse van Nes as acting rear admiral. On 15 June, he was officially appointed in this rank and function. Shortly afterwards, using Klein Hollandia as his flagship, he fought in the battle of Lowestoft as second-in-command of the second squadron, commanded by Johan Evertsen.

On 24 February 1666, he became acting-vice admiral, again succeeding Van Nes. He distinguished himself fighting on the Ridderschap van Holland in the Four Days' Battle, especially on the fourth day. For his conduct, he received a golden chain from the States General. He was made a vice admiral on 5 September.

=== Third Anglo-Dutch War ===
He participated in all major battles of the Third Anglo-Dutch War, and was mortally wounded in the last, the battle of Texel. De Liefde was given a grave memorial in the Great Church of Rotterdam.
