= William Berkeley (Royal Navy officer) =

Royal Navy officer

Vice-Admiral The Honourable Sir William Berkeley
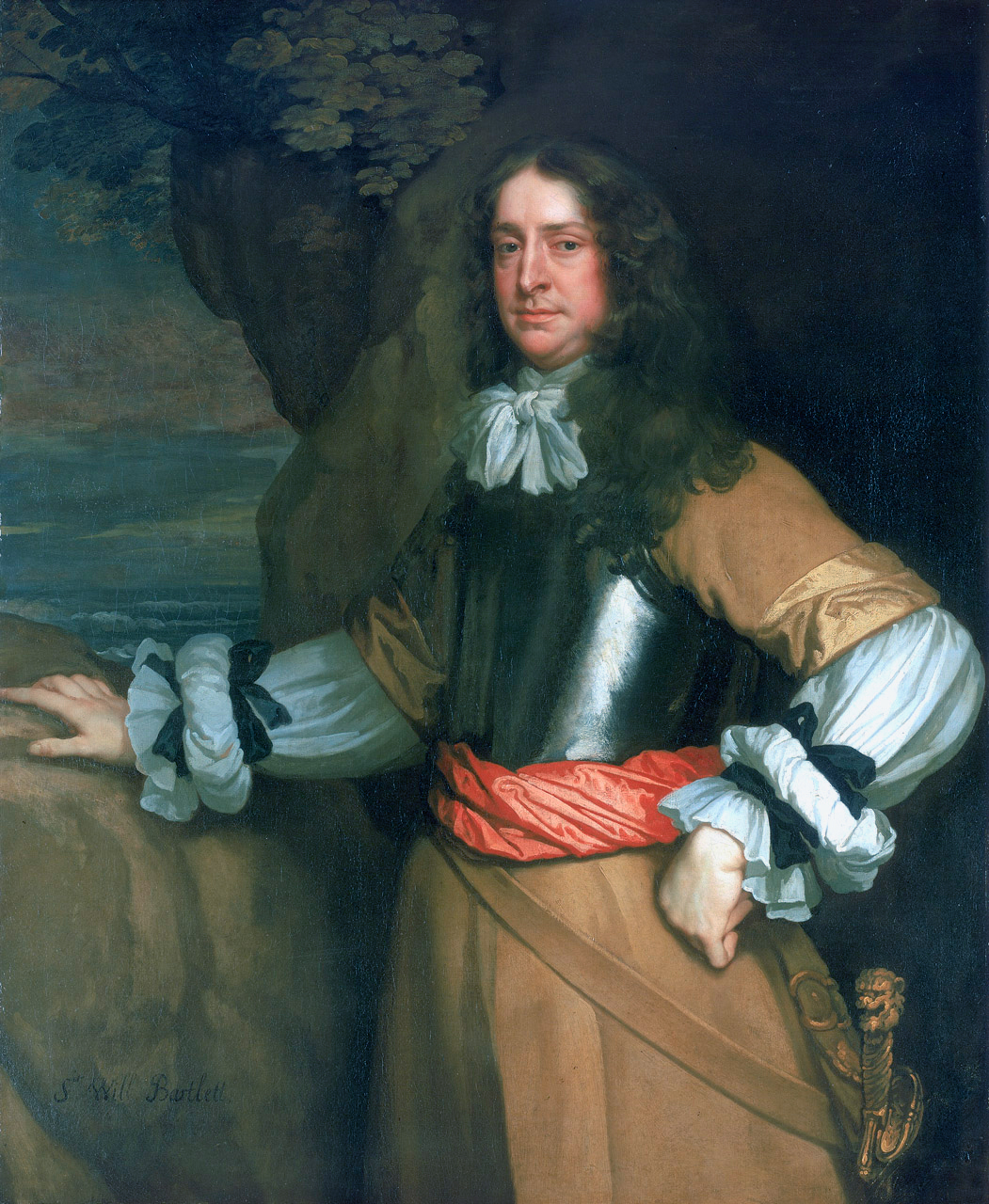
- Portrait by Sir Peter Lely, 1665–1666
- Born: 1639
- Died: 1 June 1666 (aged 26–27); Aboard HMS Swiftsure during the Four Days' Battle
- Burial place: Westminster Abbey
- Relatives: Charles Berkeley, 2nd Viscount Fitzhardinge (father); Charles Berkeley, 1st Earl of Falmouth (brother)
- Military career
- Allegiance: Kingdom of England
- Branch: Royal Navy
- Service years: Finished 1666
- Rank: Vice-Admiral of the Blue
- Commands: HMS Assistance; HMS Bonaventure; HMS Bristol; HMS Resolution
- Conflicts: Second Anglo-Dutch War Battle of Lowestoft Four Days' Battle †

Vice-Admiral Sir William Berkeley (1639 – 1 June 1666) was a Royal Navy officer who saw service during the Second Anglo-Dutch War, rising to the rank of vice-admiral.

Berkeley was born into a noble family, one of the younger sons of a courtier of King Charles II, and a younger brother of one of the King's favourites. He joined the Royal Navy and enjoyed a meteoric rise owing to these important sources of patronage, something he himself acknowledged. After service in the Mediterranean, and time spent commanding his own ships, he was advanced to flag rank and joined the Royal fleets assembling for battle during the Second Anglo-Dutch War. He was a junior flag officer at the Battle of Lowestoft in 1665, during which his brother was killed. Caustic comments were made about his conduct, including by the poet and satirist Andrew Marvell.

Determined to answer his critics, Berkeley, by now promoted to vice-admiral and leading the van at the Four Days' Battle, took his ship into the thick of the fighting, and was surrounded by Dutch ships. Cut off from support he fought fiercely, but his ship was overwhelmed and captured, with Berkeley being killed in the action. His body was taken to the Netherlands and embalmed, before being returned to England and interred in Westminster Abbey. Accusations of cowardice pursued him even after his death, but later biographies have been more sympathetic.

== Family and early life ==
Berkeley was born in 1639, the third son of Charles Berkeley, and his wife Penelope Godolphin. Charles Berkeley was the treasurer of the household to King Charles II, and had powerful political connections which would ensure the rapid rise of his sons to positions of prominence. William's elder brother, Charles, was also a prominent courtier, who used his influence to promote William's rise. William entered the navy, becoming lieutenant of HMS Swiftsure on 4 April 1661 and serving aboard her until April 1662. He benefited from his relationship to his brother, one of the closest friends of King Charles II and the Lord High Admiral, James, Duke of York. Rapid promotion followed, with Berkeley being appointed captain of HMS Assistance that April. He served in command of her until August 1662, when he moved to HMS Bonaventure, and later had the commands of HMS Bristol and HMS Resolution.

Berkeley attracted the support of another powerful patron in the form of Admiral Sir John Lawson, the commander of the Mediterranean Fleet during Berkeley's service there from 1661 to 1664. Berkeley had commanded Bristol in Sir John's squadron in an attempt to persuade the Dey of Algiers, Ismail Pasha, to stop attacking English ships. Berkeley's connections culminated in a knighthood on 12 October 1664 and his appointment as rear-admiral of the red squadron, during the Second Anglo-Dutch War.

== Second Anglo-Dutch War ==
Berkeley raised his flag aboard his old ship, HMS Swiftsure, and joined the fleet assembling for the 1665 campaign. He saw action at the Battle of Lowestoft on 3 June 1665 as one of the junior flag officers. Reports of his actions during the battle were confused and contradictory, some accounts suggesting that he had taken a squadron of six ships and pursued nine Dutch vessels, others stating that he had abandoned the fight after the death of his brother, Charles.^{[a]} Poet Andrew Marvell added a critical verse suggesting the latter view was correct in his 1666 poem 'The Second Advice to a Painter':

Berkeley had heard it soon, and thought not good
To venture more of royal Harding's blood …
With his whole squadron straight away he bore,
And, like good boy, promised to fight no more.

Berkeley was supported by the Duke of York, who appointed him Vice-admiral of the White, and William succeeded his dead brother as lieutenant-governor of Portsmouth later in 1665. Public scepticism over his actions persisted, however, with Samuel Pepys commenting that "it is strange to see how people do already slight Sir Wm. Berkeley ... who three months since was the delight of the Court". Berkeley's reputation was further tarnished when he was implicated in the irregular plundering of prize goods from captured Dutch merchantmen, and accused of having abandoned an action with the Dutch ship Luipaard in discreditable circumstances on 21 August 1665.

== Death ==
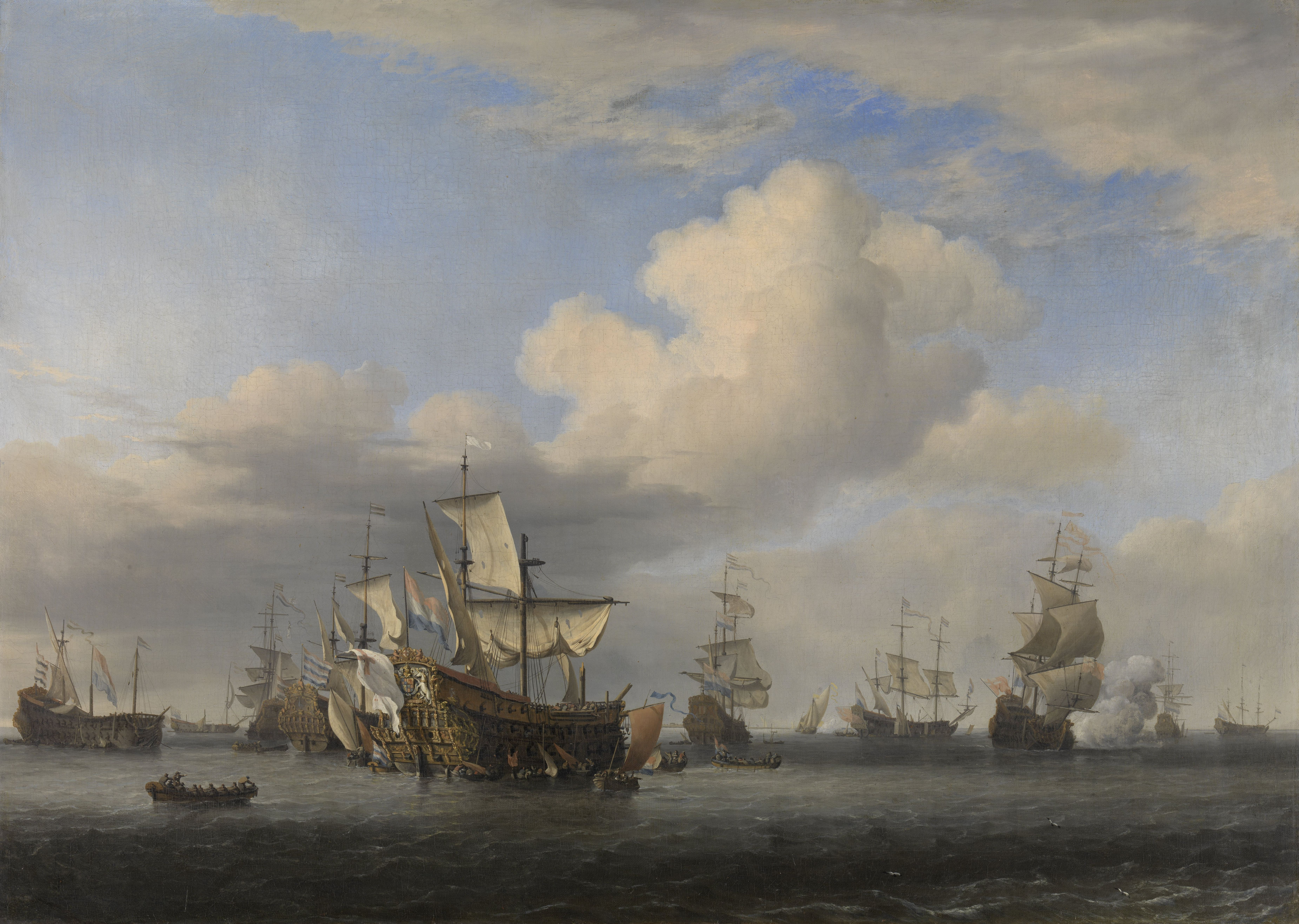
Captured English ships, including HMS Swiftsure, being sailed away by the Dutch after the battle, by Willem van de Velde the Younger

With his conduct called into question, Berkeley resolved to answer his critics by distinguishing himself in the 1666 campaign. He had by now been appointed vice-admiral of the blue and been given command of the van of the English fleet which sailed to engage the Dutch at the Four Days' Battle. Flying his flag in Swiftsure again, he led the van of the fleet on the first day of the battle, 1 June 1666. He outran his squadron, sailed into the midst of the Dutch fleet and was surrounded by enemy ships. After a fierce battle he was killed and Swiftsure captured. He was reported as having fought to the end, until when almost alone on the quarter-deck, he was hit by a musket-ball in the throat. He staggered into the captain's cabin and was found by the Dutch lying dead on the table.

His body was carried to Zeeland and embalmed by Frederik Ruysch, before being placed on public display, in a large sugar chest, in the Grote Kerk in The Hague for a time. It was returned to England in August and interred in Westminster Abbey, where a monument to his memory was raised.

== Legacy ==
Berkeley died unmarried, a proposal he had made to Sir John Lawson's daughter in 1665 having been rejected. Public opinion was that he had died gallantly, but Marvell presented an alternative viewpoint in 'The Third Advice to a Painter':

And if the thing were true, yet paint it not,
How Berkeley (as he long deserved) was shot,
Though others that survey'd the corpse so clear
Say he was only petrified with fear.

Berkeley's biographer, J. D. Davies, wrote after examining his letters that Berkeley appears as a 'lively, friendly young man, fully aware of his dependence on the patronage of others, supportive of and loving towards his family, and genuinely enthusiastic to make a success of his chosen career', quoting a letter from William to Charles Berkeley in June 1663:

I must assure you I think there is no so beggarly a trade as this if people serve truly and honestly, as I am resolved I will do, although I am never worth six pence. All my hope is on my dearest brother's kindness.

== Notes ==
a. Charles Berkeley was a courtier, not a naval officer, but had volunteered for service with the Royal fleet. He was killed by a cannon shot during the battle.
