= Battle of Ronas Voe =

1674 naval engagement during the Third Anglo-Dutch War

- Part of the Third Anglo-Dutch War
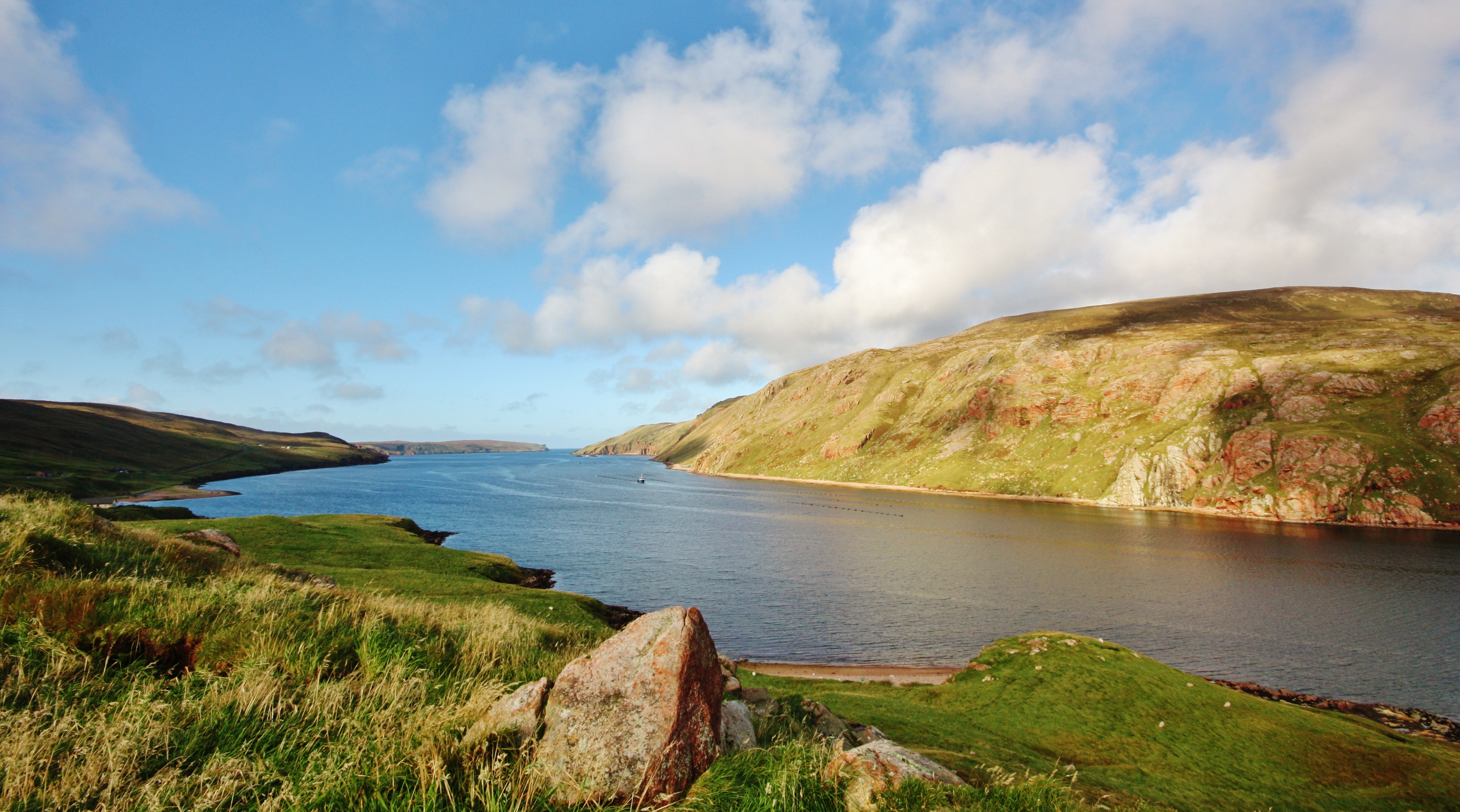
- Modern-day view of Ronas Voe
Date	14 March [O.S. 4 March] 1674
Location	Ronas Voe, Shetland 60°30′25″N 1°26′48″W
Result	English victory

Belligerents
Dutch East India Company	Kingdom of England

Commanders and leaders
(Dutch East India Company) Jacob Martens Cloet; (Dutch East India Company) Unknown VOC private army captain	(Kingdom of England) Arthur Herbert; (Kingdom of England) John Wetwang; (Kingdom of England) Richard Carter

Strength
1 East Indiaman	1 3rd-rate ship-of-the-line; 2 4th-rate ships-of-the-line

Casualties and losses
Up to 300 dead; Unknown casualties; 1 ship captured	Unknown; 0 ships
- Ronas Voe in relation to the Netherlands and England Ronas Voe (Shetland)

The Battle of Ronas Voe was a naval engagement between the English Royal Navy and the Dutch East India ship Wapen van Rotterdam on 14 March 1674 in Ronas Voe, Shetland as part of the Third Anglo-Dutch War. Having occurred 23 days after the signing of the Treaty of Westminster, it is likely to have been the final battle of the Third Anglo-Dutch War.

Shortly after embarking on a journey towards the Dutch East Indies with trade goods and a company of soldiers, extreme weather conditions caused Wapen van Rotterdam to lose its masts and rudder and it was forced to take shelter in Ronas Voe for a number of months. A whistleblower in Shetland informed the English authorities of the ship's presence, and in response three Royal Navy men-of-war and a dogger were dispatched to capture the ship. After a short battle, the ship was captured and taken back to England as a prize of war.

An unknown number of up to 300 of the ship's crew were killed in the battle and were buried nearby in Heylor. A modern memorial to the Dutch crew is erected where they are believed to be buried, bearing the inscription "The Hollanders' Graves".

== Background ==
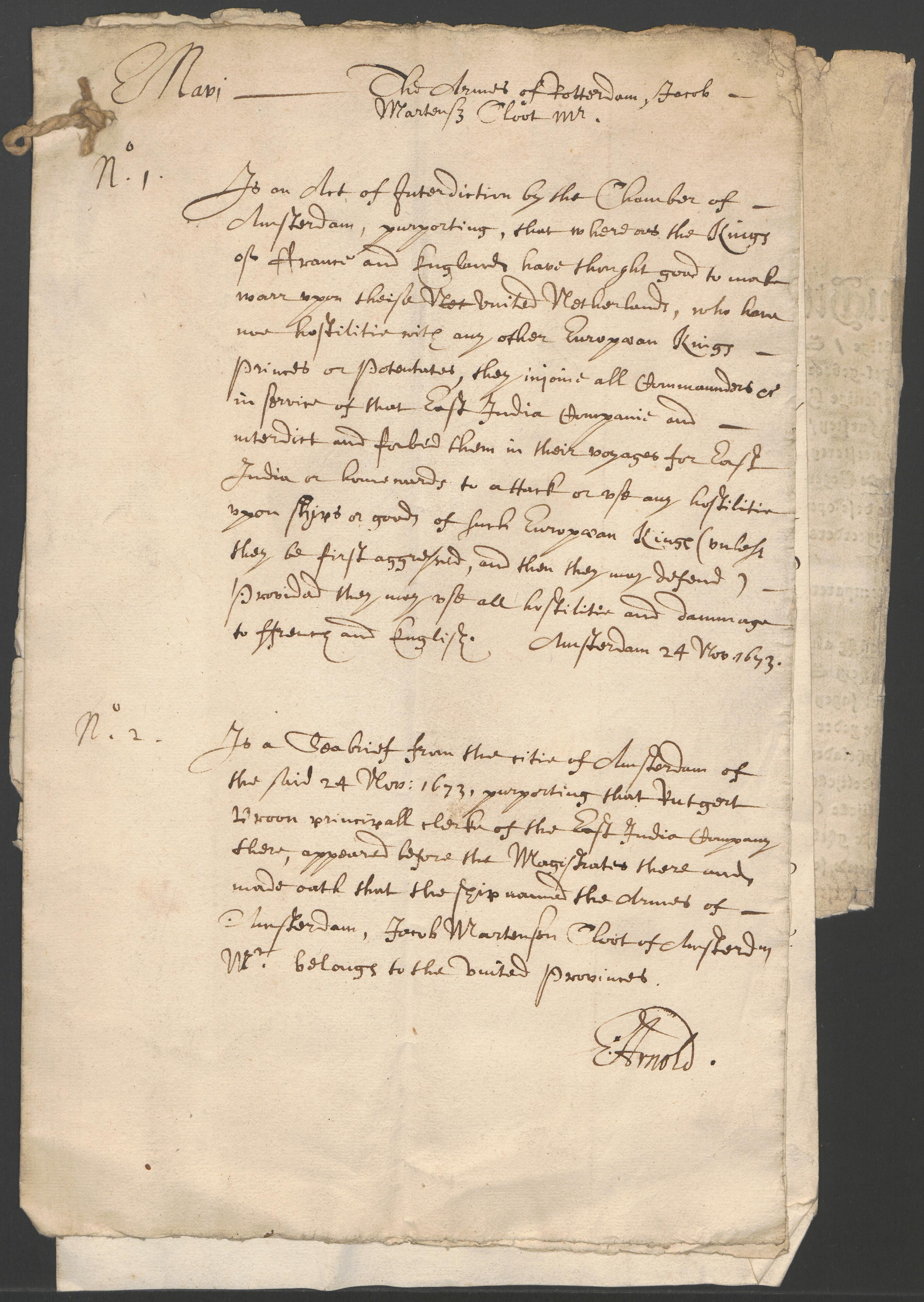
An English language letter dated 24 November 1673, taken from aboard Wapen van Rotterdam, the first part of which explains the situation of the war which the ship may have been unfamiliar with upon their return from Batavia. It gives permission to the ship's crew to "use all hoſtilitie and dammage to French and Engliſh."

Wapen van Rotterdam (Note: "Wapen van Rotterdam" is Dutch for "Coat of arms of Rotterdam".) was an East Indiaman with a capacity of 1,124 tons and between 60 and 70 guns. On 16 December 1673, it departed the Texel bound for the Dutch East Indies with both trade goods and a company of soldiers from the Dutch East India Company's private army, along with an army captain. The ship itself was captained by Jacob Martens Cloet.

To avoid conflict with the English (with whom, due to the Third Anglo-Dutch War, the Dutch were at war), rather than passing through the English Channel, the ship was directed northwards where the plan would be to sail around the north of the British Isles (known as "going north about", which was commonly practised by Dutch East India ships at that time), before heading southwards again. Due to the extreme weather conditions in its journey northwards, the ship lost its masts and rudder, and southerly winds prevented the ship from being able to pass through either the Pentland Firth or the Fair Isle Channel, so the ship was (probably with considerable difficulty) taken into Ronas Voe in the north-west of Northmavine, Mainland, Shetland to shelter until the weather improved, and to allow the ship to be repaired. The voe (Shetland dialect for an inlet, firth or fjord) forms a crescent shape around Ronas Hill, which would have allowed the ship to lie sheltered regardless of the direction of the wind. A combination of prevailing southerly winds, and, presumably, a scarcity of suitable wood available in Shetland at that time to replace its masts (Note: Shetland supports only a small number of trees as of June 2014, although since the 1950s the number of trees has gradually increased) prevented the ship from continuing its journey, and as such it remained in Ronas Voe until March 1674.

During their stay, the crew of the ship would have most likely traded Dutch goods such as Hollands gin and tobacco (and perhaps also goods on the ship originally destined for the Dutch East Indies) with the Shetlanders, in exchange for local foodstuffs available at that time, such as kale, meal and mutton – either fresh or reestit. The Shetlanders probably would have had quite a lot in common with the Dutch. The native language of the local Shetlanders at that time would have been Norn, though English would have been understood and used fluently by most. Many Shetlanders (of both the affluent and Commoners) were also fluent in Dutch, despite never having never left Shetland, due to the amount of trade done by Dutch ships in Shetland's ports.

From 1603, the Kingdoms of England, Ireland and Scotland had all shared the same monarch with the Union of the Crowns, who by 1674 was Charles II. As such, Scotland was actively involved in the Third Anglo-Dutch War, despite not being included in the conflict's name. Shetland, being a part of the Kingdom of Scotland, was therefore at war with the Dutch, however the local Shetland residents of Heylor and adjacent areas in direct contact with the Dutch may not have been aware of the conflict, and would not have considered the visitors as "enemies". A letter must have been sent by someone with an understanding of the political situation (most likely a laird, minister, merchant, or some other member of the gentry in Shetland) to inform the authorities of the Dutch ship's presence, and that it could not proceed due to it losing its masts and rudder. As a result, a total of four Royal Navy ships – HMS Cambridge, captained by Arthur Herbert (later the Earl of Torrington); HMS Newcastle, captained by John Wetwang (later Sir John Wetwang); HMS Crown, captained by Richard Carter; and a dogger (the Dove, captained by Abraham Hyatt) – were ordered to set sail for Shetland and to capture the ship.

== Call to arms ==
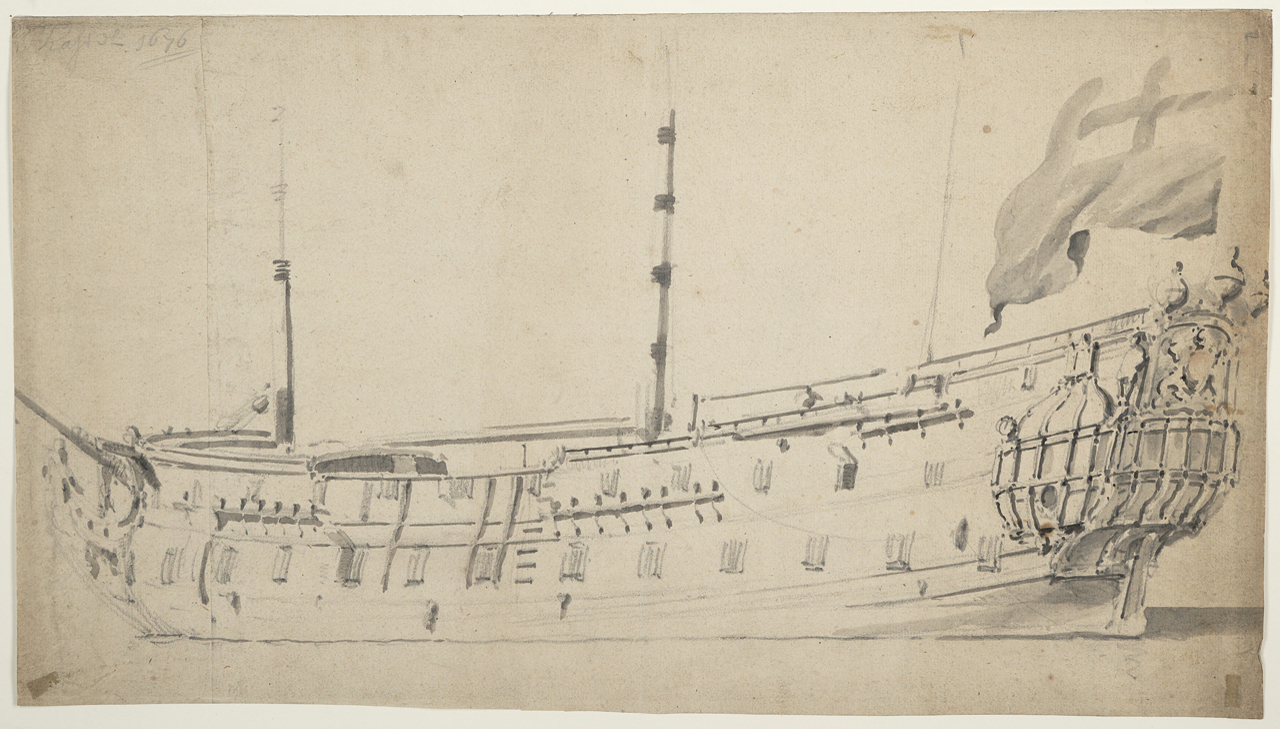
HMS Newcastle, one of the English men-of-war sent to capture Wapen van Rotterdam. Drawing by Willem van de Velde, 1676.

Captain Herbert (Cambridge) was the first to receive his orders in a letter sent 21 February [O.S. 11 February] 1674 by the Royal Navy's Chief Secretary to the Admiralty Samuel Pepys. He stated the orders were "at the desire of the Royal Highness", and stressed that the orders were to be carried out swiftly, as the Treaty of Westminster concluding the war was expected to be published within eight days, and any subsequent hostilities were to last no longer than twelve days. The Treaty of Westminster had in fact been signed two days prior to this letter being sent, and was ratified in England the day before the letter was sent.

The following day letters were sent to both Captains Wetwang (Newcastle) and Carter (Crown) enclosing the same orders. Pepys also wrote again to Captain Herbert (Cambridge) to convey he had arranged for a pilot knowledgeable of Shetland's coast to be sent to him, as well as to inform him that Crown and Dove would accompany his ship.

On 25 February [O.S. 15 February] Captain Herbert (Cambridge) wrote to Pepys to inform him that neither the pilot nor Dove had yet arrived. Pepys replied on 28 February [O.S. 18 February] to say he had sent instruction to hasten the pilot, and had enquired into Dove's delay.

On 3 March [O.S. 21 February] Captain Taylor stationed at Harwich wrote to Pepys to inform him that Cambridge and Crown had passed by on their way to Shetland. The same day, Pepys replied to a letter from Carter (Crown) to inform him that his five weeks' supply of victuals were enough to support his crew until their return from Shetland.

On 6 March [O.S. 24 February], Dove was wrecked on the coast of Northumberland on the journey northwards, leaving the three remaining ships to continue towards Shetland.

== Battle ==
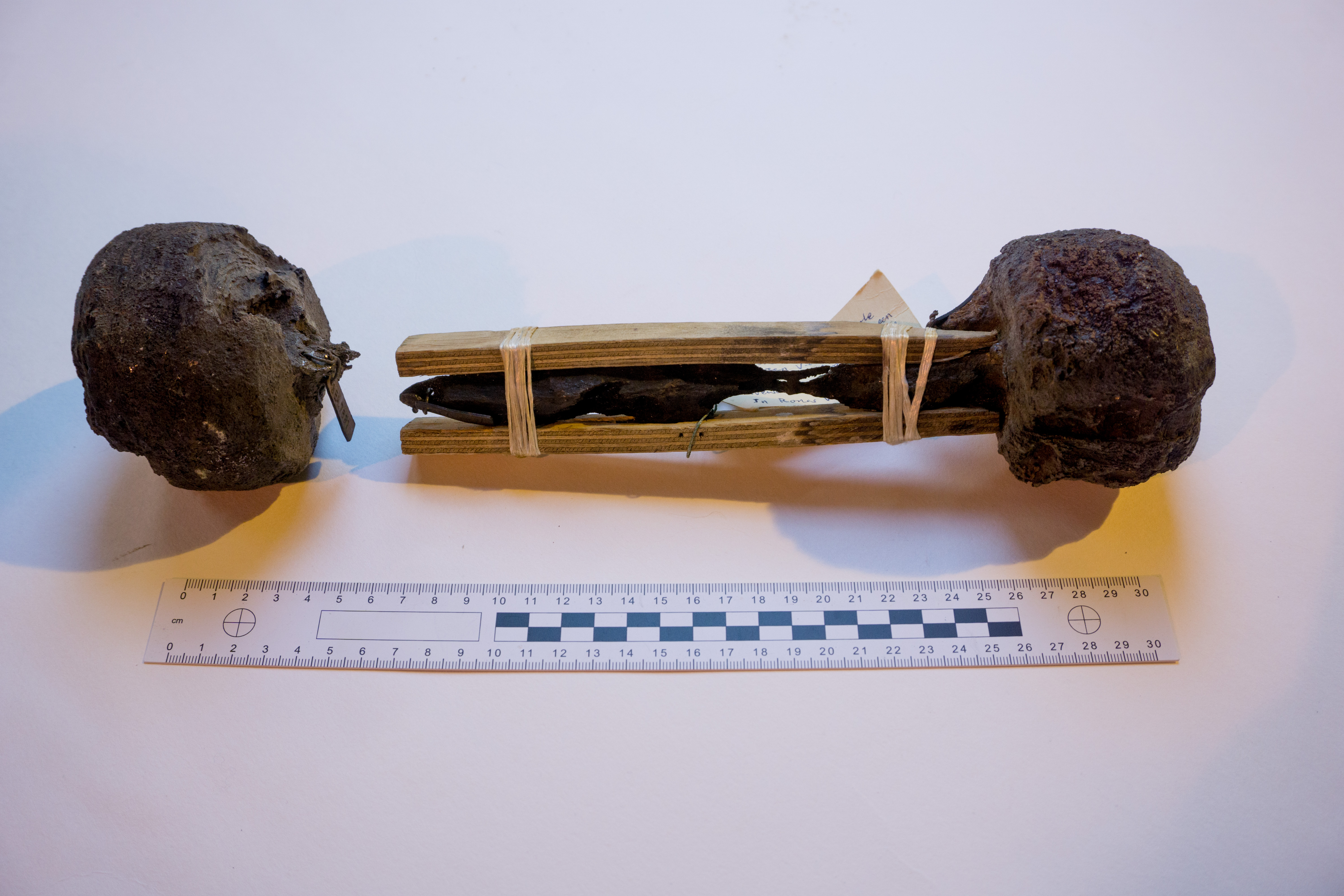
Bar shot fired during the Battle of Ronas Voe, discovered by Jack Edwardson in Heylor. Held by Shetland Museum & Archives.

The battle is commonly reported to have occurred in February 1674, however the only known extant contemporary report of the battle indicates that it occurred on 14 March [O.S. 4 March] 1674. This was one day after Pepys' original twenty day deadline for the completion of his orders sent to Captain Herbert, and 23 days after the signing of the Treaty of Westminster.

Upon their arrival, Cambridge, Newcastle and Crown entered Ronas Voe, where a short, one-sided battle ensued. While a single East Indiaman might have stood a chance, however small, against three much more manoeuvrable men-of-war on open seas, in the confined space of Ronas Voe and most likely still without replacement masts (evidenced by the fact the ship had not left Ronas Voe), Wapen van Rotterdam was completely outmatched.

It is recorded that Newcastle captured Wapen van Rotterdam, and it was taken back to England as a prize of war. A contemporary Dutch newspaper reported that while 400 crew were originally on board Wapen van Rotterdam, later only 100 prisoners were being transported by Crown, suggesting up to 300 crew may have been killed, although additional prisoners might have been transported on the other English ships. Those killed in the battle were buried nearby in Heylor. Both Cloet and the army captain survived the battle and were taken back to England with the rest of the surviving crew.

== Aftermath ==
Crown took aboard one hundred Dutch prisoners. When the ship returned to England, it experienced extremely bad weather (in which it was reported that 10 valuable ships between Great Yarmouth and Winterton-on-Sea had to be stranded, some of which were destroyed) and was unable to land before it reached Dover on 29 March [O.S. 19 March] 1674. Samuel Pepys wrote to Captain Carter (Crown) on 31 March [O.S. 21 March], telling him "His Majesty and his Royal Highness are well pleased with his account of the good success of the Cambridge and Newcastle." The ships returned to the Downs by 3 April [O.S. 24 March]. Pepys wrote to Captain Herbert (Cambridge) on 4 April [O.S. 25 March] and passed on that the Lords had commented, "Long may the civility which you mention of the Dutch to his Majesty's ships continue."

Captain Wetwang directed the Dutch ship to Harwich on 7 April [O.S. 28 March] en route to the River Thames. The remaining Dutch crew were put ashore in Harwich, after which Cloet and the army captain set sail back to the Dutch Republic in a packet boat. Before departing, the Dutch captains valued Wapen van Rotterdam (and presumably also the trade goods on board) at approximately £50,000 – equivalent to £8,300,000 in 2025. In June the same year, the Lord Privy Seal Arthur Annesley asked the Principal Commissioners of Prizes and the Lord High Treasurer to award Captain Wetwang £500 – equivalent to £83,000 in 2025 – for his capture of the ship and its safe return to the Thames. This prize was to be funded from the sale of the goods aboard the ship, or if the value raised was insufficient to fund this prize, the Privy Seal instructed the Lord High Treasurer "to find out some other proper way for payment thereof, as a free gift."

Letters carried by Wapen van Rotterdam were captured, and still survive in the English admiralty archives. They were partly published in 2014.

=== Goods put up for sale ===
On 24 May [O.S. 14 May] 1674, many of the goods aboard the ship were put up for sale at the East India House, City of London:

Item	Quantity		Notes	Maximum total sale value (Note: The value of the goods listed is the item's maximum sale value, not including advances that were offered to those buying all the goods in a single lot.)				Source
Item	English	Metric equivalent (approx)	Notes	1674 value			Equivalent value (2025)	Source
Item	English	Metric equivalent (approx)	Notes	£	s	d	Equivalent value (2025)	Source
Scarlet	229 yards	209 Metres		148	17	0	£24,586	
Crimson cloth	234 yards	214 metres		140	8	0	£23,191	
Crimson cloth	209 yards	191 metres		83	12	0	£13,809	
Red cloth	223 yards	204 metres		78	1	0	£12,892	
Scarlet and crimson cloth	41 yards	37 metres	3 remnants	20	10	0	£3,386	
Amber	2 small cases							
Mum brown Hollands beer	180 barrels	28,281 Litres	Sale programme states "or what it is"	120	0	0	£19,821	
Spanish wine	10 leadgers and 1 puncheon		Sale programme states "or what it is"					
Rhenish wine	8 leadgers							
Vinegar	21 puncheons	6,636 – 6,720 litres		84	0	0	£13,875	
Rack	5 rundlets	340 litres		6	0	0	£991	
Butter	4 firkins	100 Kilograms	In barrels of pickle	4	12	0	£760	
Oil	15 rundlets	1,020 litres		27	0	0	£4,460	
Malay language New Testaments	220			11	0	0	£1,817	
Small Books	6 bundles			6	13	8	£1,103	
Prayer books	283			6	13	8	£1,103	
Rushes	150 bundles			1	17	6	£311	
Prunes	10 drum hogsheads and 1 butt							
Glue	2 tierces	316–320 litres						
Spruce beer	40 gallons	185 litres	Among 3 rundlets	5	0	0	£826	
Isinglass	2 cases							
Round shaves	47			1	11	4	£259	
Howells	42			1	1	0	£173	
Percers	192			2	8	0	£396	
Gilt leaf	5 boxes			1	0	0	£165	
Iron plates	100							
Tew irons cast for bellows	20							
Beak irons for smiths	5							
Pairs of wooden screws	1			1	0	0	£165	
Copper Kettles	23							
Copper plates or bottoms	21							
Pairs of pinchers	75			0	18	9	£155	
Drills	2			0	5	0	£41	
Small Brushes	100			0	12	6	£104	
Carpenters' brass compasses	156		With iron points	6	10	0	£1,074	
Iron collars or turners	3			0	9	0	£74	
Handvices	36			1	16	0	£297	
Brass cocks	30			1	10	0	£248	
Small cabin Bells	30							
Sea compasses	49			6	2	6	£1,013	
Square Glasses for compasses	34			0	4	3	£35	
Cards for compasses	72			1	4	0	£198	
Round glasses for compasses	18			0	1	6	£13	
Half-hour glasses	46			0	15	4	£127	
Cardis	1 chest			1	11	0	£256	
Wormwood	1 chest			1	11	0	£256	
Roots	1 cask		In sand	1	11	0	£256	
Empty cases lined with sheet lead	4			1	11	0	£256	

=== Remaining goods ===
Those goods still remaining on the ship following the sale, along with the sails and cables not offered for sale were catalogued and stored at his Majesties stores in Woolwich Dockyard by 2 July [O.S. 22 June] 1674:

Goods
Item	Quantity	Notes	Total estimated weight				Source
Item	Quantity	Notes	English			Metric kg	Source
Item	Quantity	Notes	cwt	qr	lbs	Metric kg	Source
Nails	98 Barrels		601	0	14	30,539	
Holland's duck canvas	82 bales	17,712 Yards (16.2 kilometres)					
Fine canvas	5 bales	1,292 yards (1,181 metres)					
Beef	1 puncheon	Damaged					
Butter	9 casks		31	1	10	1,592	
Butter	4 small casks		0	0	280	127	
Pork	32 casks		105	1	20	5,356	
Rosin	40 barrels		153	0	16	7,780	
Pitch	25 barrels		90	2	21	4,607	
Tar	77 barrels		281	0	4	14,277	
Tallow	8 casks		47	2	13	2,419	
Grout	25 Hogsheads						
Grout & pea gravel mix	13 hogsheads						
Grout	13 butts, pipes and puncheons						
Rusk	53 casks						
Pea gravel	Twelve hogsheads						
Oil	4 Rundlets						
Twine			10	3	12	552	
Sail needles	2400						
Herbs	3 chests	Damaged					
Hogs' Bristles	2 casks		10	1	13	527	
Swines	2 casks						
Leather	100 backs						
Grindstones	39						
Blacking	255 barrels						
Housing and marlings		Damaged, 1,345 small lines	13	1	7	676	
Ram block with 4 brass Sheaves	1	Containing 4 Fathoms 11 Inches (7.59 metres)					
Ram block with lignum vities	11	Containing 21 fathoms 10 inches (38.66 metres)					
Block with ash sheaves	63	Containing 67 fathoms (122.5 metres)					
Anchors	2		55	1	2	2,808	
Anchor	1		6	0	24	316	
Grapnels	2		1	1	10	68	
Flour	2 casks		3	0	23	163	
Small cordage	197 coils		152	1	16	7,742	

Sails
Sail	Size				Material	Condition	Source
Sail	English		Metric		Material	Condition	Source
Sail	Width (cloths)	Depth (yards)	Width (metres) (Note: Width given to the nearest metre)	Depth (metres) (Note: Depth given to the nearest 25cm)	Material	Condition	Source
Bonnet	29	1 ¾	53	1.5	Duck canvas	½ worn	
Topsail	21	14	38	12.75	Duck canvas		
Mizzen sail	12	14	22	12.75	Duck canvas		
Spritsail	22	5 ½	40	5		½ worn	
Foresail	29	8 ¼	53	7.5		20 yards damaged	
Main canvas	33	10 ¼	60	9.25			
Studding sail	7	16 ¾	13	15.25	Small canvas		
Mainsail (piece)	15	9	27	8.25		⅓ worn	
Mizzen topsail	13	7 ¾	24	7	Small canvas		
Boat sail	5 ½	9 ½	10	8.75	Duck canvas		
Boat sail	5	8	9	7.25	Small canvas		
Mizzen sail	11 ½	17	21	15.5	Duck canvas	½ worn	
Topsail	15	8	27	7.25			
Topsail	12	7 ¾	22	7	Small canvas		
Bonnet	29	1 ¾	53	1.5	Duck canvas		
Boat sail	2 ½	7	5	6.5	Duck canvas		
Course sail	24	8 ½	44	7.75	Duck canvas	½ worn	
Staysail	9 ½	10	17	9.25	Duck canvas	New	
Bonnet	29	2	53	1.75	Duck canvas	New	
Topsail	15	9	27	8.25	Small cloth	¾ worn	
Course sail (piece)	5	8	9	7.25	Duck canvas		
Topsail	13	7 ½	24	6.75	½ small canvas		
Awning (piece)	5	11	9	10	Duck canvas	½ worn	

Cables
Item	Size				Notes	Source
Item	English		Metric		Notes	Source
Item	Circumference (Inches)	Length (Fathoms)	Diameter (mm)	Length (m)	Notes	Source
Shroud hawser	8	92	65	168		
Shroud hawser	8	66	65	121		
Shroud hawser	8	93	65	170		
Shroud hawser	7 ½	93	61	170		
Shroud hawser	8	91	65	166		
Cable	9 ¾	88	79	161		
Cable	9 ½	87	77	159		
Cable	11	87	89	159		
Cable	11	89	89	163		
Cable	10 ½	90	85	165		
Cable	11 ½	86	93	157		
Cable	8 ¾	87	71	159		
Cable	8 ¾	90	71	165		
Cable	8 ½	90	69	165		
Cable	8 ½	93	69	170		
Cable	8 ½	89	69	163		
Cable	9	94	73	172		
Cable	9	89	73	163		
Cable	10 ½	9	85	16		
Cable	7 ½	174	61	318		
Cable	9	27	73	49		
Cable	7 ½	86	61	157		
Cable	8	87	65	159		
Cable	12	86	97	157		
Cable	11	94	89	172		
Cable	13	90	105	165		
Cable	13	90	105	165		
Cable	15	87	121	159		
Cable	17	86	137	157		
Cable	15 ½	90	125	165		
Cable	16	47	129	86		
Cable	16 ½	88	133	161		
Cable	20	89	162	163		
Cable	20	89	162	163		
Rope with 4 strands	5 ½	53	44	97		
Tacks					Two pieces	
Warp	5	69	40	126		
Shot	21	265	170	485	⅓ worn	
Tack						
Tack					½ worn	

== Fate of Wapen van Rotterdam ==
Wapen van Rotterdam was renamed HMS Arms of Rotterdam and was refitted as an unarmed hulk. In 1703 Arms of Rotterdam was broken down in Chatham.

== The Hollanders' Graves ==
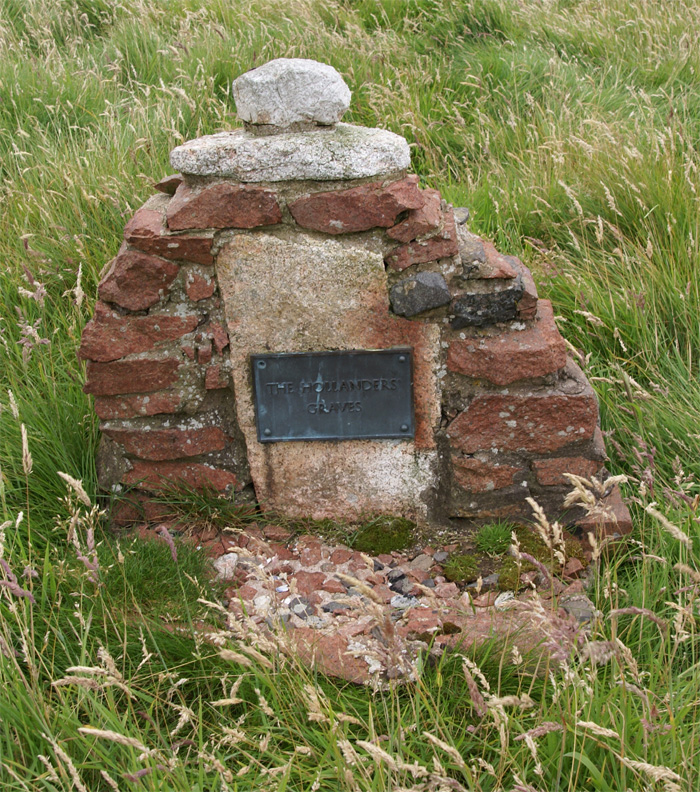
The Hollanders' Graves

The site where the bodies of those killed in the battle were buried is known as the Hollanders' Knowe, and the site is marked by a small granite cairn with a plaque that reads "The Hollanders' Graves". These are likely to be the first War graves recorded in Shetland.

== Sources ==
- Brand, John (1809) [1701]. Pinkerton, John (ed.). A brief description of Orkney, Zetland, Pightland Firth, and Caithness, etc (In Pinkerton, John, Ed. A general collection of the best and most interesting voyages and travels). London. pp. 767. OCLC 1041608289. OL 13997155M. "Engliſh is the common language among them, yet many of the people ſpeak Norſe, or corrupt Daniſh, eſpecially ſuch as live in the more northern iſles; yea, ſo ordinary is it in ſome places, that it is the firſt language their children ſpeak. Several here alſo ſpeak good Dutch, even ſervants, though they have never been out of the country, becauſe of the many Dutch ſhips which do frequent their ports. And there are ſome who have ſomething of all theſe languages, Engliſh, Dutch and Norſe."
- Brouwer, Judith (2014). Levenstekens: Gekaapte brieven uit het Rampjaar 1672 [Signs of Life: Hijacked letters from the Disaster Year 1672]. Uitgeverij Verloren. p. 49. ISBN 9789087044053.
- Bruce, R. Stuart (1914). Johnston, Alfred W.; Johnston, Amy (eds.). "Part III – Replies – Naval Engagement, Rønis Vo, Shetland" (PDF). Old-Lore Miscellany of Orkney Shetland Caithness and Sutherland. VII (Old-Lore Series Vol. VIII). London: Viking Society for Northern Research: 101–103 – via Viking Society Web Publications.
- Burgess, John (1674). An account of the p[r]u[vi]sions Rec[eive]d into his Ma[jesties] stores at Woolw[i]ch brought from on board the Armes of Rotterdam VIZ (Letter). Woolwich, England. pp. 1–3.
- Daniell, Francis Henry Blackburne, ed. (1904) [1674]. Charles II: June 1674. London: His Majesty's Stationery Office. pp. 291–292 – via British History Online. "Privy Seal to the Principal Commissioners of Prizes and the Lord High Treasurer for payment of 500l. to Capt. John Wetwang, commander of the Newcastle, out of the proceeds of sale of the goods out of the Arms of Amsterdam, bound for the East Indies and seized by him near the Shetland Isles and brought safe to the Thames, and, if the said goods do not produce the said sum, the Lord High Treasurer is to find out some other proper way for payment thereof, as a free gift. [S.P. Dom., Car. II. 359, p. 30.]"
- Davenport, Frances Gardiner (1929). Jameson, J. Franklin (ed.). European treaties bearing on the history of the United States and its dependencies. Vol. 2. Robarts – University of Toronto. Washington, D.C.: Carnegie Institution of Washington. pp. 229–240. OCLC 717779114.
- Edwardson, John W. F. "Hollanders' Grave, and the Battle of Ronas Voe". roymullay.com. Eshaness, Shetland: Tangwick Haa Museum. Archived from the original on 27 March 2019.
- Graham, John J. (1979). "Introduction to The Shetland Dictionary". Shetland ForWirds.
- Jack, William (1999) [1794]. Sinclair, Sir John (ed.). "Northmaven". The Statistical Account of Scotland Drawn up from the Communications of the Ministers of the Different Parishes. 12 (27). University of Edinburgh, University of Glasgow: Edinburgh: William Creech: 359. OCLC 1045293275 – via The Statistical Accounts of Scotland online service.
- Murdoch, Steve; Little, Andrew; Forte, Angelo (2005). "Scottish Privateering, Swedish Neutrality and Prize Law in the Third Anglo-Dutch War, 1672–1674". Forum Navale. 59: 37 – via academia.edu.
- Pepys, Samuel (1904) [1674]. Tanner, J. R. (ed.). "Admiralty Letters". Publications of the Navy Records Society. A Descriptive Catalogue of The Naval Manuscripts in the Pepysian Library at Magdalene College, Cambridge. 27 (2). The Navy Record Society: 247–285. OCLC 848547357. OL 24226048M – via archive.org.
- Pepys, Samuel (1923) [1674]. Tanner, J. R. (ed.). "Admiralty Journal". Publications of the Navy Records Society. A Descriptive Catalogue of The Naval Manuscripts in the Pepysian Library at Magdalene College, Cambridge. 57 (4). The Navy Record Society: 30. OCLC 827219323. OL 14003544M – via archive.org.
- A Sale of His Majesties Prize Goods by the Arms of Rotterdam, to be made at the East-India-House, on Thursday the 14th. of May 1674, at Eight of the Clock in the Morning; the particulars are, VIZ. sn. 1674. pp. 1–2.
- "Abraham Hyatt". threedecks.org. 2019.
- "Arthur Herbert (1648–1716)". threedecks.org. 2019.
- Barshot from the battle between V.O.C. Het Wapen van Rotterdam and the British squadron of HMS Newcastle, Crown, Buck, Cambridge. In Ronas Voe, Dec. 1674. ca. 1673. [Cast iron]. At: Shetland Museum and Archives. SEA 7691.
- "British 'Dove' (1672)". threedecks.org. 2019.
- "British Fourth Rate ship of the line 'Newcastle' (1653)". threedecks.org. 2019.
- "British Fourth Rate ship 'Taunton' (1654)". threedecks.org. 2019.
- "British Third Rate ship of the line 'Arms of Rotterdam' (1674)". threedecks.org. 2019.
- "British Third Rate ship of the line 'Cambridge' (1666)". threedecks.org. 2019.
- "De VOCsite : gegevens VOC-schip Wapen Van Rotterdam (1666)" [The VOCsite: details of the VOC ship Wapen van Rotterdam (1666)]. www.vocsite.nl. 2019. Archived from the original on 5 November 2020.
- "Dutch Merchantman east indiaman 'Wapen van Rotterdam' (1666)". threedecks.org. 2019.
- "Facts about Shetland". www.bbc.co.uk. 13 October 2008.
- "Harwich, March 27" (PDF). The London Gazette. No. 872. The Savoy: The Newcomb. 27 March 1674. p. 2.
- "Hollanders Grave". www.heard.shetland.co.uk. Archived from the original on 28 March 2019.
- "Londenden 3 April" [London 3 April]. Engelandt. Amsterdamsche Courant (in Dutch). No. 15. Amsterdam: Mattheus Cousart. 3 April 1674. p. 1 – via Delpher.
- "Richard Carter (d.1692)". threedecks.org. 2019.
- "Shetland Cabbage/Kale: the oldest Scottish local vegetable variety?". SASA (Science & Advice for Scottish Agriculture).
- "Sir John Wetwang (d.1684)". threedecks.org. 2019.
- "Sunderland, Febr. 22" (PDF). The London Gazette. No. 864. The Savoy: The Newcomb. 22 February 1674. p. 2.
- "Treeless? That's Changing..." Shetland.org. 30 June 2014.
- "Voe n". Dictionary of the Scots Language. Scottish Language Dictionaries Ltd. 2004.
