= Treaty of Westminster (1674) =

Treaty ending the Third Anglo-Dutch War

- Type: Peace treaty
- Signed: 19 February 1674
- Location: Westminster
- Sealed: 5 March 1674
- Effective: 5 March 1674
- Signatories: King Charles II of England; States General of the Netherlands
- Parties: Kingdom of England; United Provinces
- Language: English

The Treaty of Westminster of 1674 was the peace treaty that ended the Third Anglo-Dutch War. Signed by the Dutch Republic and the Kingdom of England, the treaty provided for the return of the colony of New Netherland (now New York) to England and renewed the Treaty of Breda of 1667. The treaty also provided for a mixed commission for the regulation of commerce, particularly in the East Indies.

It was signed on 9 February 1674 Old Style (19 February 1674 New Style) by Charles II of England and ratified by the States General of the Netherlands on 5 March 1674. England was forced to sign the treaty since Parliament would not allow more money to be spent on the war and had become aware of the secret Treaty of Dover in which Charles had promised Louis XIV of France to convert to Catholicism at an opportune moment. The English were dismayed by the unexpected fact that Dutch raiders had managed to capture more English ships than vice versa and that New Amsterdam had been retaken by the Dutch in 1673.

== Background ==
In 1672, England and France had jointly attacked the Dutch Republic. France had occupied a large part of the Republic, but the Anglo-French fleet had been heavily damaged by Lieutenant-Admiral Michiel de Ruyter. In 1673, sustained efforts by the Royal Navy to defeat the Dutch fleet and to land an army on the Dutch coast had failed. Repairs of the English warships proved to be very costly. English mercantile shipping suffered from frequent attacks by Dutch privateers. Meanwhile, France, the English ally in the war, was forced to a gradual withdrawal of its troops from most of the territory of the United Provinces. France threatened to conquer the Spanish Netherlands, which would harm English strategic interests. The war, more or less a private project of Charles and never popular among the English people, now seemed to most to have become a hopeless undertaking.

The English had also been convinced by Dutch propaganda that the war was part of a plot to make their country Roman Catholic again. The commander of the Royal Navy, Prince Rupert of the Rhine, a devout Protestant, had begun to lead a vociferous movement aimed at breaking the French alliance. In late October, Charles asked Parliament for a sufficient war budget for 1674. Its members were extremely critical and denied that it was still necessary to eliminate the Dutch as commercial rivals because English trade had satisfyingly grown between 1667 and 1672. The proposed marriage of the King's brother, the Duke of York, with the Catholic Mary of Modena was lamented. Parliament demanded securities for the defence of the Anglican Church against papism, the disbanding of the standing army (commanded by York) and the removal of pro-French ministers.

When the situation threatened to escalate, Charles, on the advice of the French envoy but against the opinion of the Privy Council, prorogued Parliament. Charles made a last effort to continue the war, even without a war budget. He was promised increased subsidies by King Louis XIV of France. He made plans to capture the regular treasure fleet sailing from the Dutch East Indies. He removed his enemies from office, among them Chancellor Anthony Ashley Cooper, 1st Earl of Shaftesbury, the main opponent of York's marriage. At the same time, Charles tried to lessen fears by reaffirming anti-Catholic measures such as the suspension of the Royal Declaration of Indulgence and by publicising many of his secret treaties with France.

To his dismay, Parliament became more adversarial, now strongly incited by Shaftesbury. Some called for William III of Orange, the stadtholder of Holland and grandson of Charles I of England, to become king if Charles died by excluding the Duke of York. That came as no surprise to William, who had secret dealings with Shaftesbury and many other English politicians. William had agents working for him in England, such as his secretary, Van Rhede. Spain assisted him by threatening to declare war and meanwhile bribing parliamentarians. The States-General had supported the pro-Dutch peace party of Lord Arlington in a more formal manner by making a peace proposal in October and by regularly distributing manifests and declarations in England that explained the official Dutch position and policy. In 1672, England and France had agreed never to conclude a separate peace, but the States now revealed to Charles that they had recently received a peace offer from Louis.

When in late December, General François-Henri de Montmorency, duc de Luxembourg withdrew the bulk of the French occupation army from Maastricht to Namur, Charles lost faith completely and decided to disentangle himself from the entire affair.

== Procedure ==
Charles felt that continuing the alliance with France had become a grave threat to his personal position and expected that Parliament would no longer fund the war. He informed the French ambassador, Colbert de Croissy, that to his regret, he had to terminate the English war effort. He told the Dutch via the Spanish consul in London, the Marquess del Fresno, that his main war aim, to install his noble nephew as stadtholder, having been attained, he no longer objected to concluding a lasting peace between the two Protestant brother nations if only some minor "indemnities" could be paid. At first, the States of Holland were disinclined to grant Charles's demands. As England had accomplished nothing in the war, it was in their opinion not entitled to any reward. Many members admitted their personal satisfaction in the thought that the British might be kept suffering a bit longer. However, stadtholder William III of Orange convinced them that there was some chance of bringing Charles into the war against France eventually, which this had to take precedence over petty considerations of retribution that were unworthy of their high office. Furthermore, Spain had not yet declared war on France and was willing to do so only if England made peace because it feared English attacks on its American colonies.

On 4 January 1674, the States General of the Netherlands drafted a final peace proposal. On 7 January, a Dutch trumpeter arrived in Harwich carrying with him two letters for the Spanish consul. Though the herald was promptly arrested by the town mayor, the letters were sent to Lord Arlington, who hurriedly brought them in person to del Fresno. Arlington was, in turn, on 15 January, impeached by Sir Gilbert Gerard for high treason, as the very act showed him to have had secret dealings with the enemy. On 24 January, the consul handed the letters, containing the peace proposal, to Charles, who pretended to be greatly surprised. That posing was marred somewhat by the fact that he had especially recalled Parliament, prorogued by him in November, for that occasion the very same day. While addressing both Houses, Charles first emphatically denied the existence of any secret provisions of the Treaty of Dover and then produced the peace proposal, to the great satisfaction of the members, who, in turn, had to pretend surprise although Parliament had been informed by the Dutch beforehand of its full content. After some days of debate, the treaty was approved by Parliament.

This news was met with open joy by the populace. Charles sent his own trumpeter to Holland, who was received by the States General on 1 February. In his message, Charles announced the absolute agreement of himself and Parliament on the matter to which institution Charles gladly deferred. On 5 February, a Dutch trumpeter arrived in London, carrying the response of the States General. The very day, Parliament advised the King to conclude a "speedy peace". A Royal Commission was appointed to make a final draft. The Treaty of Westminster was signed in 1674 by the King on 9 February Old Style (19 February New Style). It was ratified by the Lord Keeper on 10 February by placement of the Great Seal. On 17 February at 10:00 a.m., it was publicly proclaimed at Whitehall. It was approved by the States of Holland and West Friesland on 4 March, (New Style) and ratified by the States General on 5 March. It was proclaimed in The Hague on 6 March. Due to the different calendars in use in the two countries and the complex procedure, when a single date is given the literature is not in agreement.

== Terms ==
Most of the initial peace conditions demanded by the English in the Accord of Heeswijk of 1672 were not met, but the Dutch paid two million guilders, from an original demand of ten million, to be paid over a period of three years, basically to compensate for the loss of French subsidies, and again affirmed the English right of salute, their Dominium Marium, now extended from "Lands End", at the Bay of Biscay, northward to "Staten Land", on the Norwegian coast. Also, it was made explicit that the Dutch had to salute any Royal ship carrying the English flag, no matter how small it was or how numerous the Dutch fleet was in encountering it, a point that had proven to be very contentious: the so-called Merlin Incident had been a pretext for the war. It was qualified by the condition that Dutch fishery would in no way be impeded by that right.

The treaty conditions of 1668 regulating trade and shipping were reconfirmed. Within three months an Anglo-Dutch commission would meet to solve trade conflicts concerning the East Indies. As for territorial disputes, the treaty was a typical status quo ante arrangement:

That whatsoever countries, islands, towns, ports, castles, or forts have or shall be taken on both sides, since the time the late unhappy war broke out, either in Europe or elsewhere, shall be restored to the former lord or proprietor, in the same condition they shall be in when the peace itself shall be proclaimed.

The condition implied that New Netherland, which had been retaken by Cornelis Evertsen the Youngest in 1673, would again be an English possession and that Suriname, which had been captured by the Dutch in 1667, would remain their colony, legalising the status quo of 1667. These issues had been left undecided by the Peace of Breda of that year, an uti possidetis agreement. Also, the islands of Tobago, Saba, St Eustatius and Tortola, which had been taken by the English in 1672, were to be returned.

Despite the peace, the brigade of British troops under Charles's bastard son, James Scott, 1st Duke of Monmouth, supporting the French, would not be withdrawn from the French Army and would be allowed to recruit in Britain until the end of the Franco-Dutch War. Charles continued to receive secret subsidies from Louis as long as the brigade fought on the French side.

== Implementation ==
As the peace could not be communicated quickly to all parts of the world, different dates had been determined upon which legal hostilities would end. From the Soundings of England, i.e. its southwestern continental shelf edge, to the coast of Norway, fighting should end by 8 March; south to Tangier by 7 April; from there to the Equator, by 5 May; and in the rest of the world, after 24 October 1674.

Due to the slow proliferation of information at the time, conflicts could still occur after the declaration of peace. The Battle of Ronas Voe took place on 14 March 1674, when the VOC East Indiaman Wapen van Rotterdam was captured in Ronas Voe, Shetland, by HMS Newcastle. It, along with HMS Cambridge and HMS Crown, were sent instructions to capture the vessel, which had become stranded in Shetland because of poor weather that had caused the ship to lose its masts and rudder. Wapen van Rotterdam was taken back to England as a prize of war. A contemporary Dutch newspaper reported that four hundred crew were originally on board Wapen van Rotterdam, but only a hundred prisoners were later being transported by Crown, which suggested that up to three hundred crew may have been killed although additional prisoners might have been transported on the other English ships.

Eventually, William would force Charles to set off the "indemnities" against the debts that he owed to the House of Orange, which had militarily supported his father, Charles I of England, during the English Civil War and so Charles II actually received very little.

== See also ==
- History of New York City
- List of treaties
- New Netherland
- Anglo-Dutch Treaties of 1814, 1824 and 1870

== Sources ==
- Blok, P.J. (1925). Geschiedenis van het Nederlandsche volk. Deel 3. Sijthoff.
- Prud'homme van Reine, Ronald (2015). Rechterhand van Nederland: Biografie van Michiel Adriaenszoon de Ruyter. Atlas Contact. ISBN 978-9045023298.
- Rodger, N. A. M. (2004). The Command of the Ocean: A Naval History of Britain, 1649–1815. Penguin. ISBN 9780713994117.
- Rowen, Herbert H (1954). "John De Witt and the Triple Alliance". The Journal of Modern History. 26 (1): 1–14. doi:10.1086/237659. JSTOR 1874869. S2CID 145695238.
- Shomette, Donald G.; Haslach, Robert D. (2002). Raid on America: The Dutch Naval Campaign of 1672–1674. University of South Carolina Press. ISBN 0788422456.
- Troost, W. (2001). Stadhouder-koning Willem III: Een politieke biografie. Hilversum: Uitgeverij Verloren. ISBN 90-6550-639-X.
- Troost, Wouter (2005). William III the Stadholder-king: A Political Biography. Routledge. ISBN 978-0754650713.
- Zwitzer, H. L. (1990). "British and Netherlands Armies in Relation to the Anglo-Dutch Alliance". Navies and Armies. Donald. ISBN 9780859762922.
- Bruce, R. Stuart (1914). Johnston, Alfred W.; Johnston, Amy (eds.). "Part III – Replies – Naval Engagement, Rønis Vo, Shetland" (PDF). Old-Lore Miscellany of Orkney Shetland Caithness and Sutherland. VII (Old-Lore Series Vol. VIII). London: Viking Society for Northern Research: 101–103 – via Viking Society Web Publications.
- Pepys, Samuel (1904) [1674]. Tanner, J. R. (ed.). "Admiralty Letters". Publications of the Navy Records Society. A Descriptive Catalogue of The Naval Manuscripts in the Pepysian Library at Magdalene College, Cambridge. 27 (2). The Navy Record Society: 247–285. OCLC 848547357. OL 24226048M – via archive.org.
- Pepys, Samuel (1923) [1674]. Tanner, J. R. (ed.). "Admiralty Journal". Publications of the Navy Records Society. A Descriptive Catalogue of The Naval Manuscripts in the Pepysian Library at Magdalene College, Cambridge. 57 (4). The Navy Record Society: 30. OCLC 827219323. OL 14003544M – via archive.org.
- "Harwich, March 27" (PDF). The London Gazette. No. 872. The Savoy: The Newcomb. 27 March 1674. p. 2.
- "Londen den 3 April" [London 3 April]. Engelandt. Amsterdamsche Courant (in Dutch). No. 15. Amsterdam: Mattheus Cousart. 3 April 1674. p. 1 – via Delpher.
