= HMS Cambridge (1666) =

Ship of the line of the Royal Navy

History

England
- Name: HMS Cambridge
- Builder: Jonas Shish, Deptford Dockyard
- Launched: 1666
- Fate: Wrecked, 1694

General characteristics
- Class & type: 70-gun third-rate ship of the line
- Tons burthen: 881
- Length: 121 ft (37 m) (keel)
- Beam: 37 ft 10 in (11.53 m)
- Depth of hold: 16 ft 4 in (4.98 m)
- Propulsion: Sails
- Sail plan: Full-rigged ship
- Armament: 70 guns of various weights of shot

HMS Cambridge was a 70-gun third-rate ship of the line of the Royal Navy, built by shipwright Jonas Shish, and launched in 1666 at Deptford Dockyard.

On 12 March 1672, Cambridge took part in the attack on the Dutch Smyrna convoy, which led to the outbreak of the Third Anglo-Dutch War. She went on to fight in a number of battles in the war, including Solebay (1672), the first day of Schooneveld (1673), and Texel (1673).

On 14 March 1674, Cambridge, captained by Arthur Herbert (later 1st Earl of Torrington) along with HMS Newcastle and HMS Crown captured the Dutch East Indiaman Wapen van Rotterdam in the Battle of Ronas Voe, as part of the Third Anglo-Dutch War.

Cambridge was still in service during the Nine Years' War, and took part in the battles of Bantry Bay (1689), Beachy Head (1690), and Barfleur (1692).

Cambridge was wrecked in 1694, on the Spanish coast near Gibraltar. 100 men drowned.
