= English ship Taunton =

Ship of the line of the Royal Navy

History

Commonwealth of England
- Name: Taunton
- Builder: William Castle, Rotherhithe
- Launched: 1654

Kingdom of England
- Renamed: HMS Crown, 1660
- Fate: Wrecked, 1719

General characteristics as built
- Class & type: Fourth-rate frigate
- Tons burthen: 5361/94 bm
- Length: 100 ft 6 in (30.6 m) (keel)
- Beam: 31 ft 8 in (9.7 m)
- Depth of hold: 13 ft (4.0 m)
- Sail plan: Full-rigged ship
- Armament: 40 guns (1660); 48 guns (1677)

General characteristics after 1689 rebuild
- Class & type: 46-54-gun fourth-rate ship of the line
- Tons burthen: 57611/94 bm
- Length: 120 ft 5.5 in (36.7 m) (on gundeck), 100 ft (30.5 m) (keel)
- Beam: 32 ft 11 in (10.0 m)
- Depth of hold: 13 ft (4.0 m)
- Sail plan: Full-rigged ship
- Armament: 46-54 guns of various weights of shot

General characteristics after 1704 rebuild
- Class & type: 46-54-gun fourth-rate ship of the line
- Tons burthen: 65239/94 bm
- Length: 126 ft 8 in (38.6 m) (on gundeck), 103 ft 4 in (31.5 m) (keel)
- Beam: 34 ft 5.5 in (10.5 m)
- Depth of hold: 13 ft 6 in (4.1 m)
- Sail plan: Full-rigged ship
- Armament: 46-54 guns of various weights of shot

The Taunton was a 40-gun fourth-rate frigate of the navy of the Commonwealth of England, originally built by contract with William Castle at Rotherhithe under the Later 1622 Programme, and launched in 1654. The frigate was named in honour of the victorious Parliamentary forces at the three Sieges of Taunton in Somerset in 1644-45 during the First English Civil War.

After the Restoration of the monarchy in 1660, the Taunton was added to the Royal Navy and her name was changed to HMS Crown. By 1677 her armament had been increased to 48 guns. On 14 March 1674, Crown, captained by Richard Carter, along with HMS Newcastle and HMS Cambridge captured the Dutch East Indiaman Wapen van Rotterdam in the Battle of Ronas Voe, as part of the Third Anglo-Dutch War.

In 1689-90 the Crown underwent a rebuilding at Woolwich Dockyard by Master Shipwright Joseph Lawrence, and in 1692 under Captain Thomas Warren she took part in the Battle of Barfleur. In 1703-04 she underwent a second rebuilding at Deptford Dockyard by Master Shipwright Fisher Harding, from which she was relaunched on 24 June 1704 as a fourth-rate ship of the line of between 46 and 54 guns.

Crown was wrecked on 21 January 1719 off Lisbon.
