= Hawsehole =

Nautical term

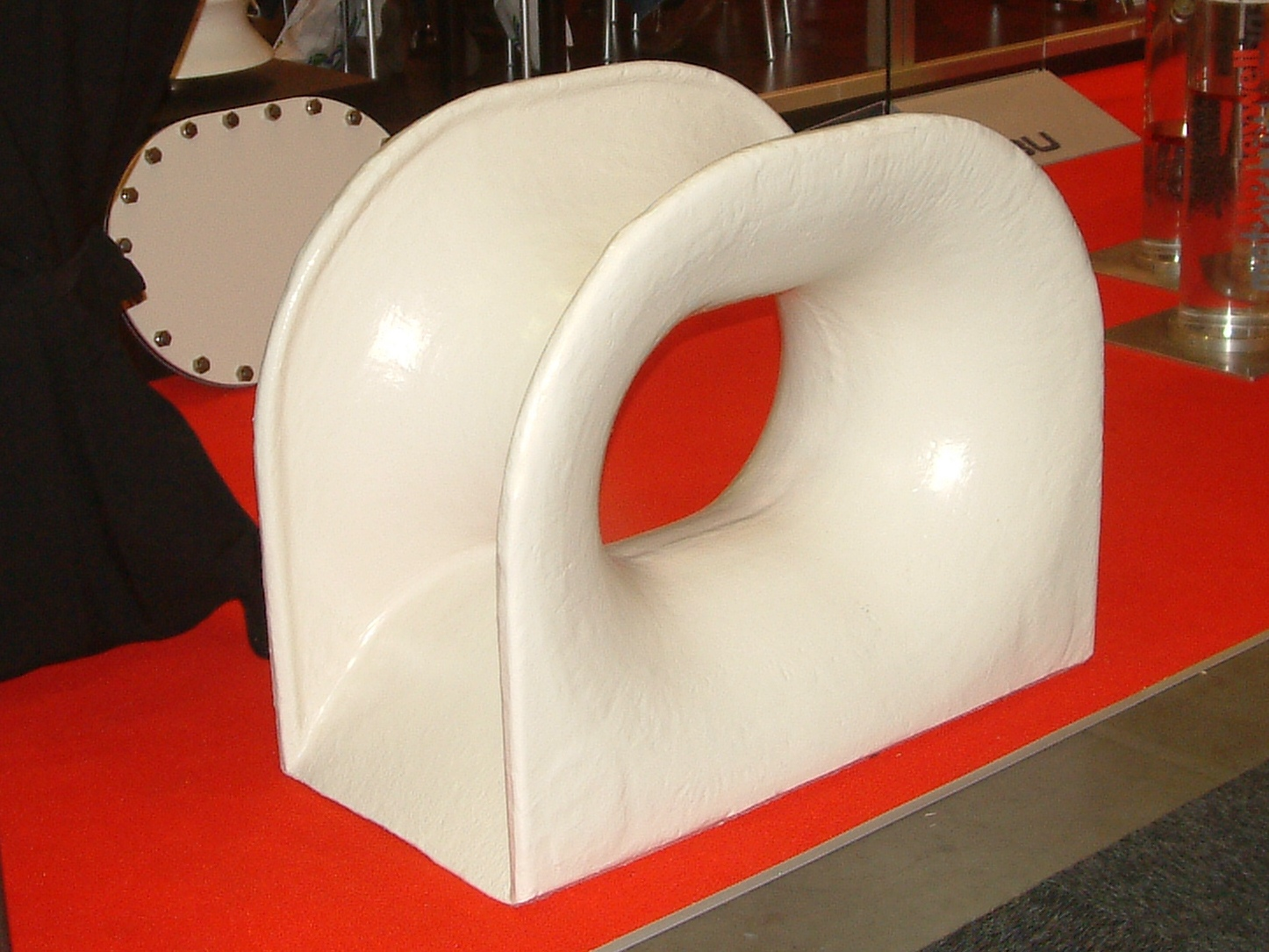

Hawsehole is a nautical term for a small hole in the hull of a ship through which hawsers may be passed. It is also known as a cat hole. In the (British) Royal Navy, a man who had risen from the lowest grade to officer was said to have "come in at the hawsehole".

== See also ==
- Hawsepiper
