= Arthur Herbert, 1st Earl of Torrington =

English naval officer and politician (1648–1716)

Admiral The Right Honourable The Earl of Torrington
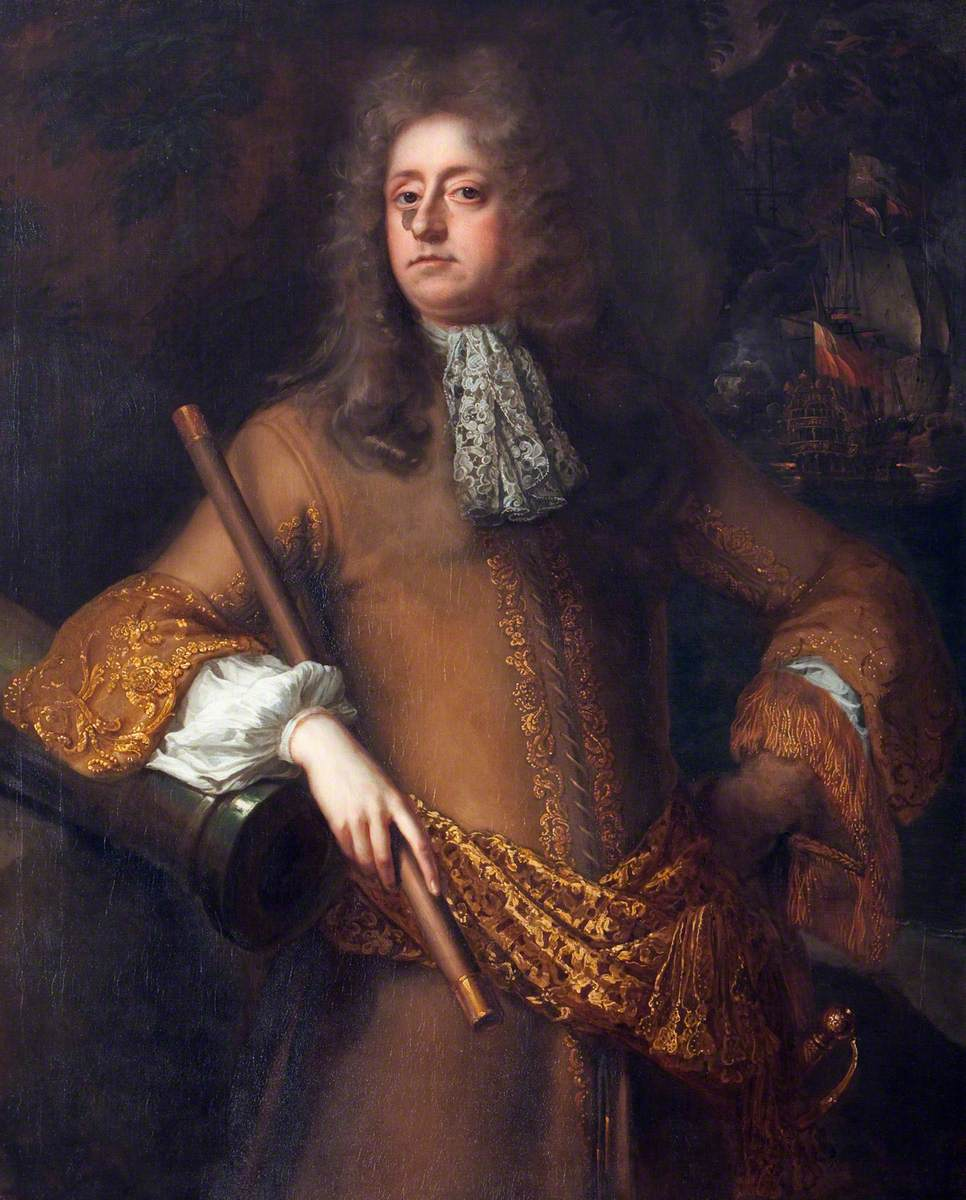
- Portrait by John Closterman, c. 1700
- Born: c. 1648
- Died: 13 April 1716 (aged 67–68)
- Burial place: Westminster Abbey
- Military career
- Allegiance: England; Dutch Republic
- Branch: Royal Navy; Dutch States Navy
- Service years: 1663–1690
- Rank: Admiral (England); Lieutenant-admiral general (Dutch Republic)
- Commands: HMS Pembroke; HMS Constant Warwick; HMS Dragon; HMS Dreadnought; HMS Cambridge; HMS Rupert
- Conflicts: Second Anglo-Dutch War; St. James's Day Battle; Battle of Bugia Bay; Third Anglo-Dutch War; Battle of Solebay; Battle of Schooneveld; Nine Years' War; 1688 Invasion of England; Battle of Bantry Bay; Battle of Beachy Head (1690)

Admiral Arthur Herbert, 1st Earl of Torrington (c. 1648 – 13 April 1716) was an English naval officer and politician. Dismissed by James II of England in 1688 for refusing to vote to repeal the Test Act, which prevented Catholics from holding public office in England, he brought the Invitation to William to William of Orange at The Hague, disguised as a simple sailor. As a reward William made him the nominal commander of the Dutch fleet which landed at Torbay, Devon on 5 November 1688, which initiated the Glorious Revolution.

== Early life ==
Born the son of Sir Edward Herbert and Margaret Smith, daughter of Thomas Smith, Herbert joined the Royal Navy in 1663. He was appointed a lieutenant in the third-rate HMS Defiance and saw action at the St. James's Day Battle in July 1666 during the Second Anglo-Dutch War.

Promoted to post-captain in 1666, he was given command of the fifth-rate HMS Pembroke in April 1667, of the fourth-rate HMS Constant Warwick in September 1668 and of the fourth-rate HMS Dragon in May 1672.

He went on to captain the third-rate HMS Dreadnought in spring 1672 and commanded her at the Battle of Solebay in May 1672 during the Franco-Dutch War. After that he took command of the third-rate HMS Cambridge in October 1673 and was severely injured while commanding her at the Battle of Schooneveld in June 1673.

He commissioned the third-rate HMS Rupert in February 1678, serving under John Narborough with the British fleet in the Mediterranean. In April 1679, Narborough returned to England, leaving Herbert in command of a squadron to continue the task of defending British interests in the Mediterranean in general and the colony of Tangier in particular. In July 1680, the Admiralty promoted Herbert to Admiral. Herbert was more successful than his predecessor, with a smaller force. In 1682, he negotiated a peace with Algiers that endured until 1816. His practice of convoying British merchant vessels showed much better protection of trade interests. Since Tangier was not well sited for action against the Barbary pirate ports of Algiers, Salé, Tripoli, and Tunis, Herbert made use of Gibraltar as a base for the fleet (arranging access with the Spanish in a local informal arrangement). Herbert's command in the Mediterranean continued until June 1683.

== Flag officer ==
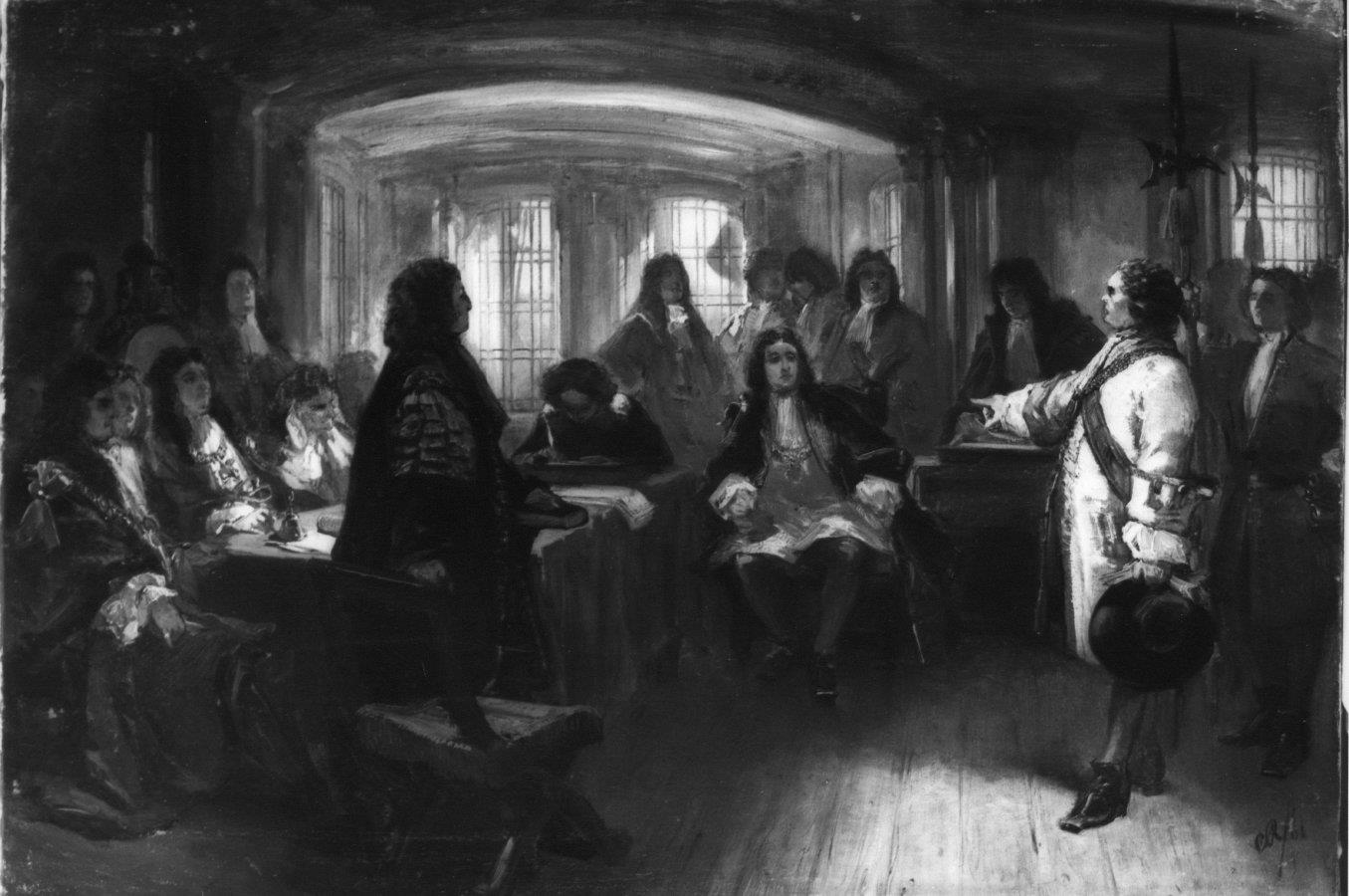
Painting of Gilles Schey blaming Torrington for the defeat at Beachy Head in the post-battle court-martial

Herbert was appointed Rear-Admiral of England in 1683 and Master of the Robes in 1685. These employments brought him in £4,000 a year. However, when James II of England required him to promise that he would vote for the repeal of the Test Act, which prevented Roman Catholics from holding public office, his answer was "that his honour and conscience would not permit him to give any such pledge". The King replied: "Nobody doubts your honour, but a man who lives as you do ought not to talk about his conscience". To this reproach (which came from a bad grace from the lover of Catherine Sedley) Herbert replied: "I have my faults, sir; but I could name people who talk much more about conscience than I am in the habit of doing, and yet lead lives as loose as mine." The King immediately dismissed him from all his offices.

Disguised as a common sailor, Herbert went to the Dutch Republic in June 1688, carrying the Invitation to William, a letter written by seven prominent Englishmen requesting William, Prince of Orange overthrow James II. In The Hague, Herbert met with William and delivered the letter, offering his services to the Prince. William accepted Herbert's offer and allowed him to play a role in the Prince's planned invasion of England to overthrow James II, promoting him to lieutenant-admiral general of the Dutch States Navy. In an effort to dissuade the Royal Navy from attacking his invasion fleet, William appointed Herbert as the fleet's commander, although the Prince decreed that until the moment it made contact with the English navy Herbert was to share command with Lieutenant-admiral Cornelis Evertsen the Youngest and consult with him on all significant matters. The invasion fleet landed in England on 6 October after having made no contact with the Royal Navy.

Following the Glorious Revolution, Herbert became Lord High Admiral and then, when the post of Lord High Admiral had been put into commission, he became First Lord of the Admiralty and Senior Naval Lord on the Board of Admiralty in March 1689. He was raised to the peerage by the new King William III as Earl of Torrington and Baron Herbert of Torbay in May 1689, following on his command of the English squadron at the Battle of Bantry Bay. He was credited with being the first to use the expression, "fleet in being". He proposed avoiding a set battle, except under very favourable conditions, until the arrival of reinforcements: by maintaining his fleet in being, he would force the French to remain in the area and prevent them from undertaking other operations.

Herbert commanded an Anglo-Dutch fleet at the Battle of Beachy Head on 10 July 1690, a serious defeat for the allied fleet, in the Nine Years' War. He was imprisoned in the Tower of London and was court-martialed for failing to support the Dutch van squadron against the French, but was acquitted. Nevertheless, he lost his position as First Lord of the Admiralty, and took no further part in public life. The stories that Torrington was not a popular commander, because of his reputation of being a drunk and his habit of taking several prostitutes with him to sea, have been contradicted. Thomas Babington Macaulay judged him very harshly: "A man sunk in indolence, stupefied by wine, enervated by licentiousness, ruined by prodigality, and enslaved by sycophants and harlots".

In 1696, he acquired Oatlands Park, an estate forfeited by his brother, Sir Edward Herbert, who had followed King James II into exile. He died on 13 April 1716 without children, rendering his titles extinct, and was buried in Westminster Abbey.

== Marriages ==
Torrington married twice, but had no issue by either wife:

- Firstly to Anne Hadley, from whom he later separated;
- Secondly to the twice widowed Anne (dowager Lady Crew), daughter and co-heiress of Sir William Armine, 2nd Baronet.

== Sources ==
- Chisholm, Hugh, ed. (1911). "Torrington, Arthur Herbert, Earl of" . Encyclopædia Britannica. Vol. 27 (11th ed.). Cambridge University Press.
- Hattendorf, John B. "Herbert, Arthur, earl of Torrington (1648–1716)". Oxford Dictionary of National Biography (online ed.). Oxford University Press. doi:10.1093/ref:odnb/13017. (Subscription, Wikipedia Library access or UK public library membership required.)
- Laughton, John Knox (1891). "Herbert, Arthur (1647–1716)" . In Stephen, Leslie; Lee, Sidney (eds.). Dictionary of National Biography. Vol. 26. London: Smith, Elder & Co.
- Le Fevre, Peter (2000). "Arthur Herbert Earl of Torrington". Precursors of Nelson: British Admirals of the Eighteenth Century. Stackpole Books. pp. 19–42. ISBN 978-0-8117-2901-7.
- Maltby, William S (1994). "The Origins of a global strategy: England from 1558 to 1713". In Williamson Murray; et al. (eds.). The making of strategy: rulers, states, and war. Cambridge, England: Cambridge University Press. ISBN 978-0-521-56627-8.
- Rodger, N.A.M. (1979). The Admiralty. Offices of State. Lavenham: T. Dalton Ltd. ISBN 0900963948.
- van Gent, T. (2000). 17 Zeventiende Eeuwse Admiralen en hun Zeeslagen (in Dutch). Den Haag: Koninklijke Vereniging van Marineofficieren. p. 90. ISBN 9789090136585.
- Burke's Extinct Peerages: TORRINGTON, E
- Prud'homme van Reine, Ronald (2009). Opkomst en Ondergang van Nederlands Gouden Vloot – Door de ogen van de zeeschilders Willem van de Velde de Oude en de Jonge. Amsterdam: De Arbeiderspers. ISBN 978-90-295-6696-4.

Parliament of England
Preceded by William Stokes; Thomas Papillon	Member of Parliament for Dover; 1685–1689; With: William Chapman	Succeeded by Sir Basil Dixwell; Thomas Papillon
Preceded by Bernard Granville; The Earl of Ranelagh	Member of Parliament for Plymouth; 1689; With: Sir John Maynard	Succeeded by Sir John Maynard; The Hon. John Granville
Court offices
Preceded by The Hon. Henry Sydney	Master of the Robes; 1685–1687	Succeeded by Lord Thomas Howard
Military offices
Preceded by Sir William Clifton	Colonel of Arthur Herbert's Regiment of Foot; 1686–1687	Succeeded by The Hon. Sackville Tufton
Preceded by King William III	Lord High Admiral; 1689	Succeeded by In commission
Preceded by Himself (Lord High Admiral)	First Lord of the Admiralty; 1689–1690	Succeeded by The Earl of Pembroke
New post	Senior Naval Lord; 1689–1690	Succeeded by Sir John Chicheley
New regiment	Colonel of the 1st Maritime Regiment; 1690	Succeeded by Earl of Danby
