= English ship Newcastle (1653) =

Ship of the line of the Royal Navy

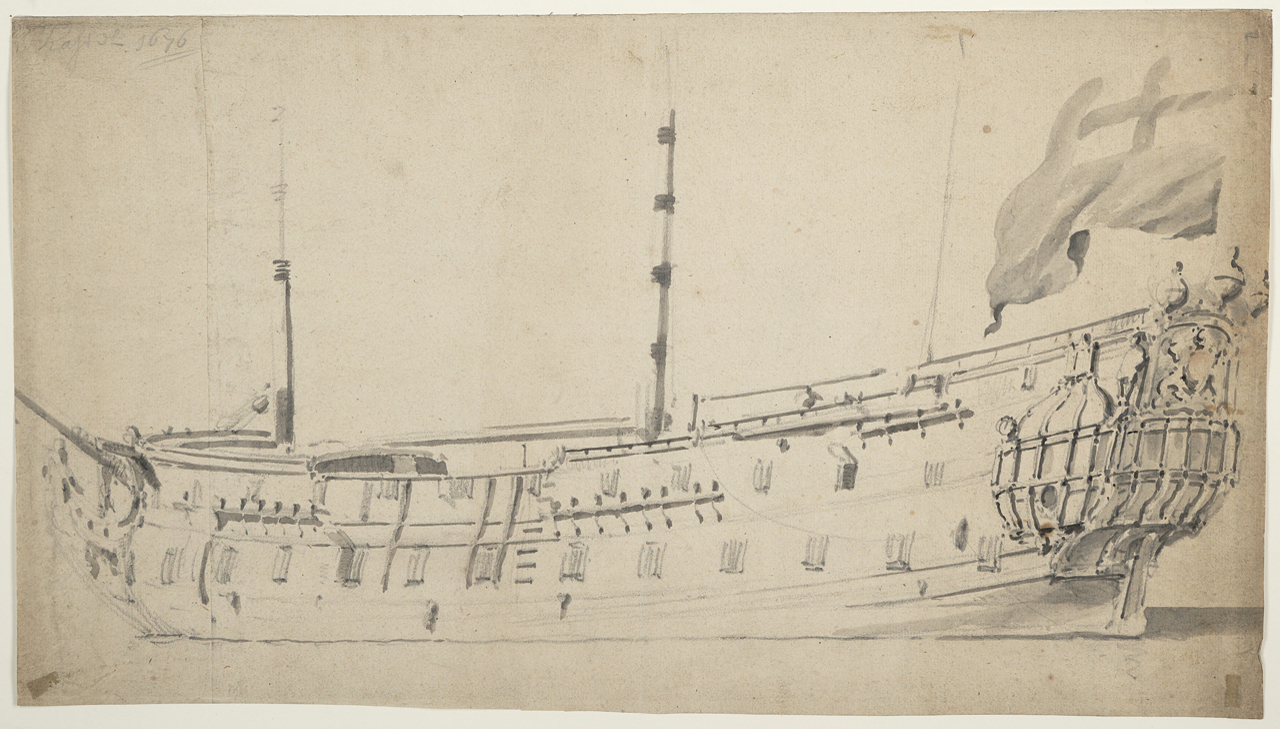
- Portrait of HMS Newcastle by Willem van de Velde, 1676

History

England
- Name: Newcastle
- Namesake: Siege of Newcastle
- Ordered: 17 February 1652
- Builder: Phineas Pett II, Ratcliffe
- Launched: May 1653
- Fate: Wrecked, 1703

General characteristics
- Class & type: Fourth-rate frigate
- Tons burthen: 631
- Length: 108 ft (32.9 m) (keel)
- Beam: 33 ft 1 in (10.1 m)
- Depth of hold: 13 ft 2 in (4.0 m)
- Sail plan: Full-rigged ship
- Armament: 44 guns (1660); 54 guns (1677)

Newcastle was a 44-gun fourth-rate frigate of the English Royal Navy, originally built for the Commonwealth of England by Phineas Pett the Younger at Ratcliffe, and launched in May 1653. By 1677 her armament had been increased to 54 guns.

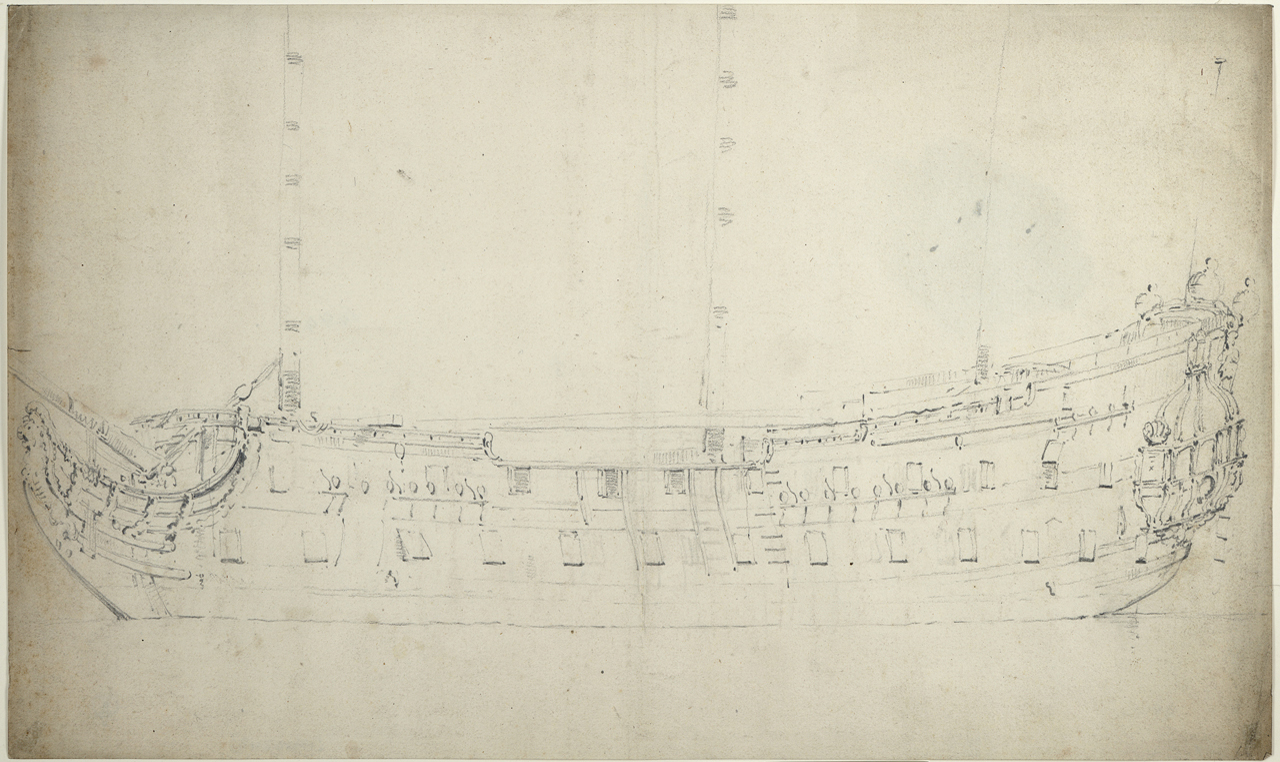
Sketch of HMS Newcastle by Willem van de Velde, circa 1678

Her first action came in 1655 when, along with fourteen other warships, she sailed into Porto Farina in Algiers to engage Barbary Pirates. This action resulted in the destruction of the entire pirate fleet, which won the Newcastle lineage its first battle honour. In 1657 she took part in Admiral Blake's daring attack on Santa Cruz de Tenerife, and in 1665, she fought at the Battle of Lowestoft.

On 14 March 1674, Newcastle, under the command of Sir John Wetwang, captured the Dutch East India ship Wapen van Rotterdam in the Battle of Ronas Voe.

Prior to the November 1688 Glorious Revolution, George Churchill assumed command and Newcastle was assigned to the Channel. Shortly before Plymouth declared for William III on 18 November, Churchill entered the port for repairs but this appears to have been an excuse; Newcastle was the first significant naval defection and the rest of the fleet soon followed.

Newcastle was wrecked at Spithead in the Great Storm of 1703 with the loss of 229 of her crew.
