= John Wetwang =

Royal Navy officer

Captain Sir John Wetwang
- Died: 1684; Madras, India
- Occupation: Royal Navy captain

Captain Sir John Wetwang (died 1684) was a Royal Navy officer.

== Biography ==
Wetwang had possibly been with Prince Rupert or the French privateers during the Commonwealth (cf. Gardiner, First Dutch War, i. 21). The first mention of him is in 1665, when he was appointed captain of the Norwich, a fifth-rate attached to the red squadron in the action off Lowestoft on 3 June. In 1666 he was captain of the Tiger, in 1668 of the Dunkirk, a third-rate. In 1672 he commanded the 70-gun ship Edgar, one of the blue squadron, in the battle of Solebay; in 1673 he was flag-captain to Prince Rupert in the Sovereign. In November he was appointed to the Newcastle, in which, in March 1674, he captured a large Dutch East Indiaman ‘of very great value.’ At the end of the war he took the Newcastle out to the Mediterranean, whence he brought home the ‘trade’ in the spring of 1676. In 1678 he commanded the Royal James as flag-captain to Sir Thomas Allin; in 1679 he was captain of the Northumberland, in 1680 of the Woolwich. On 20 Nov. 1680 he was knighted. In October 1683 he was appointed captain of the East India Company's ship Royal James, with a double commission from the king and the company to command the fleet in the East Indies for reinstating the king of Bantam and re-establishing the trade there. With him was Sir Thomas Grantham, who had a commission to command in his absence. Wetwang died at Fort St. George, Madras, within a few weeks of his arrival in 1684. His will (in Somerset House: Cann, 50)—signed 18 October 1683, proved 8 April 1685—constitutes his ‘dear and well-beloved wife Isabel’ sole executrix, and leaves everything to her during her natural life; after her death, which happened in 1691, to be equally divided among his four sons—Robert, John, Samuel, and Joseph. A brother Joseph, a captain in the navy, is mentioned by Charnock (ii. 58).
