= Foresail =

Type of sail

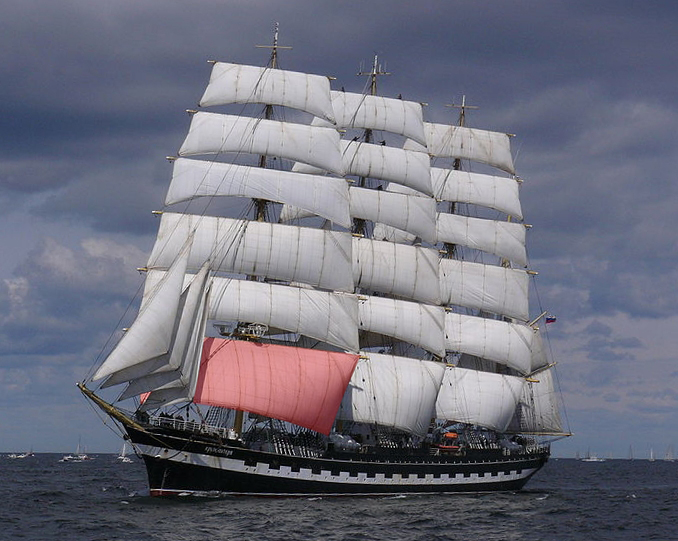
The foresail (in pink) of a full rigged ship.

A foresail is one of a few different types of sail set on the foremost mast (foremast) of a sailing vessel:

- A fore-and-aft sail set on the foremast of a schooner or similar vessel.
- The lowest square sail on the foremast of a full-rigged ship or other vessel which is square-rigged.

Sails set forward of the mainmast, such as jibs and staysails, are sometimes referred to as foresails, although "headsails" is a more common term, headsail can also specifically refer to the sail on a forestay that connects directly to the head of the mast.

== History ==
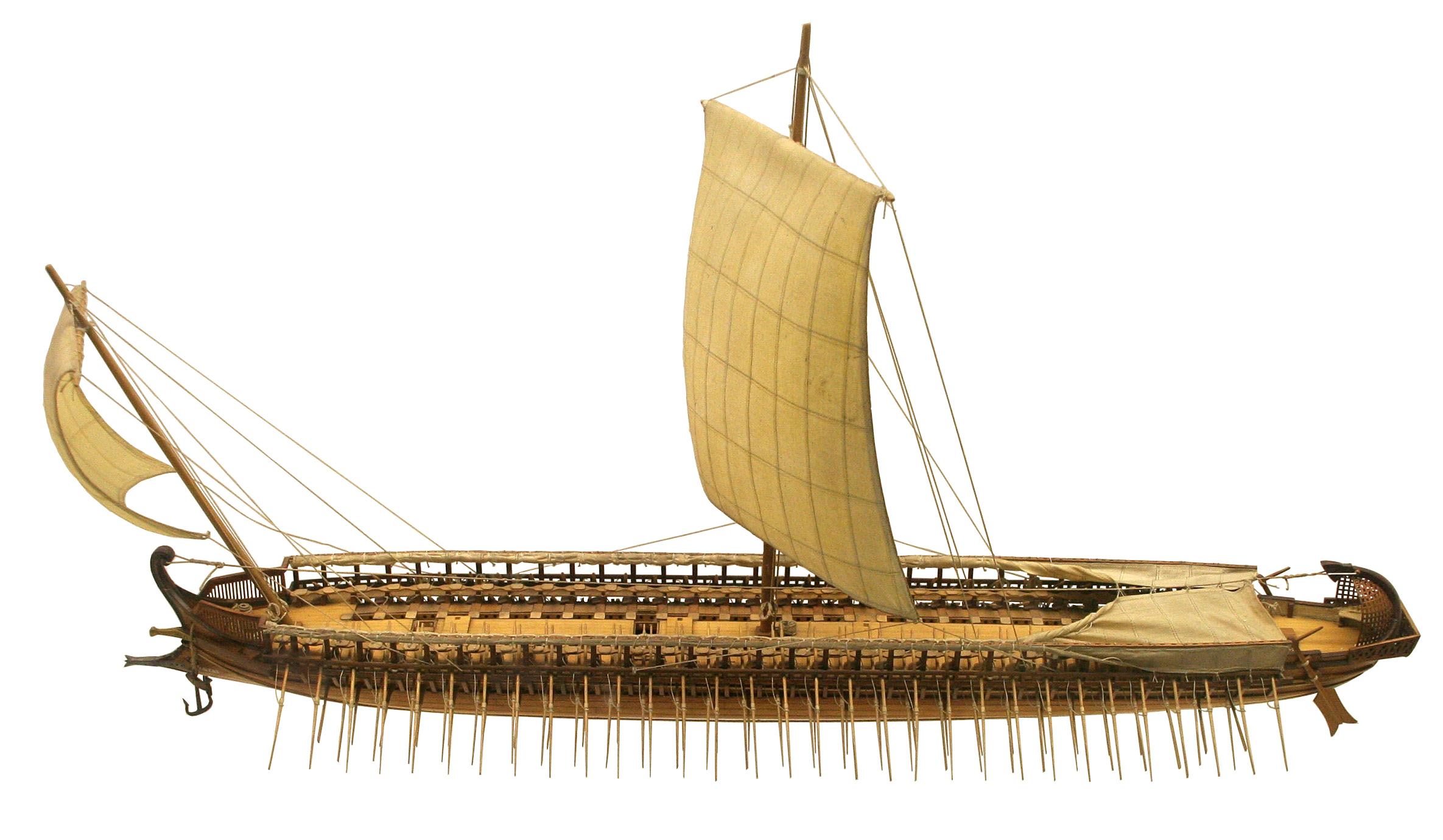
Model of ancient Greek trireme with raked foresail, called artemon

Foresails set on foremasts between midships and bow were the first type of sail to appear after the mainsail which had been the sole standard rig on sailing vessels for millennia, down to classical antiquity. The earliest foresail, or two-masted ship, has been identified on an Etruscan pyxis from Caere, Italy, dating to the mid-7th century BC: a warship with a furled mainsail is engaging an enemy vessel, deploying a foresail. A two-masted merchant vessel with a sizable foresail rigged on a slightly inclined foremast is depicted in an Etruscan tomb painting from 475 to 450 BC. An artemon (Greek for foresail) almost the same size as the galley's mainsail can be found on a Corinthian krater as early as the late 6th century BC, but apart from that Greek longships of the 8th–5th century BC are uniformly shown without it.

The foresail became fairly common on Roman war galleys, where it seems to be used rather for steering than as a driver. Its size was reduced and the now strongly raked foremast made it more appear like a bowsprit sail. While most of the evidence is iconographic, the existence of foresails can also archaeologically be deduced from slots in foremast-feet located too close to the prow for a mainsail. Artemon, along with mainsail and topsail, developed into the standard rig of seagoing vessels in imperial times, complemented by a mizzen on the largest freighters. Throughout antiquity, both foresail and mizzen remained secondary in terms of canvas size, but still large enough to require full running rigging. In late antiquity, the foremast lost most of its tilt, standing nearly upright on some ships.

By the onset of the Early Middle Ages, rigging had undergone a fundamental transformation in Mediterranean navigation: the lateen which had long evolved on smaller Greco-Roman craft replaced the square rig, the chief sail type of the ancients, which practically disappeared from the record until the 14th century (while it remained dominant in northern Europe). The dromon, the lateen-rigged and oared bireme of the Byzantine navy, almost certainly had two sails, a larger foresail and one midships. The length of its foremast has been estimated at 12 m, somewhat smaller than that of the Sicilian war galleys of the time.

Multiple-masted sailing ships were reintroduced into the Mediterranean by the Late Middle Ages. Large vessels were coming more and more into use and the need for additional sails to control these ships adequately grew with the increase in tonnage. Unlike in antiquity, the foresail was adopted on medieval two-masters after the mizzen, evidence for which dates to the mid-14th century. To balance out the sail plan the next obvious step was to add a mast fore of the main-mast, which first appears on a Catalan vessel from 1409. With the three-masted ship established, propelled by square rig and lateen, and guided by the pintle-and-gudgeon rudder, all advanced ship design technology necessary for the Age of Discovery's great transoceanic voyages was in place by the early 15th century.

== See also ==
- Sail plan
