= Hawser =

Nautical mooring line

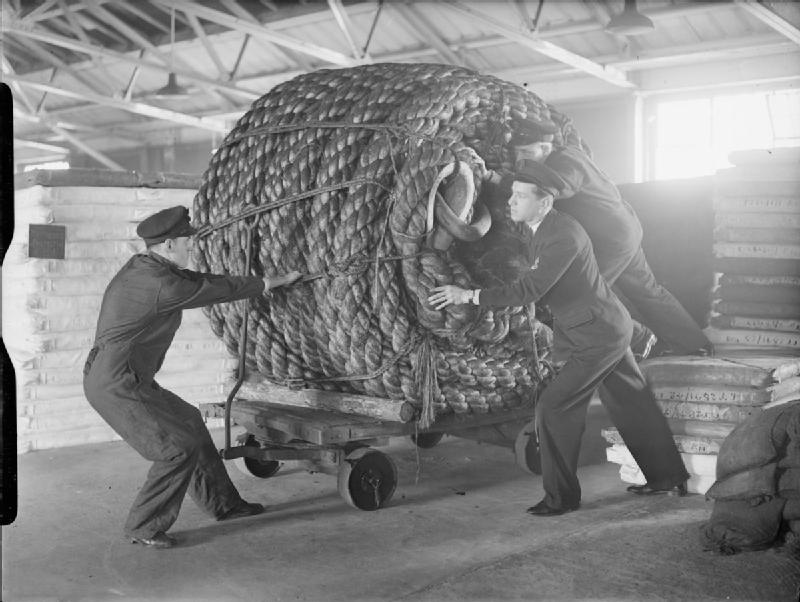
Supply ratings handling a coil of 16 inches (410 mm) towing hawser (rope) at the Royal Navy's Naval Stores Department, Nore, Harwich, which supplies all of the Royal Navy's sea-going ships with the stores and provisions that they need. Note that the coil is bigger than the men and they need a trolley to transport it.

The hawser is coiled on deck.

A hawser (/ˈhɔːzər/) is a thick rope used in mooring or towing a ship. A hawser is not waterproof, as is a cable. A hawser is an anchor rope, located on the hawse.
