= Wapen van Rotterdam =

History

Dutch East India Company
- Name: Wapen van Rotterdam
- Owner: Dutch East India Company
- Acquired: 1666
- In service: 1667
- Captured: 14 March 1674
- Fate: Captured in the Battle of Ronas Voe

England
- Name: HMS Arms of Rotterdam
- Owner: Royal Navy
- Acquired: 1674
- In service: 1674
- Out of service: 1703
- Fate: Broken up in Chatham 1703

General characteristics
- Class & type: East Indiaman (1666); unarmed hulk (1674)
- Tons burthen: 1124
- Length: 160 Amsterdam feet (45.30m)
- Beam: 30 Amsterdam feet (10.76m)
- Depth of hold: 18.5 Amsterdam feet (5.11m)
- Sail plan: Full-rigged ship
- Armament: 70 guns (1666); 0 (1675)

Wapen van Rotterdam was a Dutch East India Company East Indiaman that was built in 1666 for the Rotterdam Chamber of the VOC, and was operated from 1667, twice travelling to the Indies, until its capture by the English Royal Navy's frigate HMS Newcastle on 14 March 1674 in the Battle of Ronas Voe.

After its capture, it was renamed HMS Arms of Rotterdam (sometimes spelled Armes of Rotterdam) and was refitted as an unarmed hulk. In 1703 Arms of Rotterdam was broken up in Chatham.
