= Gilbert Talbot (courtier) =

English diplomat and courtier

Sir Gilbert Talbot FRS
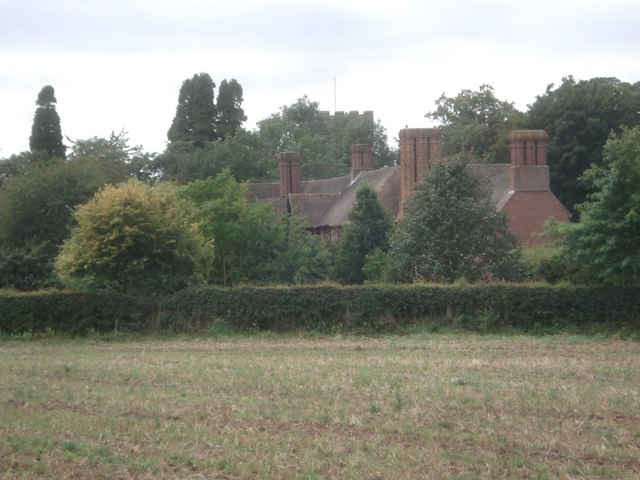
- Talbot family home, Salwarpe Court

Deputy Lieutenant, Wiltshire
- In office 1688–1689
- Monarch: James II

MP for Plymouth
- In office 1666–1679
- Monarch: Charles II
- Preceded by: Samuel Trelawny †
- Succeeded by: John Maynard

Special Envoy Denmark-Norway
- In office 1664–1666
- Monarch: Charles II

Master of the Jewel Office
- In office 1660–1690

Envoy to the Republic of Venice
- In office 1637–1645
- Monarch: Charles I

Personal details
- Born: ca 1606 Salwarpe, Worcestershire
- Died: 15 December 1695 (aged 89) Lacock Abbey, Wiltshire
- Resting place: St Michael's, Salwarpe
- Parent(s): Sharington Talbot (1577–1642); Elizabeth Leighton (1580–1631)
- Education: Christ Church, Oxford; Lincoln College, Oxford
- Occupation: Diplomat

Sir Gilbert Talbot (c. 1606–1695) was an English diplomat, who held offices in the Republic of Venice from 1634 to 1645, then Denmark-Norway from 1664 to 1666. He was Member of Parliament for Plymouth, from 1666 to 1679.

During the 1642 to 1646 First English Civil War, he unsuccessfully negotiated with the Venetians to provide Charles I financial support. He returned to England in January 1645, and was knighted; he avoided involvement in the 1648 Second English Civil War, but was arrested for conspiracy in 1650. After his release, he joined Charles II in exile.

Following the 1660 Restoration, he was appointed Master of the Jewel Office, and served as special Envoy to Denmark during the 1664 to 1667 Second Anglo-Dutch War. A long-time Stuart loyalist, he was appointed Deputy Lieutenant of Wiltshire by James II in 1688.

After the November 1688 Glorious Revolution, he refused to swear allegiance to the new regime of Mary II and William III, and lost his positions as a result. He never married, and died on 23 July 1695.

== Early life ==
Gilbert Talbot was born in 1606, younger son of Sharington Talbot (1577–1642) and his first wife Elizabeth Leighton (1580–1631). The family was related to the Talbot Earls of Shrewsbury, and originated from Salwarpe, Worcestershire; they acquired Lacock Abbey, Wiltshire through his grandmother, Olive. The Talbots were a long-lived family; Olive died in 1646, at the age of 97, both Gilbert and his elder brother Sharington (1591-1677) lived into their 80s, as did many other relatives.

He also had four half-brothers from his father's second marriage to Mary Washburn; George, Edward, who was killed in the First English Civil War, William (died 1686), and Francis.

He studied at Christ Church, Oxford, where he was awarded BA in 1626, then Lincoln College, Oxford, where he gained an MA in 1628. He was a fellow of All Souls College, Oxford, from 1629 to 1634.

== Diplomatic career ==
In 1634, he joined the English mission to the Republic of Venice, where he served as Secretary, Resident, then lastly Envoy. During the 1642–1646 First English Civil War, he tried to persuade the Venetians to provide financial assistance to Charles I, while devising schemes for confiscating Parliamentarian merchant ships in Constantinople. However, given London's importance in the Levant trade, the Venetians never seriously contemplated this.

He returned to England in January 1645, and made his way to Charles' war-time capital of Oxford, where he was knighted. At the beginning of 1645, the Royalists still controlled most of the West Country, Wales, and counties along the English border. Despite his lack of military experience, Talbot was appointed governor of Tiverton Castle, in Devon; his elder brother, Colonel Sharington Talbot, commanded the Royalist garrison at Lacock Abbey, Wiltshire.

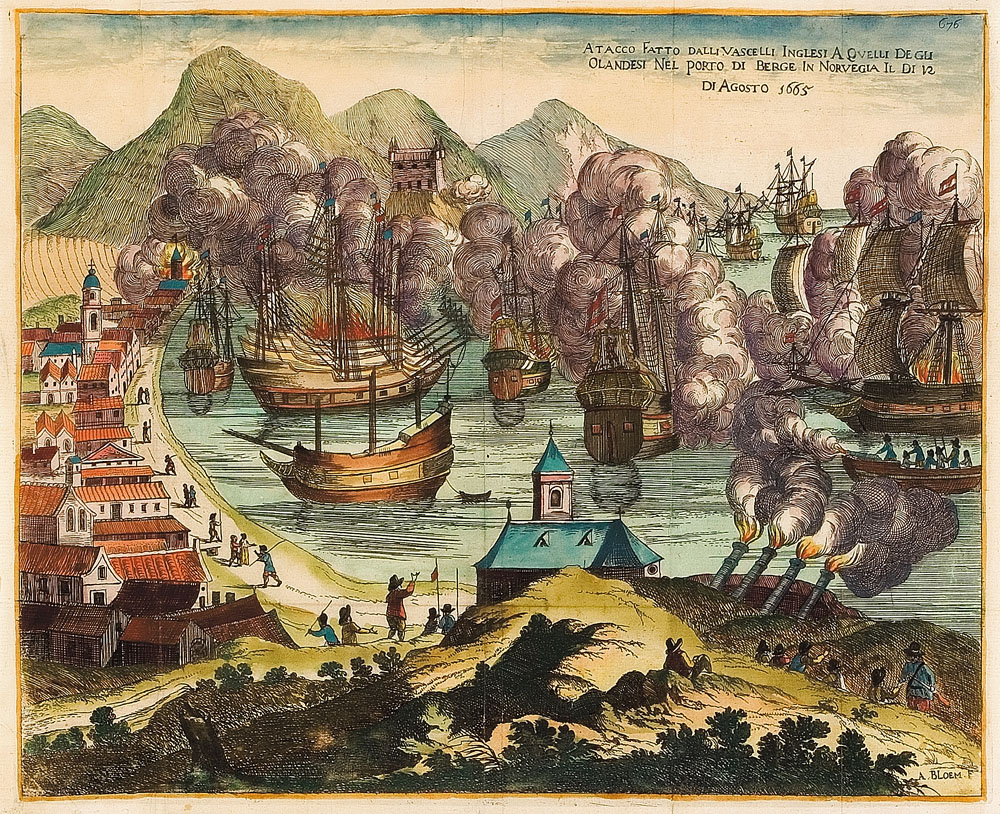
Vågen in August 1665; Talbot was blamed for the confusion that led to English defeat

A series of victories by the New Model Army under Sir Thomas Fairfax meant by mid-July the Royalists faced defeat. Tiverton fell on 19 October; taken prisoner, Talbot was exchanged, and made his way to Oxford, which surrendered in June 1646, bringing the First Civil War to an end.

Under the Articles of Surrender, signed on 20 June, he was allowed to return home, without having to 'compound', or pay a fine. He retired to Dartmouth, and took no part in the 1648 Second English Civil War; in 1650, he was arrested on suspicion of conspiring to restore Charles II, and held in Gloucester gaol.

On his release, he went abroad to join the exiled court around Charles II, and was made a Gentleman Usher of the Privy Chamber. During this period, he became part of the faction opposed to the Earl of Clarendon, centred around the Duke of Ormond; at the 1660 Restoration, Ormonde gained him an appointment as Master of the Jewel House.

During the Second Anglo-Dutch War, in September 1664, he was sent as special envoy to Denmark. He acted as intermediary in secret discussions between Charles and Frederick III in August 1665, over an attack on a Dutch merchant fleet taking shelter in the Norwegian port of Bergen. Although Frederick was a Dutch ally, he agreed to order his garrison not to fire on the English squadron, in return for a share of the profits. In the event, they opened fire, and Sir Thomas Teddeman was forced to retreat; Sir Gilbert was blamed for the confusion and recalled in April 1666.

On his return, he was elected to fill a recent vacancy as Member of Parliament for Plymouth in 1666.

== Royal Society ==
Talbot was elected as a founding member of the Royal Society. When the Second Charter of the Royal Society was adopted in 1663, Talbot was appointed to the governing Council. In 1667, he presented a paper on Swedish stone, which affords sulphur, vitriol, allum and minium.

== Later life ==
When Parliament was dissolved in 1678, he did not stand again, and retired from active politics. As a long-time Stuart loyalist, he was appointed Deputy Lieutenant of Wiltshire by James II in 1688. After the November 1688 Glorious Revolution, both he and his nephew Sir John Talbot refused to swear allegiance to the new regime of Mary II and William III, and lost their positions as a result.

In his later years, he lived at Lacock Abbey, where he died in 1695, and later buried in the family vault at Salwarpe. He had never married.

== Sources ==
- Bell, Gary M (1990). A Handlist of British Diplomatic Representatives: 1509-1688. Royal Historical society. ISBN 978-0861931231.
- Brydges, Egerton (1812). Collins Peerage of England, Volume V. Rivington and others.
- Crosette, JS P (1983). TALBOT, Sir Gilbert (c.1606-95), of Whitehall and Lacock Abbey, Wilts in The History of Parliament: the House of Commons 1660–1690. Haynes Publishing. ISBN 978-0436192746.
- "Devizes and Winchester, September-October 1645". BCW Project.
- Engberg, Jens (1966). "Royalist finances during the English Civil War 1642–1646". Scandinavian Economic History Review. 14 (2): 73–96. doi:10.1080/03585522.1966.10407649.
- Ferris, John P (1981). TALBOT, Sharington (1577-1642), of Lacock, Wilts. and Salwarpe, Worcs in The History of Parliament: the House of Commons 1588–1603 (Online ed.). CUP. ISBN 978-1107002258.
- Hopper, Andrew (2012). Turncoats and Renegadoes: Changing Sides During the English Civil Wars. OUP. ISBN 978-0199575855.
- Rideal, Rebecca (2017). 1666: Plague, War and Hellfire. John Murray. ISBN 978-1473623545.
- Rushworth, John (1722). The Surrender of Oxford etc in 'Historical Collections of Private Passages of State, Volume VI, 1645-1647.
- Smith, G (2003). The Cavaliers in Exile 1640–1660. AAIA. ISBN 978-1403911681.
- Talbot, Sir Gilbert (1675). A Narrative of the Venetians' tender of Assistance to King Charles the First in his Civil Wars, and the Disappointment of it, as likewise of the Design of Confiscating the English Merchants' Effects in Turkey to His Majesty's use;.
- Talbot, Sir Gilbert (1667). "A description of a Swedish stone, which affords sulphur, vitriol, allum and minium". Philosophical Transactions of the Royal Society of London. 1 (21): 375–376. doi:10.1098/rstl.1665.0140. S2CID 186208541.
- Wedgwood, CV (1958). The King's War, 1641–1647 (2001 ed.). Penguin Classics. ISBN 978-0141390727.
