= Gerard Pietersz Hulft =

Dutch general

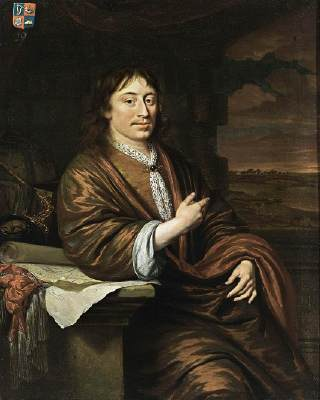
Gerard Hulft by Michiel van Musscher (1677)

Gerard Pietersz Hulft (12 December 1621 in Amsterdam – 10 April 1656 in Colombo), was a Dutch general. In 1655 he was sent with a fleet to Ceylon and died in action.

== Life ==
Hulft was born as the youngest son of the brewer Pieter Hulft, and member of the Civic Guard at the Lastage, a neighborhood near the port of Amsterdam. After concluding his law studies Gerard Hulft was made Secretary to the City Council in 1645, a position he held until 1653. He served under Johan Huydecoper van Maarsseveen, and Cornelis de Graeff. In 1652, a merchant vessel in which he had invested a fortune, was captured by the British. In the ensuing war Hulft hired and kept at his own expense a group of 24 sailors. After the war he lost his job as Secretary due to an administrative conflict with the burgomasters, when he refused to change the wording. He seemed to have been a friend of Govert Flinck, who painted his portrait before his departure to the East.

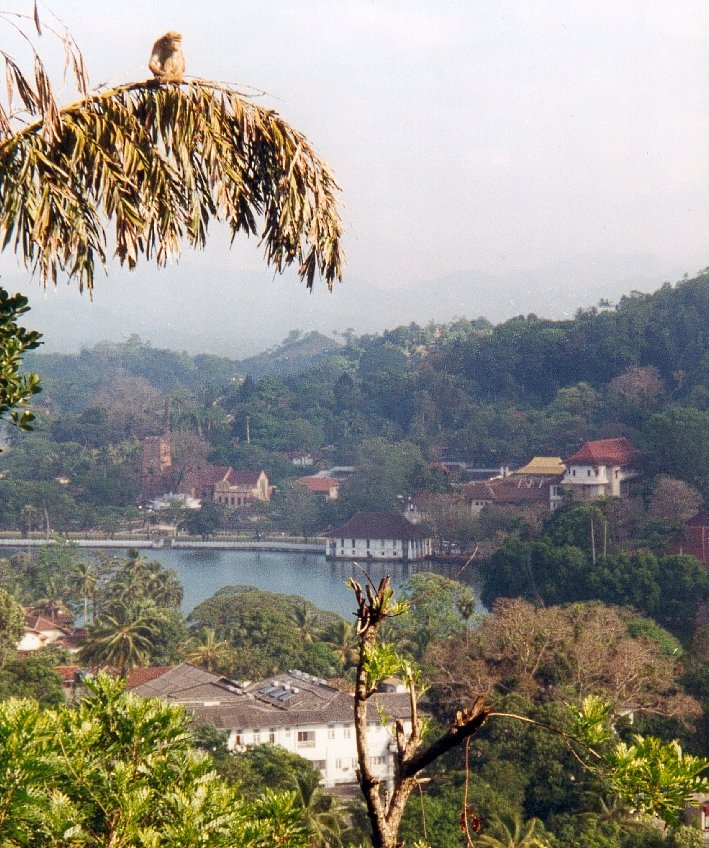
View of the lake from Rajapihilla Mawatha, on the right the golden roof of the Temple of the Tooth, top left a toque macaque

Enlisting with the VOC, where his brother Joan was a governor, he left for Batavia in April 1654, carrying letters nominating him either as Governor-General or Director-General of the Indies. Upon his arrival in Batavia in October, after a six-month journey, he joined the Council of Indies. In August 1655 the shrewd Joan Maetsuycker sent him with eleven ships and 1120 soldiers to Ceylon. His mission was to crush the Portuguese utterly. Hulft arrived in mid-September in Negombo. During his staying in Ceylon he maintained cordial relations with Rajasinghe II of Sri Lanka, the most powerful king of the island.

Hulft marched from Maggona and fought the Portuguese in the vicinity of the Panadura Moya Kata. The Dutch took the fort of Kalutara by surprise and laid siege to the city of Colombo, in October 1655. On their first attack on 12 November, the Dutch lost 300 people, and 350 were seriously wounded. Half a year later Hulft died in action, being hit from the townwall by an arquebus in his right shoulder. This happened a month before the surrender of Colombo and two weeks after his visit to the Royal Palace, as described by the Dutch minister and orientalist Philippus Baldaeus. His corpse was decorated with flowers and fruits and transported to Galle. His ensign Pieter de Bitter brought the news to Batavia.

== See also ==
- Hultsdorf, the legal centre of Colombo

== Bibliography ==
- DE SILVA, Rajpal Kumar, BEUMER, Willemina G. M. Illustrations and views of Dutch Ceylon, 1602-1796: a comprehensive work of pictorial reference with selected eye-witness accounts, London: Serendib Publications, 1988.
- RIBEIRO, João. "História trágica da ilha de Ceilão". Lisboa: Publicações Alfa, Biblioteca da Expansão Portuguesa, 1989
- BALDEUS, Philippus. "A true and exact description of the most celebrated East India coasts of Malabar and Coromandel and also of the isle of Ceylon with their adjacent kingdoms and provinces". Amsterdam: 1672
