= Pieter de Bitter =

Dutch naval officer

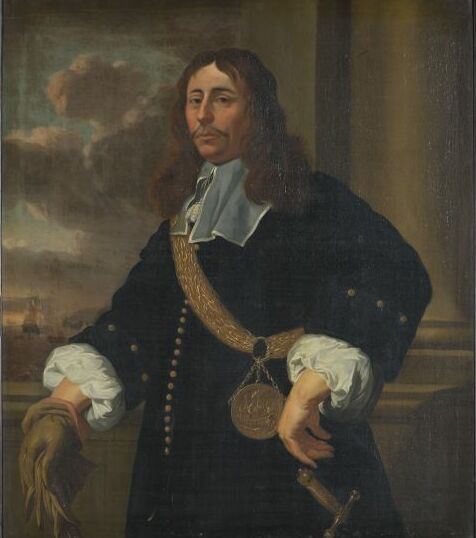
Portrait of Pieter de Bitter

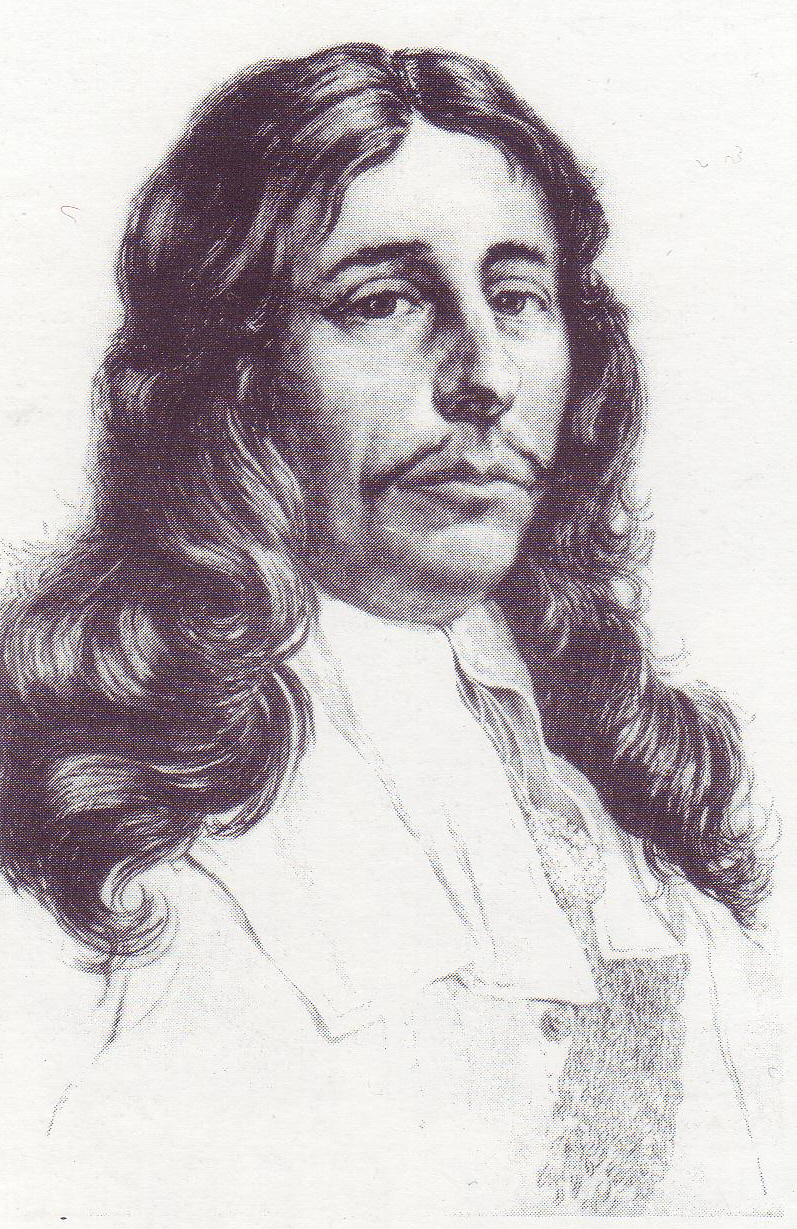
Pieter de Bitter by J.W. Bloem

Pieter de Bitter (c. 1620 – 15 June 1666) was a 17th-century Dutch officer of the Dutch East India Company (Dutch: Vereenigde Oostindische Compagnie, commonly abbreviated to VOC). On 12 August 1665 (New Style) he won the Battle of Vågen against an English flotilla commanded by Thomas Teddeman.

== Early years in the VOC ==
Of Pieter de Bitter's early life and career nothing is known. His name first emerges in 1653, when during the First Anglo-Dutch War he is mentioned as the captain of the Mercurius, a vessel of forty cannon of the Dutch East India Company, that had been allocated to the squadron of Commodore Michiel de Ruyter, just prior to the Battle of Scheveningen. In that fight De Bitter distinguished himself by disabling English ship Triumph of 62 guns, the flagship of Vice-Admiral James Peacock who was killed. An hour later the Mercurius sank after having been penetrated below the waterline; De Bitter was saved with most of his crew.

In August 1655, during the Dutch–Portuguese War, De Bitter was flagcaptain on the Ter Goes of Director-General Gerard Pietersz Hulft, who commanded a fleet attacking the Portuguese colony of Ceylon from Batavia, the main stronghold of the Dutch East Indies. After Colombo had been taken, De Bitter was in July 1656 sent on a galiot back to Batavia to inform the Council of the Indies of the good news – and bring the sad tidings that Hulft had been killed in action.

== Blockade ==
In November 1656, De Bitter was made Vice-Commandeur, under Commandeur Adriaan Roothaas, of a fleet sent to blockade the Portuguese ports on the coast of Malabar. In the spring of 1657 he returned to Batavia; in August that year he again served under Roothaas on a flotilla blockading Goa. De Bitter's flagship Terschelling captured the Santa Cruz loaded with spices. De Bitter embezzled some of the cargo, for which he would later be lightly punished.

The flotilla having been joined by the main force of Colonel Rijcklof van Goens in November, it was decided to split off a large part of the fleet to attack the remaining Portuguese possessions on Ceylon. De Bitter was also used for this expedition, now commanding a larger ship, the Salamander. This ship and the Naarden had the mission to mislead the Portuguese by first sailing to the north and only afterwards rejoin the main force leaving for Ceylon. This ruse failed, however, because adverse winds drove the vessels towards the Maldives. De Bitter only reached Colombo on 17 February 1658, too late to contribute to the capture of Manaar. However he participated in the fall of Jaffnapatnam on 21 June. Again he was used as a messenger to the council.

On 19 July 1659, De Bitter, still serving under Roothaas, departed on a fleet of thirteen headed for Goa, on the yacht Tholen. Blockading the port De Bitter confiscated an English vessel, the Constantinople Merchant, on accusations of carrying contraband.

== Commandeur ==
In April 1661, De Bitter was appointed both Surveyor of the Ships and Master of Naval Ordnance in Batavia. On 22 July he was appointed Commandeur of a fleet sent to, again, blockade Goa. On 7 January 1663, he was present when Goens captured Kochi. De Bitter functioned as temporary governor of this city. On 12 May 1664, he returned to Batavia; on 21 June he was sent as an envoy to the court of the King of Siam, Narai the Great, and managed to secure a renewal of the Dutch – Siamese treaty on 22 August, returning on 30 November to Batavia.

In December De Bitter was appointed commandeur of a Return Fleet. Twice each year the company sent back spices to the Dutch Republic. As the Second Anglo-Dutch War threatened, it was decided to let an experienced officer command the treasure-laden fleet, which had been made as valuable as possible to assist the fatherland. It was of the utmost importance that this shipment did not fall into enemy hands and De Bitter had received secret instructions to avoid this. En route he learned that war had broken out and that the Dutch home fleet had been defeated in the Battle of Lowestoft. New instructions by the States General of the Netherlands ordered him to seek refuge in the neutral port of Bergen in Norway. There, on 12 August 1665, he was attacked by an English flotilla under Thomas Teddeman. De Bitter managed to inspire his crews to an effective defence and in the ensuing Battle of Vågen beat off the attack. His ships inflicted 421 casualties on Teddeman's flotilla but suffered 108 men killed or wounded.

After being relieved by the Dutch home fleet commanded by Lieutenant-Admiral De Ruyter, De Bitter returned to the Republic and was rewarded by the States-General. He was also given two honorary golden chains by the directorate of the company and on 6 March 1666, was appointed commandeur of the next fleet headed for the Indies. De Bitter was anxious to return, as his wife and children lived in Batavia. Departing on 15 April, he died aboard his flagship the Hollandse Tuin on 15 June from scurvy, off the west coast of Africa.
