= Battle of Vågen =

1665 naval battle between the Dutch Republic and England

Coordinates: 60°23′52″N 5°19′2″E

- Part of Second Anglo-Dutch War
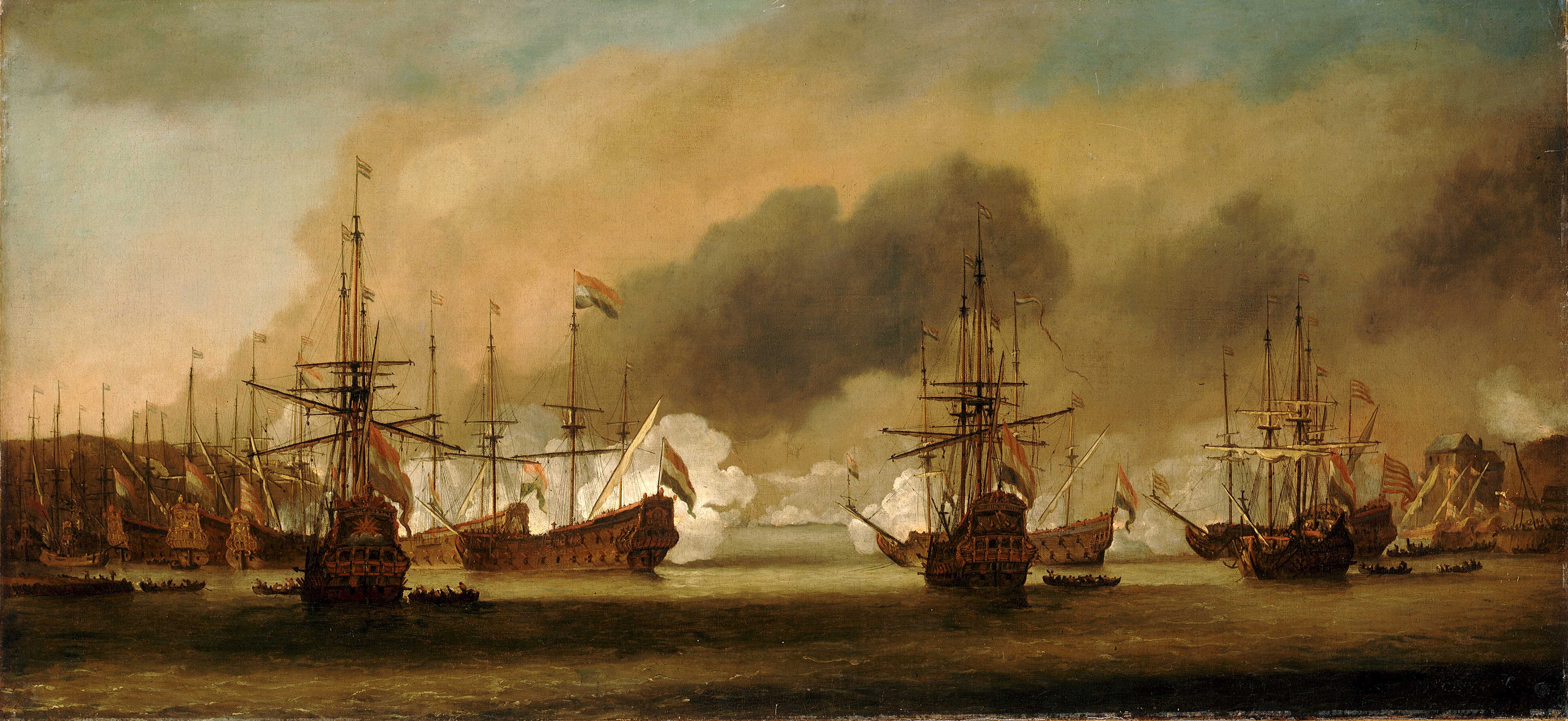
- The attack on the Norwegian port of Bergen on Tuesday, August 12, 1665.
Date	2 August 1665
Location	Bergen, Norway
Result	Dutch victory

Belligerents
Dutch Republic	England

Commanders and leaders
Pieter de Bitter	Thomas Teddeman

Units involved
See § Order of battle Bergenhus Regiment	See § Order of battle

Strength
8 warships	14 warships

Casualties and losses
108 killed or wounded	421 killed and wounded

The Battle of Vågen was a naval battle between a Dutch merchant and treasure fleet and an English flotilla of warships on 2 August 1665 as part of the Second Anglo-Dutch War. The battle took place in Vågen (meaning "the bay, voe" in Norwegian), the main port area of neutral Bergen, Norway. Due to a delay in orders, the Norwegian commanders took the side of the Dutch, contrary to the secret intentions of the King of Norway and Denmark. The battle ended with the retreat of the English fleet, which was much damaged but had lost no ships. The treasure fleet was relieved by the Dutch home fleet 17 days later.

== Arrival in Bergen ==
The Dutch merchant fleet had about 60 vessels. Ten of them were Dutch East India Company (VOC) vessels, commanded by Commodore Pieter de Bitter, which were returning from the East Indies. Twice each year, the Dutch East India Company sent a Return Fleet back to the Netherlands. This one had departed on Christmas Day 1664 and had the richest cargo ever seen until then. It was laden with many luxury goods, typical for the "rich trade": spices, including 4,000,000 catty of pepper, 440,000 pounds of clove, 314,000 pounds of nutmeg, 121,600 pounds of mace, and about 500,000 pounds of cinnamon; 18,000 pounds of ebony; 8,690 catty of silk and about 200,000 other pieces of cloth; 2,000 pounds of indigo; 18,151 pearls; 2,933 rubies, 3,084 raw diamonds, and 16,580 pieces of porcelain. The total European market value was about eleven million guilders, or three million rigsdaler, more than the total annual revenues of the Danish-Norwegian crown.

To avoid the English fleet that controlled the English Channel after its victory in the Battle of Lowestoft, the merchant fleet had sailed north of Scotland to reach the Dutch Republic via the North Sea. After having been dispersed by a storm on 29 June, most ships gathered in the neutral Bergen harbour for shelter in July to wait for the repair of the Dutch home fleet after its defeat. The first three VOC vessels, the yacht Kogge (cargo purchase value: 67,972 guilders), the fluyt Diemermeer (cargo value 272,087 guilders), and Jonge Prins (cargo value: 438,407 guilders) arrived on 19 July (Julian calendar). On 29 July another seven vessels entered the harbour: Walcheren (cargo value 346,964 guilders), Phoenix (cargo value 297,326 guilders), Slot Hooningen (cargo value 386,122 guilders), Brederode (cargo value 296,773 guilders), the yacht Rijzende Zon (cargo value 288,400 guilders), and the fluyts Wapen van Hoorn (cargo value 300,464 guilders) and Amstelland (cargo value 282,785 guilders). Not all of the VOC fleet was present: the Muskaatboom (cargo value: 293,688 guilders) had disappeared in a storm near Madagascar, and the yacht Nieuwenhoven (cargo value: 77,251 guilders) and the fluyt Ooievaar (cargo value: 300,246 guilders) had found refuge in Trondheim. Except for Diemermeer and Amstelland, the Dutch ships were heavily armed, and many were specially-built company vessels with the dual function of warship and merchantman.

The English battle fleet on 4 July became present in the North Sea to intercept the squadron of Vice-Admiral Michiel de Ruyter, which was about to arrive from America after he had raided the English possessions there. The English fleet learned about the arrival of the first ships of the VOC fleet, which had been announced by the English ambassador in the Republic, George Downing, from a merchantman from Rostock on 22 July. This caused a heated discussion about which target should have priority. The fleet commander, Lord Sandwich, against the advice of most of his flag officers, decided to split the fleet. On 30 July, after a merchantman from Ostend had reported the other VOC ships had also arrived, a small task force was dispatched to Bergen to capture or at least block the convoy. The flotilla under Rear-Admiral Thomas Teddeman first had 22 warships but was reduced to 14 after eight ships sailed too westerly, were swept beyond Bergen and could not beat up the wind to the south. Besides the gunships, the fireships Bryar, Greyhound, and Martin Gally were present. Teddeman reached Bergen at six in the evening of 1 August and blocked the entry to the bay. The beginning of the English action was inauspicious: Teddeman's flagship Revenge ran aground that same evening at Cape Nordnes, and it was only by much effort that it managed to work itself free. The entrance of the bay being only about 400 m wide, the English could position only seven ships there: from north to south Prudent Mary, Breda, Foresight, Bendish, Happy Return, Sapphire and Pembroke. The others pointed their guns at the coastal batteries.

== Missed orders ==
At Vågen, the fortresses of Bergenhus and Sverresborg guarded the harbour. Representatives from both fleets approached Johan Caspar von Cicignon, commandant of the fortresses, and Claus von Ahlefeldt, the commander of the Norwegian forces at Bergen. The Norwegians decided to remain out of the dispute for the time. Ahlefeldt had heard rumours of a secret deal between King Charles II of England and King Frederick III of Denmark-Norway, but no concrete orders had arrived. By treaty, a force of five warships of any nation might enter the harbour, and Ahlefeldt indicated that he would allow nothing else.

In fact, a secret oral agreement had been made a week earlier between the English envoy, Sir Gilbert Talbot, and Frederick III. Denmark-Norway would allow the English fleet to assault the Dutch convoy, and the loot would be shared in equal parts, despite the official alliance of Frederick with the Dutch. Frederick sent an order to Ahlefeldt that he should protest the English attack but take no action against it.

However, the order did not reach Bergen in time. The English sent an order to their fleet to postpone their attack until Ahlefeldt had received his orders, but the messenger was intercepted en route by the Dutch. Teddeman had, however, been told that a deal was in the making.

Both Charles and Frederick hoped to get the loot for their personal funds, not for their official national treasuries. Charles had instructed Lord Sandwich in a personal secret meeting to arrange for that. That made Lord Sandwich send his namesake nephew, the courtier and adventurer Edward Montagu (1635–1665), with Teddeman to ensure everything would proceed according to plan. Teddeman had been ordered to act as quickly and forcefully as possible to avoid an involvement of the main English fleet, which would compromise secrecy.

== Eve of battle ==
When Teddeman sent Montagu to Bergen to co-ordinate the attack, to his great disappointment, the Danish-Norwegian commanders refused to co-operate. At 4 in the morning, Montagu returned but was immediately sent back by Teddeman, and threatened to attack the fortresses if they remained obstinate. Montagu claimed the English fleet had 2,000 cannon and 6,000 men, which made little impression, as he was obviously exaggerating the size by about three times. He also offered the Order of the Garter in exchange for compliance, which also made little impression. When he was again refused, Montagu made a little detour and let his boat row alongside the Dutch fleet to inspect their preparations. The Dutch responded to his presence by having their musicians play the Wilhelmus and saluting Montagu three times with white smoke. His vessel saluted back.

Meanwhile, Bergen was in an uproar, as sailors from Teddeman's fleet had entered the city. Many citizens fled, and De Bitter hastily called back the Dutch crews, most of whom on shore leave in Bergen, by ringing the church bells. As few of them had much fighting experience and many were not even Dutch, he raised their spirits by promising three months of extra wages in case of a victory. Such promises were legally binding under Dutch law, and the news was met with great enthusiasm. He ended his speech by asking, "Do you have the courage to stand up to the enemy or not?" The men, according to the Dutch reports, cheered, "Yes, sir! We'll remain firm until we'll have defeated the enemy and rather die than surrender such rich treasure or ourselves to the English!"

Most Dutch ships were very deep in the bay. At about 300 meters from the English line, De Bitter positioned from north to south the Slot Hooningen, Catherina, his flagship the Walcheren, the Gulden Phenix and the Rijzende Zon. Thousands of sailors from the lighter Dutch ships were sent to reinforce the fortresses.

== Battle ==
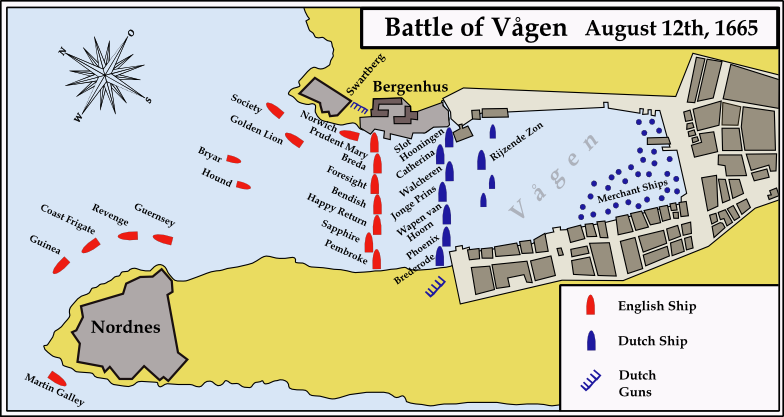
Battle site.

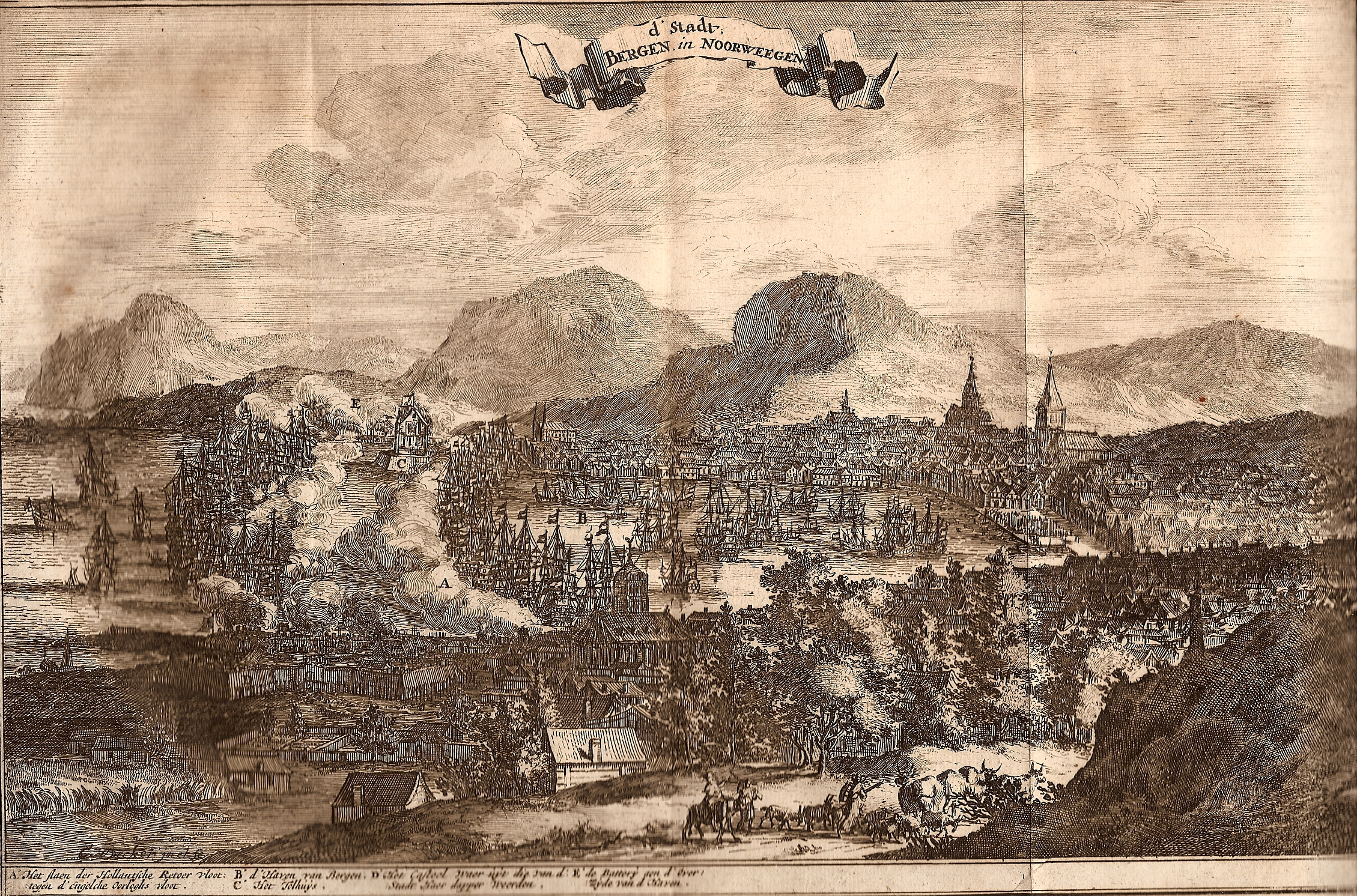
Wouter Schouten depiction of the battle, from 1666, p. 214

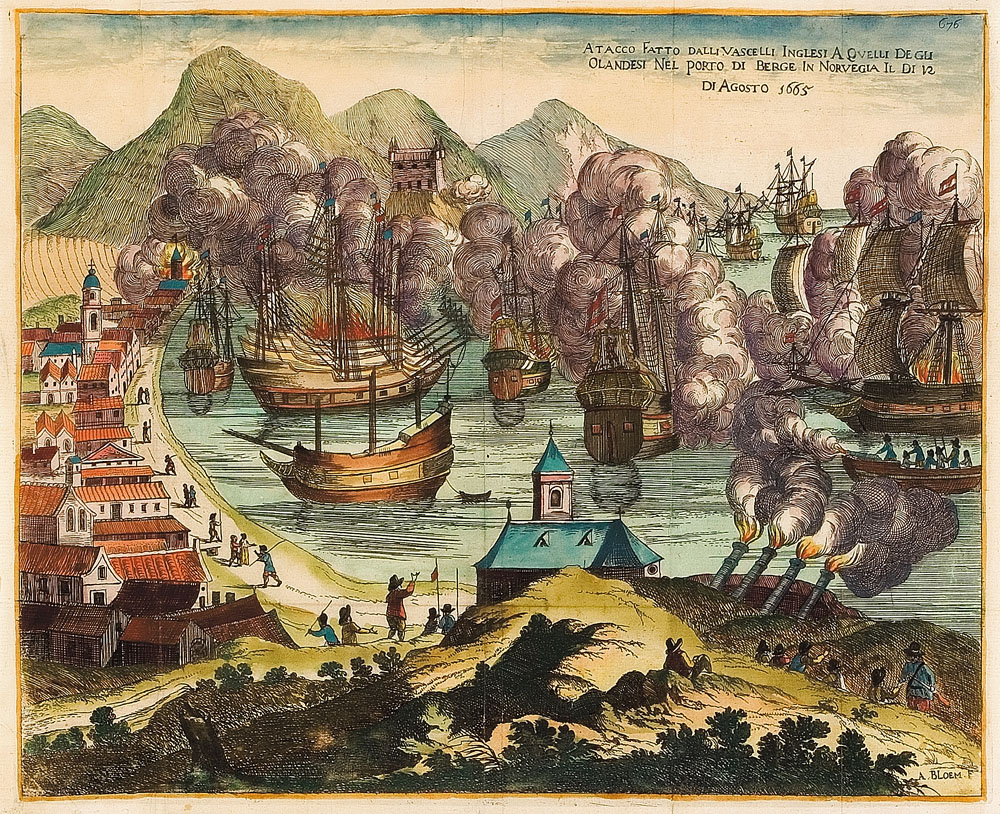
Battle Scene.

Early in the morning, the English beat their drums and sounded their trumpets, and the Dutch knew hostilities would soon begin. Their crews bared their heads for a short prayer and then hastily manned the guns.

When cannon fire erupted at six in the morning of 2 August (Old Style), both fleets engaged at only hundreds of metres distance of each other. Teddeman decided against using fireships to avoid endangering the precious cargo. He also lacked the weather gage and simply could not execute a direct attack. The Dutch had positioned their eight heaviest ships so that they could give broadsides at the English. Most smaller guns had been moved to point at the enemy, as manoeuvring would have been impossible anyway. The English fleet was in a leeward position and so had a better range, but the English gunners overcompensated for that and so their shots mostly fell short. Fierce southern winds and rain blew the smoke from the English guns back to the ships, which blinded them, and they were unaware that the Dutch ships were rarely hit. As Bergen protrudes somewhat into the bay from the north, the most-northern English vessels had to shoot just along it to reach the Dutch. A stray English cannon shot landed in the fortress and killed four soldiers. The commandant responded by firing back at the English fleet.

The English fleet had about 600 cannon and 2000 men and was in itself far superior to the Norwegian arsenal, which had only 125 guns and 200-300 men. However, the ships facing the Dutch were poorly positioned to answer the Norwegian fire. Besides, most English vessels were frigates and unable to take as much damage as the large Dutch merchantmen, and the Dutch actually had some superiority in firepower. Teddeman had hoped that Dutch morale would quickly break and made the mistake not to break off action when that failed to happen. After three hours of being pounded, the English blocking ships were routed. Their panicked crews cut the anchor ropes, but some ships remained entangled and threatened to capsize because of the weight of the broken masts and so they had to anchor again under fire to cut them off. The English were forced to retreat to Herdla at around 10 o'clock in the morning.

The English had 421 casualties: 112 dead (among them most of the captains of the blocking ships) and 309 wounded. Andrew Marvell wrote in his long ironic poem about the "Dutch War":

Six Captains bravely were shot,
And Mountagu, though drest like any bride,
Aboard the Admiral, was reacht, and died

The "reached" was a sneer from Marvell and alluded to Teddeman's failure to place his flagship in the blocking line though it was by far the most powerful ship that he could use.

In the biography of John Wilmot, 2nd Earl of Rochester, the story is told that Rochester, Montagu and George Windham, three young noblemen, had had a strong premonition of their death. They made a pact that whoever should perish first would appear to the other in spirit form. Late in the battle, George suddenly began to shake with fear. Edward embraced him for consolation, and both were then slain by the same cannonball.

The Dutch convoy suffered some damage to its ships, especially the Catherina, a Mediterranean fleet vessel, and about 25 dead and seventy wounded. Eight men died in the fortress, and another ten died in the city.

=== Order of battle ===
United Provinces

Ship name
Commander
Guns
Notes
Slot Hooningen
Herman de Ruyter
60

Catharina
Ruth Maximilian
40
Ran aground
Walcheren
Pieter de Bitter
60 - 70

Jonge Prins
Jacob Jochemszoon
60 - 66

Gulden Phenix
Jacob Burckhorst
65

Rijzende Zon
Unknown
50

Kogge
Luyt Pieterszoon
45

Wapen van Hoorn
Pieter Willemszoon van Weesp
60 - 66

England

Ship name
Commander
Guns
Notes
Prudent Mary
Thomas Haward
28

Breda
Thomas Seale
40 - 48

Foresight
Packington Brooks
34 - 48

Bendish
Robert Taylor
42

Happy Return
James Lambert
52

Sapphire
Thomas Elliot
36 - 40

Pembroke
Richard Cotton
22 - 34

Guernsey
John Utber
22 - 30

Revenge
Thomas Teddiman
60

Golden Lion
William Dale
42

Society
Ralph Lascelles
44

Norwich
John Wetwang
24 - 30

Guinea
Thomas Room Coyle
34 - 40

== Aftermath ==
The orders from Copenhagen reached Ahlefeldt six days later, on 8 August. With the Dutch merchant vessels still in Bergen, Ahlefeldt travelled to the English fleet at Herdla the next day to try to repair the damage and offered a chance to attack again without interference from the fortress. The offer was rejected, however, as Teddeman knew he could not be ready before the actions of the main fleets had already decided the outcome of the entire enterprise. Also, Ahlefeldt refused to attack the Dutch himself. In the days after the battle, the Dutch had strongly fortified their position: a defensive chain had been positioned in the entry of the bay and their sailors had improved the fortifications by adding another 100 guns.

As the wind turned north, they expected a direct attack from Teddeman, but the English rear-admiral had rejoined with the eight vessels that had separated but limited himself to observing the harbour. On 10 August, he left to join the main fleet, but it had already been forced by lack of supplies to depart for England on 6 August since it was ignorant that it had failed to intercept De Ruyter.

On 13 August, Sandwich, learning that De Ruyter had reached the Republic on 27 July, took sea again and sailed to the east but failed to meet Teddeman's flotilla, only thirty miles to the north of him. Both English forces were unaware of each other and of the fact that less than fifty miles east of them, De Ruyter was heading north since on arrival, he had been appointed lieutenant-admiral and supreme commander of the rebuilt combined Dutch fleet. It was now out in force with 93 warships, 20 yachts, 12 fireships, 15,051 sailors, 4583 marines and 4337 cannons. Again returning to England, Sandwich joined Teddeman near Flamborough Head on 18 August, anchored at Solebay on the 22nd to resupply and departed on the 28th.

On 19 August, De Ruyter's relief fleet had arrived at Bergen. On 23 August, he left again to shield a planned escape by the merchant fleet, but adverse gales forced him to return two days later. It was only on 29 August that the Dutch merchant fleet left the harbour. The next day, the convoy of 184 ships was struck by a hurricane that lasted till the afternoon of 1 September and completely dispersed it. When the storm subsided, De Ruyter had only 37 warships and eight merchantmen with him. Sandwich, now east of De Ruyter, managed to intercept and take on 3 September a straggling group of four warships (Zevenwolden, Westvriesland, Groningen and Hoop) and, much more importantly, two VOC vessels (Slot Hooningen and Gulden Phenix). They would again be lost by them during the Raid on the Medway.

Receiving the false news that De Ruyter was east of him with the mass of the Dutch fleet, Lord Sandwich retreated to the west to bring his prizes to safety, again narrowly missing De Ruyter by moving to the east. Montague would afterwards be severely criticised, as he had lost an excellent opportunity to destroy the Dutch in detail or at least to capture more of the treasure ships.

On 9 September, however, he managed to intercept and to capture a second group with two WIC vessels, four warships and seven fluyt naval supply ships. After breaking off a chase of another 30 vessels, for fear of the shoals of the Frisian Isles, he finally returned to Solebay on 11 September. The other Dutch vessels returned to the Dutch Republic safely and were mostly reassembled by De Ruyter.

For the English, the escape of the Dutch Return Fleet from the Indies was an enormous blow since they had to capture it to finance the war. However, the blow was somewhat softened by the later capture of the two VOC merchantmen. Lord Sandwich was blamed for the failure and fell into disgrace. After his arrival in the Thames he illegally, perhaps with connivance of Charles, took goods of considerable value from the hulls of the captured Slot Hooningen and Gulden Phenix, sold them in secret and divided the gain among his nine flag officers and reserved for himself £4000. When that came to light, Charles had no choice but to cashier him, but Sandwich defended his conduct by pointing out that he had taken only a small part of the booty, the value of which was estimated by him at £500,000. Samuel Pepys thus described the impression of wealth when he visited one of the captured ships in his diary entry of 16 November: "So I on board my Lord Bruncker; and there he and Sir Edmund Pooly carried me down into the hold of the India shipp, and there did show me the greatest wealth lie in confusion that a man can see in the world. Pepper scattered through every chink, you trod upon it; and in cloves and nutmegs, I walked above the knees; whole rooms full. And silk in bales, and boxes of copper-plate, one of which I saw opened... which was as noble a sight as ever I saw in my life...".

Lord Sandwich also thought that he had been tricked by the Danish-Norwegian King, as Pepys recounted in his diary entry of 18 September: "But the main thing my Lord wonders at, and blames the Dane for, is, that the blockhead, who is so much in debt to the Hollander, having now a treasure more than much than all his Crowne was worth, and that which would for ever have beggared the Hollander, should not take this time to break with the Hollander, and thereby pay his debt that must have been forgiven him and have got the greatest treasure into his hands that ever was together in the world". In February 1666, Denmark-Norway would declare war against England after the former had received large Dutch subsidies. Pieter de Bitter received an honorary golden chain from the States-General.

One reaction to the battle was the construction of an additional fortress, Fredriksberg Fortress (on Nordnes), since the battle "showed clearly how vulnerable the city really was", according to Bjørn Arvid Bagge.

== Legacy ==
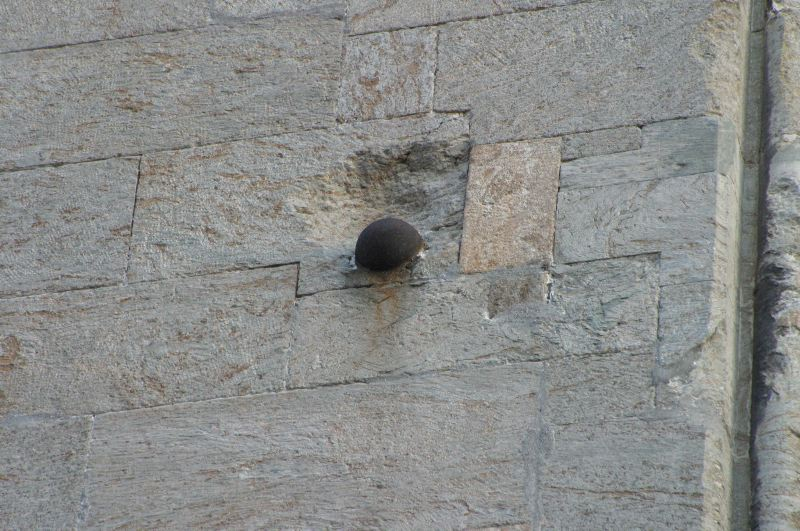
The cannonball embedded in the wall of Bergen Cathedral.

The Bergen Cathedral still has a cannonball from the battle imbedded in the wall of its tower. In 2015, a plaquette was unveiled on a wall of the cathedral; an information board (infoplate) was unveiled "near Kongestatuen at Bergen[s]hus Fortress". Bergen Maritime Museum has on display part of the decoration on the English vessels. Two wooden figures, depict the head of a lion and the head of a unicorn. In 2015, an exhibition marked the 350th anniversary of the battle: "Konger, krydder og krutt" (kings, spices and gunpowder).

A painting was done by Willem van de Velde the Younger and is in the National Maritime Museum, Greenwich, London.

== Sources ==
Bergen Cathedral

- Vrakrestene etter slaget på Vågen (Wreckage after the battle of Vågen) Article in Bergens Tidende, 7 January 2005. (in Norwegian)
- Steen, Sverre (1969). Bergen - byen mellom fjellene. Bergen.
- Slag in de Baai van Bergen, 12 augustus 1665 (in Dutch)
- Warnsinck, JCM, Van Vlootvoogden en Zeeslagen, PN van Kampen & Zoon, 1940
- List of sailing warships
