= Second Anglo-Dutch War =

Naval conflict from 1665 to 1667

- Part of the Anglo-Dutch Wars
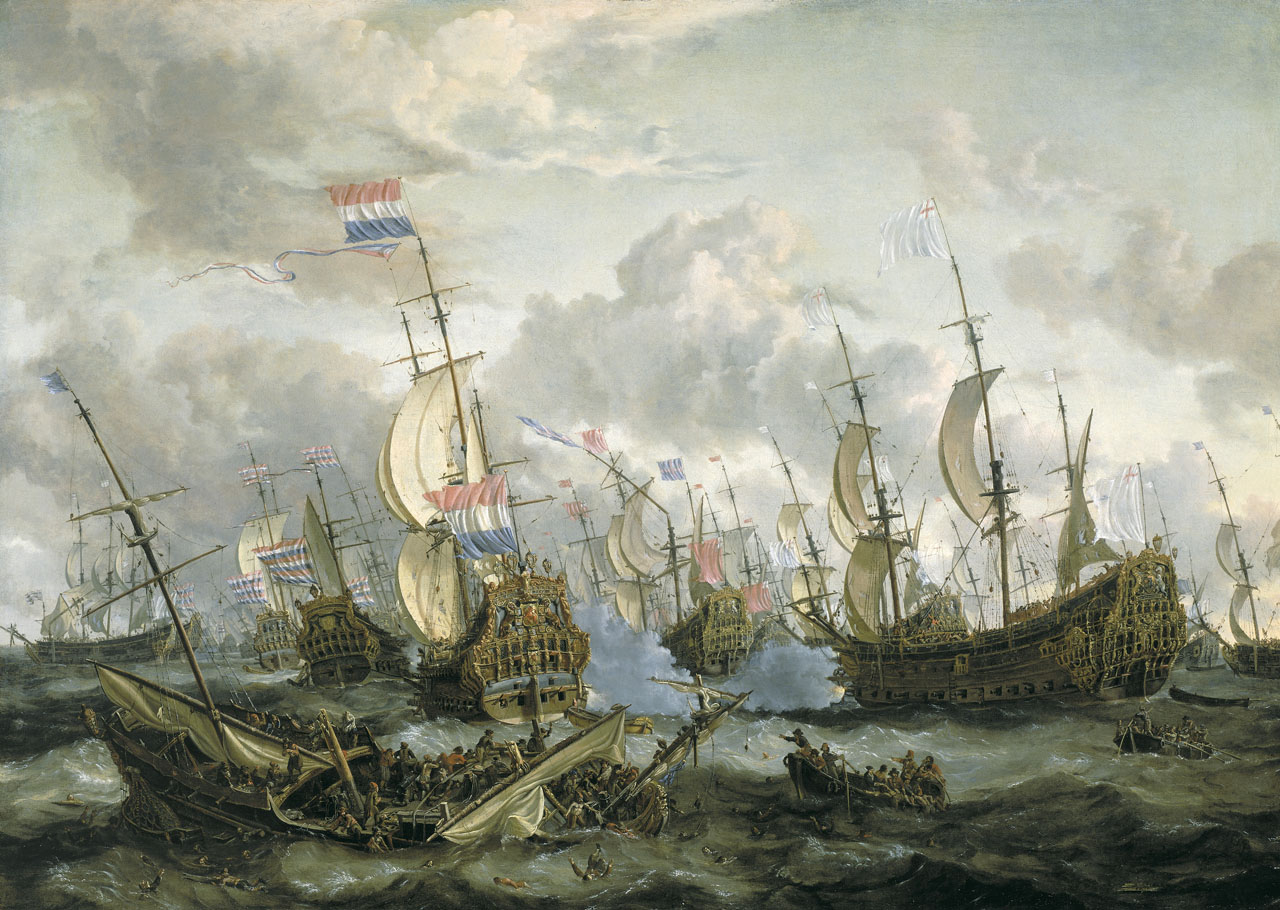
- The Four Days' Battle, 1–4 June 1666, by Abraham Storck
Date	4 March 1665 – 31 July 1667
Location	North Sea, English Channel, North America, West Africa, East Indies, The Guianas, and the Caribbean
Result	Treaty of Breda (1667)
Territorial changes	Dutch Republic cedes New Amsterdam to England; England cedes English Guiana, Fort Amsterdam, Ghana, and Run to the Dutch Republic

Belligerents
Dutch Republic; Denmark–Norway; France	England; Scotland; Bishopric of Münster

Commanders and leaders
Johan de Witt; De Ruyter; Van Wassenaer †; Cornelis de Witt; De Bitter; Van Ghent; Nassau–Siegen; Von Ahlefeldt; Lefèbvre	(England) (Scotland) Charles II; (England) York; (England) Albemarle; (England) Sandwich; (England) Prince Rupert; (England) Teddiman; Von Galen

Strength
131 warships; 53,000 soldiers (Note: This was the strength of the Dutch army in paper on 1667, but it was likely lower in reality. The number also includes 6,000 French auxiliary troops.); 250 men	139 warships; 18,000 Münster soldiers

Casualties and losses
37,000 soldiers killed in action (English and Dutch)	

The Second Anglo-Dutch War (Note: Also known as the Second Dutch War, or Second English War Dutch: Tweede Engelse Oorlog) began on 4 March 1665 and concluded with the signing of the Treaty of Breda on 31 July 1667. It was the second in a series of naval wars fought between England and the Dutch Republic and it was driven largely by commercial rivalry, competition over maritime trade, and disputes over overseas colonies and trading posts.

Despite several major battles, neither side was able to score a decisive victory, and by the end of 1666 the war had reached stalemate. Peace talks made little progress until the Dutch Raid on the Medway in June 1667 forced Charles II to agree to the Treaty of Breda.

By eliminating a number of long-standing issues, the terms eventually made it possible for England and the Dutch Republic to unite against the expansionist policies pursued by Louis XIV of France. In the short-term however, Charles's desire to avenge this setback led to the Third Anglo-Dutch War in 1672.

== Background ==
Despite similar ideologies, (Note: Both were Protestant republics, while England had supported the Dutch Republic in its Eighty Years War with Spain) commercial disputes and political differences between the Dutch Republic and Commonwealth of England led to the 1652 to 1654 First Anglo-Dutch War. The treaty that ended the war failed to address these issues, which included Dutch opposition to the 1651 Navigation Acts, and English objections to Dutch trading monopolies. Even when the two countries were at peace, competition for markets in the East Indies and elsewhere often resulted in conflict outside Europe. For various reasons, factions in both countries hampered efforts to reach resolution through diplomatic means.

From 1650 to 1672, Dutch politics was dominated by the States Party and their leader, Grand pensionary Johan de Witt. Despite suspicions about Charles II's links to their Orangist opponents, (Note: Born in 1650, the young Prince of Orange was Charles's nephew and son of his sister Mary; despite his years of exile in the Republic, Charles disliked the Dutch, and objected to De Witt's refusal to extradite English republicans and other dissidents who took refuge there) De Witt viewed the 1660 Stuart Restoration as an opportunity to rebuild relationships. He hoped to negotiate overlapping defensive agreements with England and France to ensure peace, and continued Dutch economic dominance.

However, the English saw little benefit in preserving this system, and wanted concessions the Dutch were not prepared to grant. When merchants in the City of London demanded increased Protectionism, Charles II renewed the Navigation Acts in August 1660, then strengthened them further in 1663. Parliament claimed they were simply responding to measures taken by the Dutch East India Company, or VOC, to enforce its monopolies in Asia, (Note: The huge profits from Asian spices led to conflict even in times of peace, as the VOC created, then enforced, their monopoly over production and trade. By 1663, indigenous and European competitors like the Portuguese had been eliminated, the only gap in the VOC monopoly being English nutmeg plantations on Run, which were finally destroyed by the Dutch in late 1664) and by the Dutch West India Company, or WIC, in West Africa.

For Charles, expanding the economy was another way to reduce his financial dependence on Parliament, preferably using royal monopolies or charters to do so. In 1660, he and his brother James founded the Royal African Company, or RAC, whose purpose was to challenge Dutch dominance of the Atlantic slave trade. Investors included senior politicians such as George Carteret, Shaftesbury and Arlington, creating a strong link between the RAC and government policy.

The Atlantic trade was a three way process, whereby slaves from West Africa were transported to Sugar plantations in the Caribbean, which in turn were supplied by colonies in North America. These links meant conflict in one region often led to fighting in all three. In August 1664, the English occupied New Amsterdam, which was renamed New York City. They then took WIC slaving posts in modern Guinea. When these were recaptured by a Dutch fleet under Michiel de Ruyter in early 1665, the RAC was forced into bankruptcy, and its influential investors saw war as the best way to recoup their losses.

In taking these actions, the Dutch were reassured by their 1662 defensive treaty with France, under which Louis XIV agreed to provide military support if they were attacked by England. (Note: Although an Anglo-Dutch treaty was also signed in 1662, its terms were so vague that it was of little value) In return, the Dutch undertook not to interfere with French actions in the Spanish Netherlands, but by 1664, many were concerned by the prospect of having an expansionist France as a neighbour, rather than a weakened Spain. Although it provided another reason to agree terms with England, negotiations made little progress. This was partially due to the complexity of the Dutch political system, which made it difficult to reach consensus between the different provinces and powerful trade groups like the VOC. It also reflected De Witt's belief Parliament would not approve funds for an expensive naval war, a view shared by many English politicians, including Charles's chief minister Lord Clarendon.

For his part, Louis XIV feared an Anglo-Dutch conflict might draw in Spain or the Holy Roman Empire, and impede his efforts to acquire the Spanish Netherlands. He therefore tried to mediate between the two, or at least limit conflict to Africa and the Americas, which would not require France to become involved. Aware of his reluctance, Charles II saw no reason to make concessions, while Sir George Downing, his Ambassador in The Hague, claimed recent financial losses meant the Dutch could not afford a war. Other advisors argued the Franco-Dutch treaty only applied to defensive actions, so provoking the Dutch into declaring war would give Louis XIV the chance to remain neutral. Following English attacks on convoys off Cádiz and in the English Channel, the Dutch declared war on 4 March 1665.

=== Opposing forces and tactics ===
Some historians argue that just as the tactics used by 17th century armies were transformed by the Military Revolution, the Anglo-Dutch Wars marked a similar change in naval practice. The ships on either side have been described as the "most advanced, complex, expensive and manpower-intensive weapons systems of their day". With the fleets involved increasing to over 100 ships per side, maximising firepower required greater levels of organisation, discipline and co-ordination. One solution to these problems was the Line of battle formation.

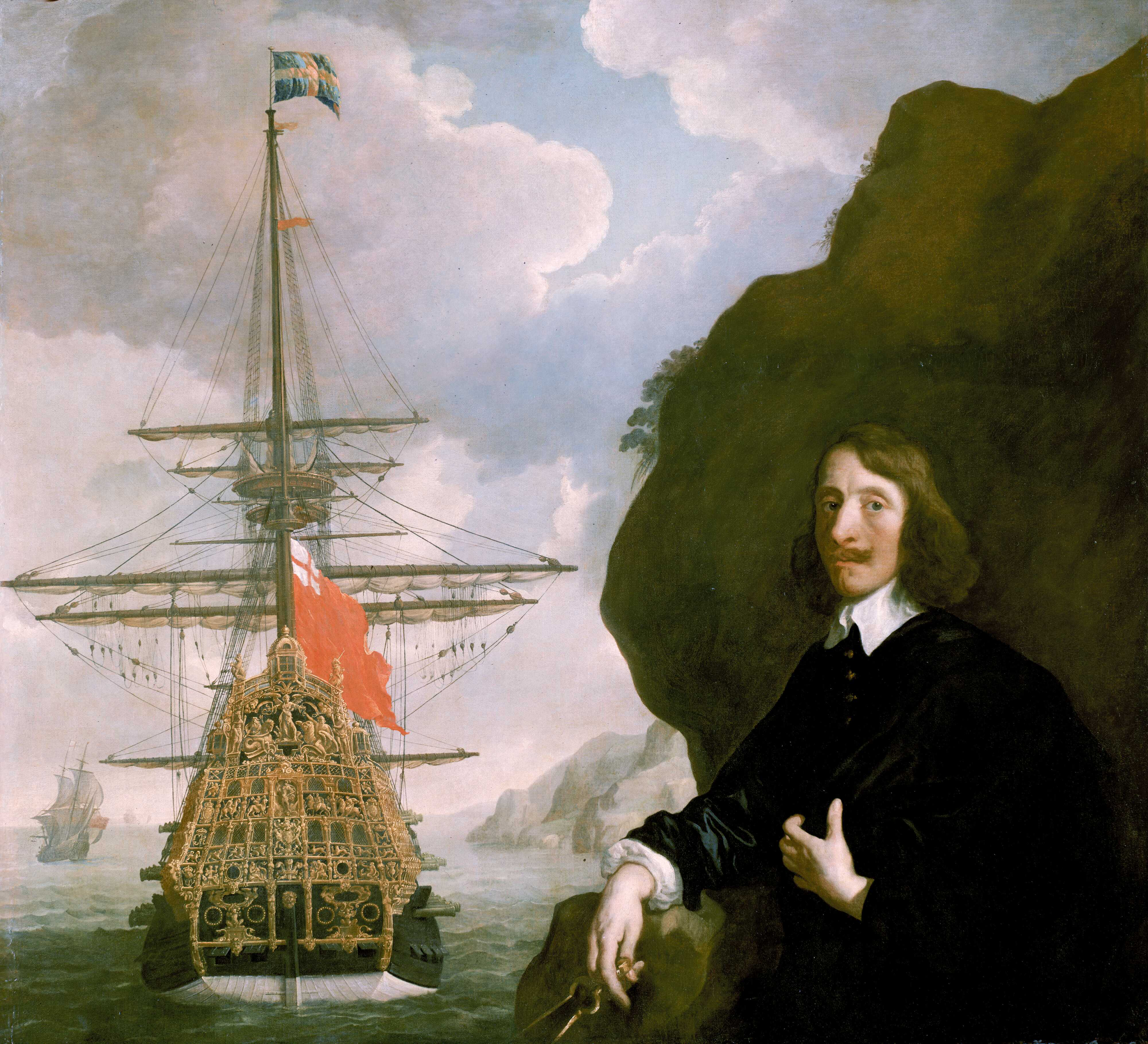
Sovereign, with its architect Peter Pett; built in 1634, it carried over 100 guns, while the largest Dutch ships had a complement of 60 to 70

In 1664, the Royal Navy issued new "Fighting Instructions", formalising the "line of battle" as standard practice. They also established a signalling system allowing commanders to control their fleets, something the Dutch then lacked. Over the course of the war, the formation was employed by both, although it better suited the heavier ships used by the Royal Navy, and its emphasis on gunnery to sink opponents. The Dutch preferred the use of boarding, with individual ships fighting one another.

Difficulties in communicating orders meant during combat many captains focused on avoiding collisions rather than engaging the enemy, making battles chaotic and often indecisive. In addition, both navies consisted of significant numbers of purpose-built warships, bulked out by private merchantmen. Although many of the latter were well-armed, they were often less capable of standing up to sustained fire. Dutch merchant ships were particularly vulnerable to the larger English warships.

Based on lessons learned from the First Anglo-Dutch War, post-1653 the Dutch navy was re-organised around sixty-four newly built and larger Ships of the line, each with between 40 and 60 guns. However, they remained inferior to English vessels such as Sovereign, which carried over 100 guns. In 1664, it was decided to create a new core of sixty even heavier ships of sixty to eighty cannon, which were mostly still under construction when fighting began in 1665. Stronger finances allowed the Dutch to complete these plus another twenty during the war, compared to only a dozen built by England.

Although the Royal Navy was superior in ships and leadership at the beginning of the war, these advantages were gradually eroded by Parliament's reluctance to fund it. Downing, and other observers who argued the Dutch could not afford a war, overlooked recent reforms that improved their credit, and made it relatively easy to raise money. In contrast, English expectations that profits from Dutch ships captured by privateers would cover costs proved unfounded. In December 1664, Parliament approved £2.5 million in taxes for the navy, but much of this was spent on essential repairs, or allegedly stolen by officials. To fund operations, Charles had to rely on short-term loans from the City of London, at ever increasing interest rates. By the end of 1666, lack of money led him to discharge most of the fleet, with disastrous results.

== History ==
=== War ===
==== Europe; 1665 ====
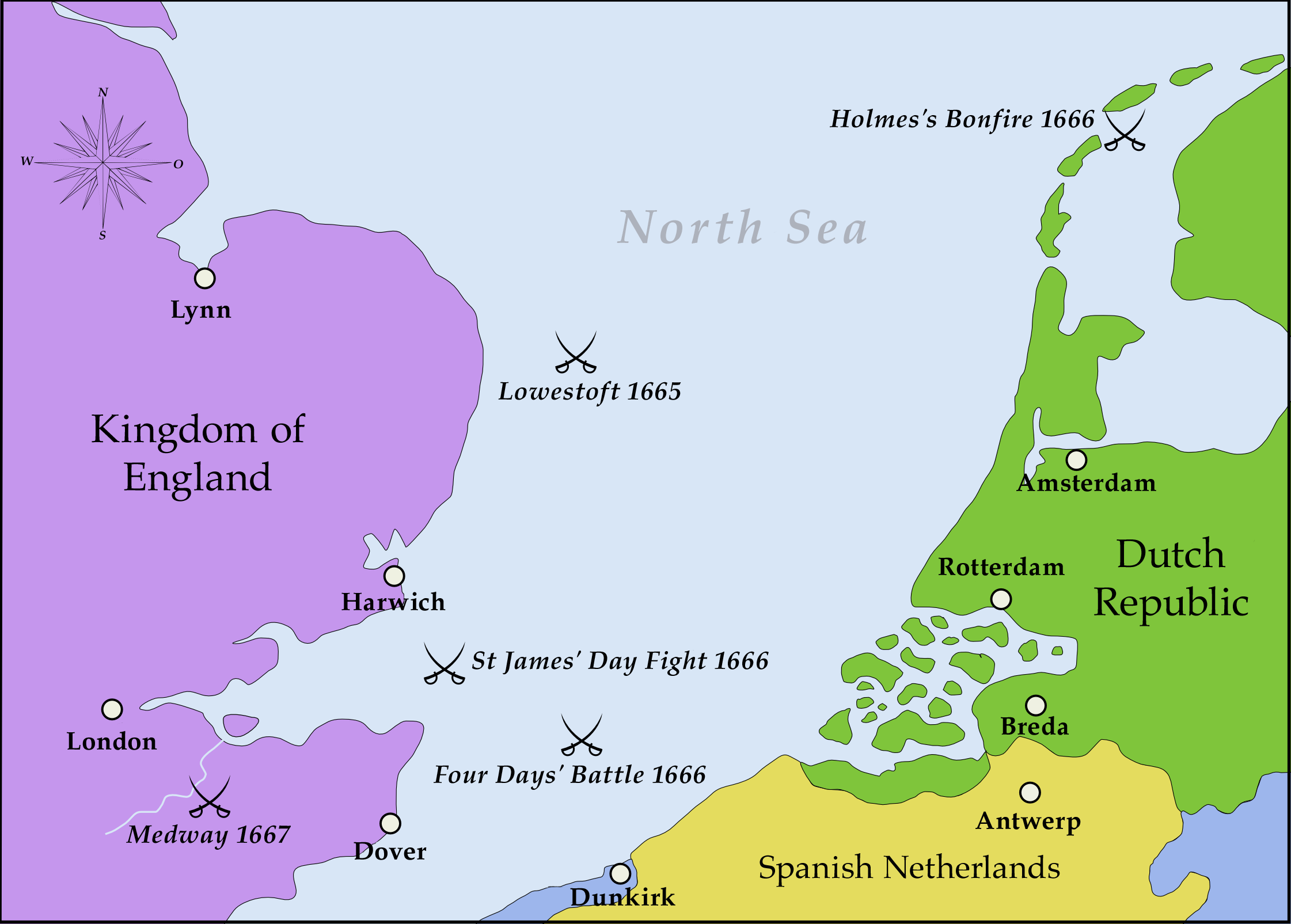
The Second Anglo-Dutch War; key battles

Both sides planned a short war, since the English could not afford a long one, while the Dutch wanted to minimise any potential economic damage. De Witt ordered his naval commander Jacob van Wassenaer to bring the English fleet to battle, although his ships were inferior in organisation, training, discipline and firepower. At the Battle of Lowestoft on 13 June 1665, the Dutch navy suffered the worst defeat in its history, losing some sixteen ships. Most of the fleet escaped, but over 30% of its personnel were killed or captured, with van Wassenaer himself among the dead.

Defeat led to an extensive overhaul of Dutch tactics and command structures, with several captains either executed for alleged cowardice, or dismissed. In July, Michiel de Ruyter became the new commander in chief, and followed the English in formalising the line battle formation. Dutch finances also received a boost when the VOC Spice Fleet returned home safely after the battle of Vågen. This was offset when the eastern province of Overijssel was over-run by troops from Münster under Christoph Bernhard von Galen, who was backed by English subsidies.

Münster's invasion threatened to involve further German states of the Holy Roman Empire in the fighting, and thus provide an excuse for Emperor Leopold to intervene. Concerned by this, Louis sent French soldiers to prevent supplies reaching von Galen's troops. Reports Charles was negotiating an alliance with Spain meant he also stepped up attempts to mediate a settlement, but the English in general remained deeply suspicious of French intentions. (Note: Charles told the French ambassador that while the City of London had loaned him £100,000 to continue the war against the Dutch, they would "pay him four times as much" to fight the French) Although the Dutch offered to renounce their territorial claims in North America, and cede three West African posts, success at Lowestoft prompted Charles to demand further concessions and a Dutch agreement to bear the costs of the war. In December 1665, Louis withdrew his ambassadors from London, signalling his intention to declare war.

Downing now contacted the Orangist party in Overijssel, which had suffered severely from von Galen's invasion, asking that they demand the States General make peace with England. De Witt's position was too strong for this to succeed, and on 11 December he declared the only acceptable peace terms were a return to the status quo ante bellum, or a quick end to hostilities under a uti possidetis clause.

==== Europe; 1666 ====
On 16 January 1666, Louis declared war on England. In return for a large French subsidy, Denmark–Norway did the same in February, effectively closing the Baltic trade to English ships, and with it access to vital naval supplies. The payments promised to von Galen by Charles largely failed to materialise, and when Brandenburg-Prussia threatened to attack Münster, he made peace with the Republic at Cleves in April.

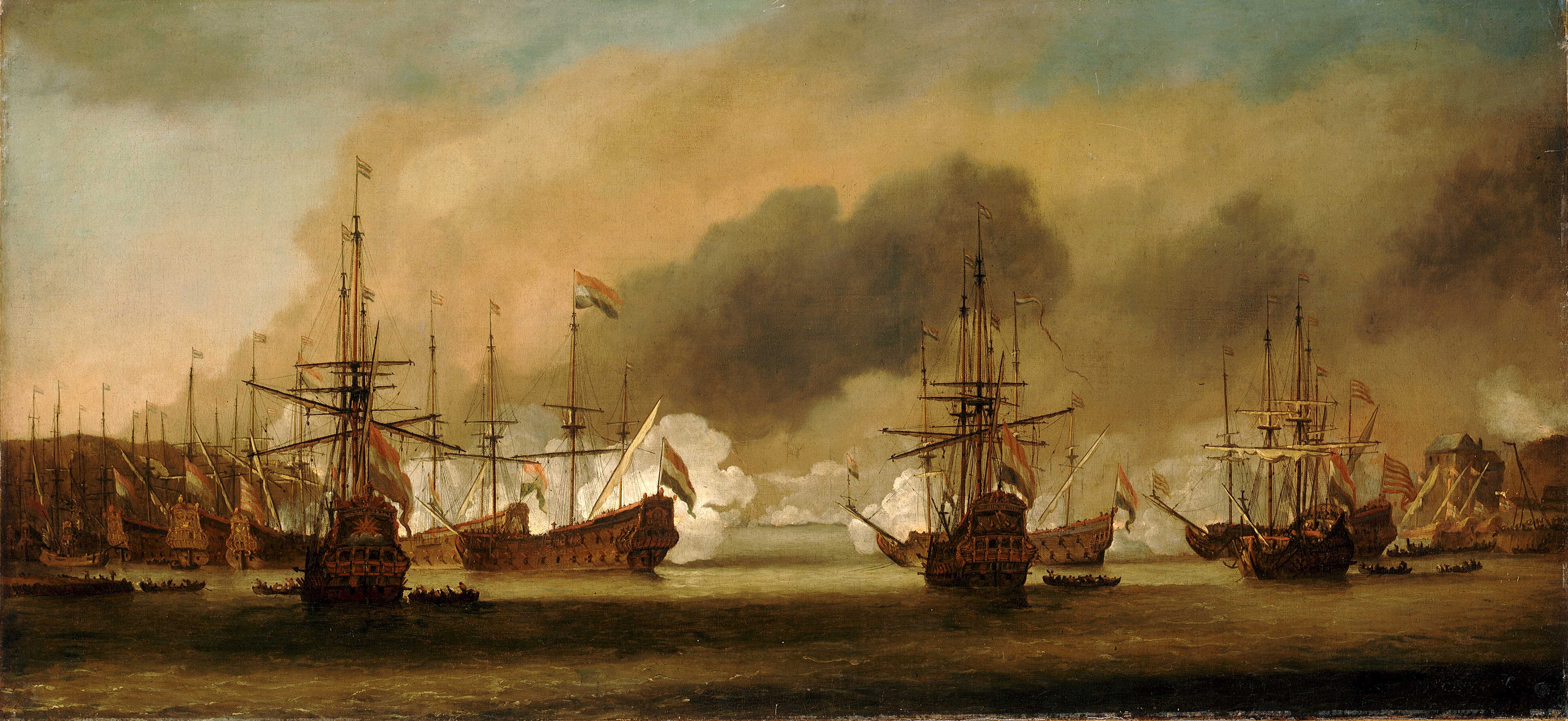
Battle of Vågen, Norway, on 12 August 1665

Anglo-Dutch negotiations had progressed far enough that de Witt invited Charles II to start formal negotiations. Talks made little progress, as both sides felt they were negotiating from a position of strength. Despite the French declaration of war, Charles knew Louis wanted to avoid being dragged into the conflict, and through informal correspondence was aware he considered Dutch demands excessive. By now, the French king had also concluded the Dutch would never voluntarily make the concessions he required in the Spanish Netherlands, and began planning the 1667 War of Devolution.

On the other hand, Dutch morale rose with the completion of thirty new warships, most carrying up to 72 guns, heavier than any available in early 1665. They were supposed to link up with a French naval force in the English Channel, giving them a significant numerical advantage. However, most of the French ships were based in the Mediterranean Sea, and despite leaving Toulon in April, delays meant they failed to arrive in time. One contemporary diplomat suggested the relatively new and inexperienced French navy did so deliberately, being "dismayed by the difficulties of the enterprise".

Nevertheless, the threat of French intervention forced the English to send a detachment to block the Strait of Dover, leaving 60 ships facing a Dutch fleet of around 84. In the initial stages of the Four Days' Battle, fought from 11 to 15 June, the Dutch inflicted heavy damage on their opponents. After the return of the detached squadron, depleted ammunition stocks forced both sides to break off the engagement. The English lost ten ships compared to only four Dutch, but any hope the Royal Navy was too damaged to renew hostilities soon proved incorrect.

After extensive repairs, the English fleet put to sea again and confronted the Dutch in the St. James's Day Battle of 4 and 5 August. Generally considered an English victory, it ultimately had little strategic value. Although the Dutch suffered heavy casualties and many ships were badly damaged, their fleet remained intact, while lack of money meant the English could scarcely afford to pay their sailors or purchase supplies. A more significant economic loss occurred on 19 August, when up to 150 Dutch merchantmen sheltering in the Vlie estuary were destroyed in an action known as Holmes's Bonfire.

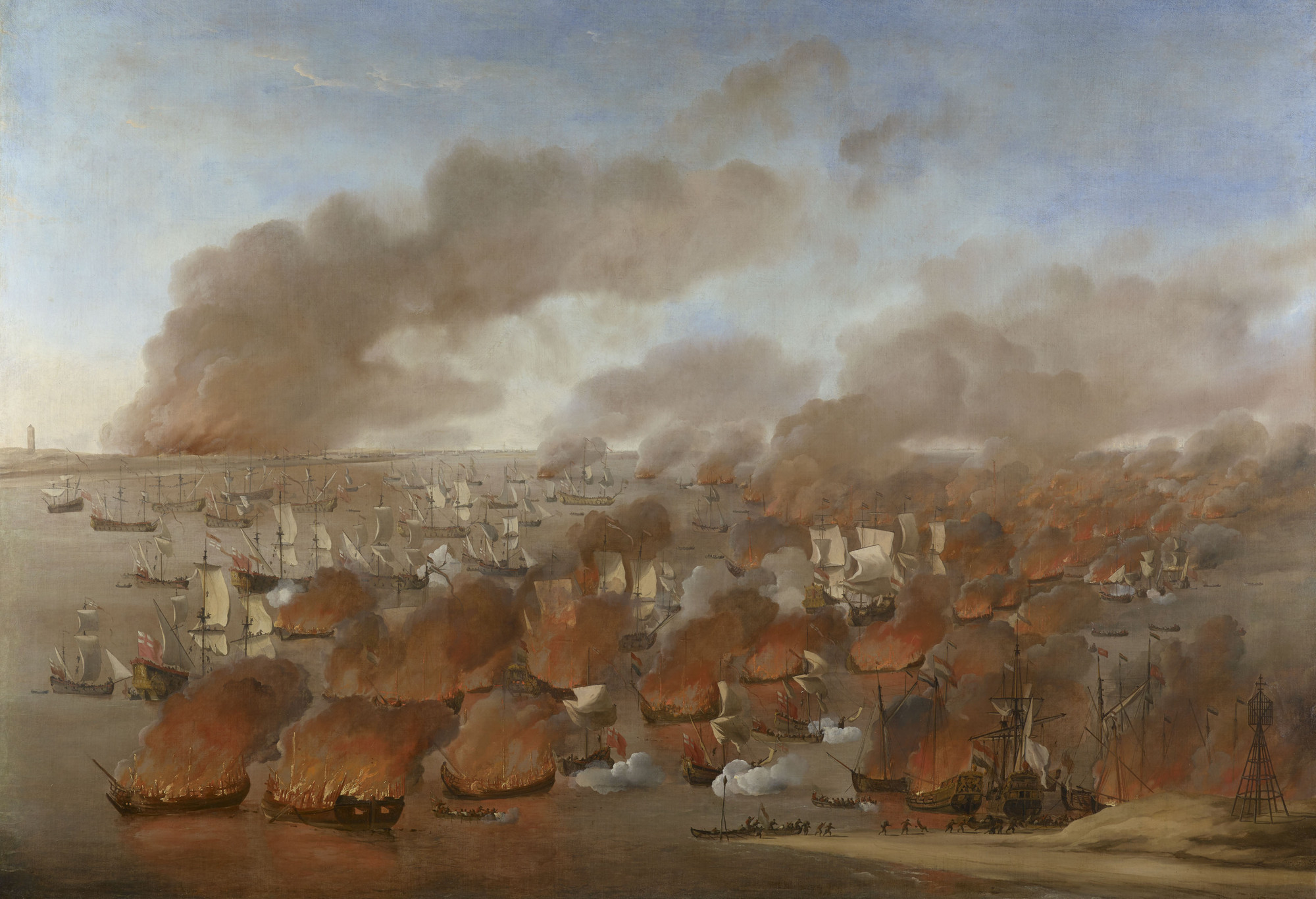
Holmes's Bonfire, by Willem van de Velde the Elder

Over a period of eighteen months from 1665 to 1666, the Great Plague of London killed more than a quarter of its population. In September 1666, the Fire of London destroyed much of the city, causing huge economic damage, and public opinion now turned against the war. Charles could no longer rely on London merchants to supply the loans needed to fund it, and the Navy Board was forced to discharge many sailors unpaid.

Parliament was recalled for the first time in a year, and approved new taxes of £1.8 million. However, their payment was subject to various conditions, and disputes over these meant delays in its collection. Lack of money made it almost impossible to plan naval operations for 1667.

==== Europe; 1667 ====
By early 1667, lack of funds meant much of the Royal Navy was laid up at the naval base of Chatham. Only a small "Flying Fleet" was operational, leaving English merchant shipping vulnerable to Dutch attack. Since Charles refused to make the concessions to Parliament which would allow him to continue the war, his only option was to initiate peace talks, which began in March at Breda. As England was also now at war with France, Charles sent envoys to Paris for unofficial preliminary talks.

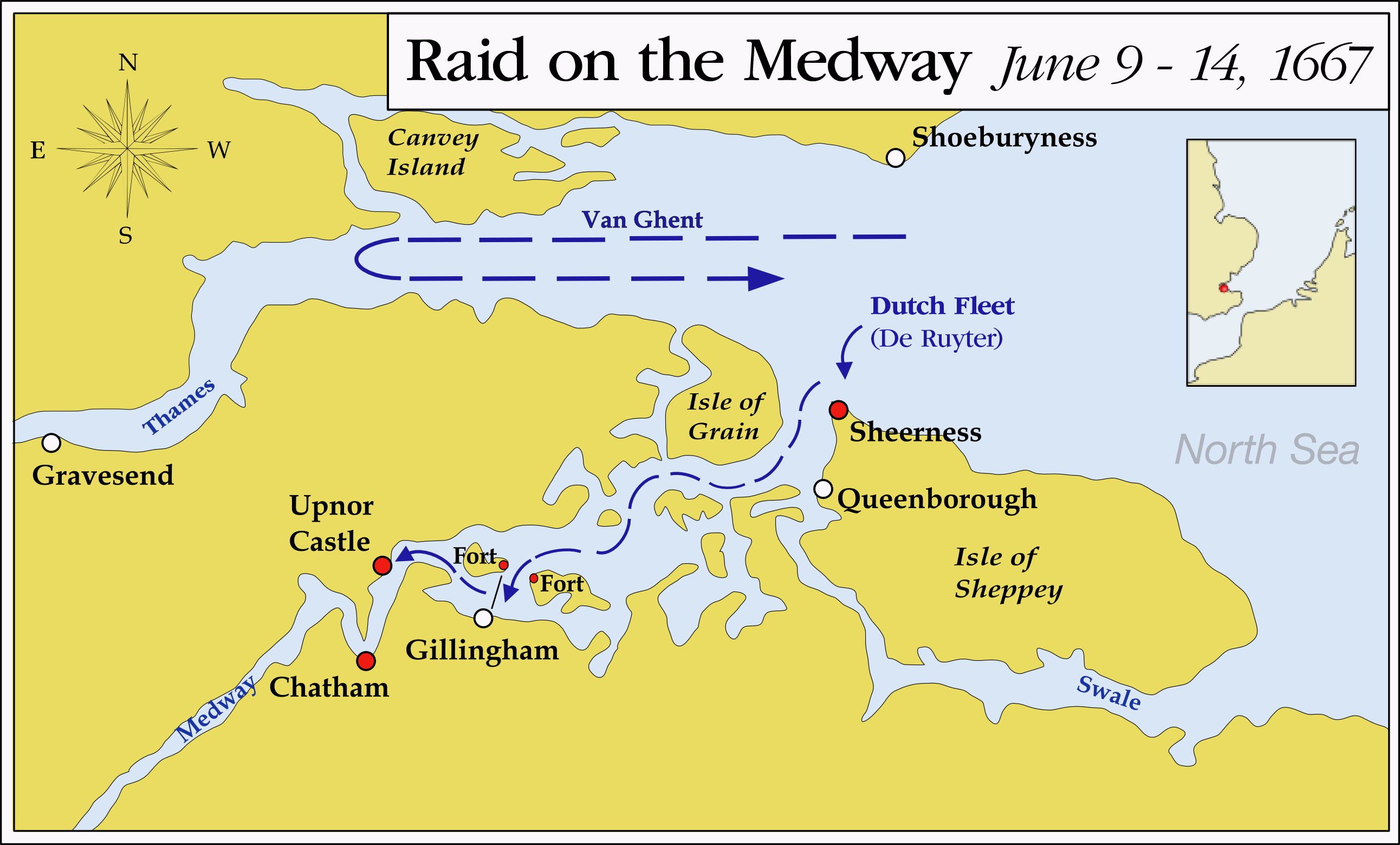
Raid on the Medway of 9–14 June 1667

The deterioration of Franco-Dutch relations meant these talks produced a third option not considered by Clarendon: a secret alliance with France. In April, Charles concluded his first secret treaty with Louis, stipulating England would not oppose a French conquest of the Spanish Netherlands. In May, the French invaded, starting the War of Devolution. By stalling the talks at Breda, Charles hoped to gain concessions from the Dutch, using the French advance as leverage.

Aware of Charles's general intentions, although not of the secret treaty, De Witt decided to attempt to end the war with a single stroke. The Dutch navy had made a special study of amphibious operations, with the Dutch Marine Corps established in 1665. After the Four Days' Battle, a marine contingent had been ready to land in Kent or Essex following a possible Dutch victory at sea. The Dutch fleet was, however, in 1666 unable to force a safe passage into the Thames as navigational buoys had been removed and a strong English squadron was ready to dispute their passage. With no English ships available to oppose a similar attack in 1667, de Witt planned to land marines at Chatham and destroy the ships there.

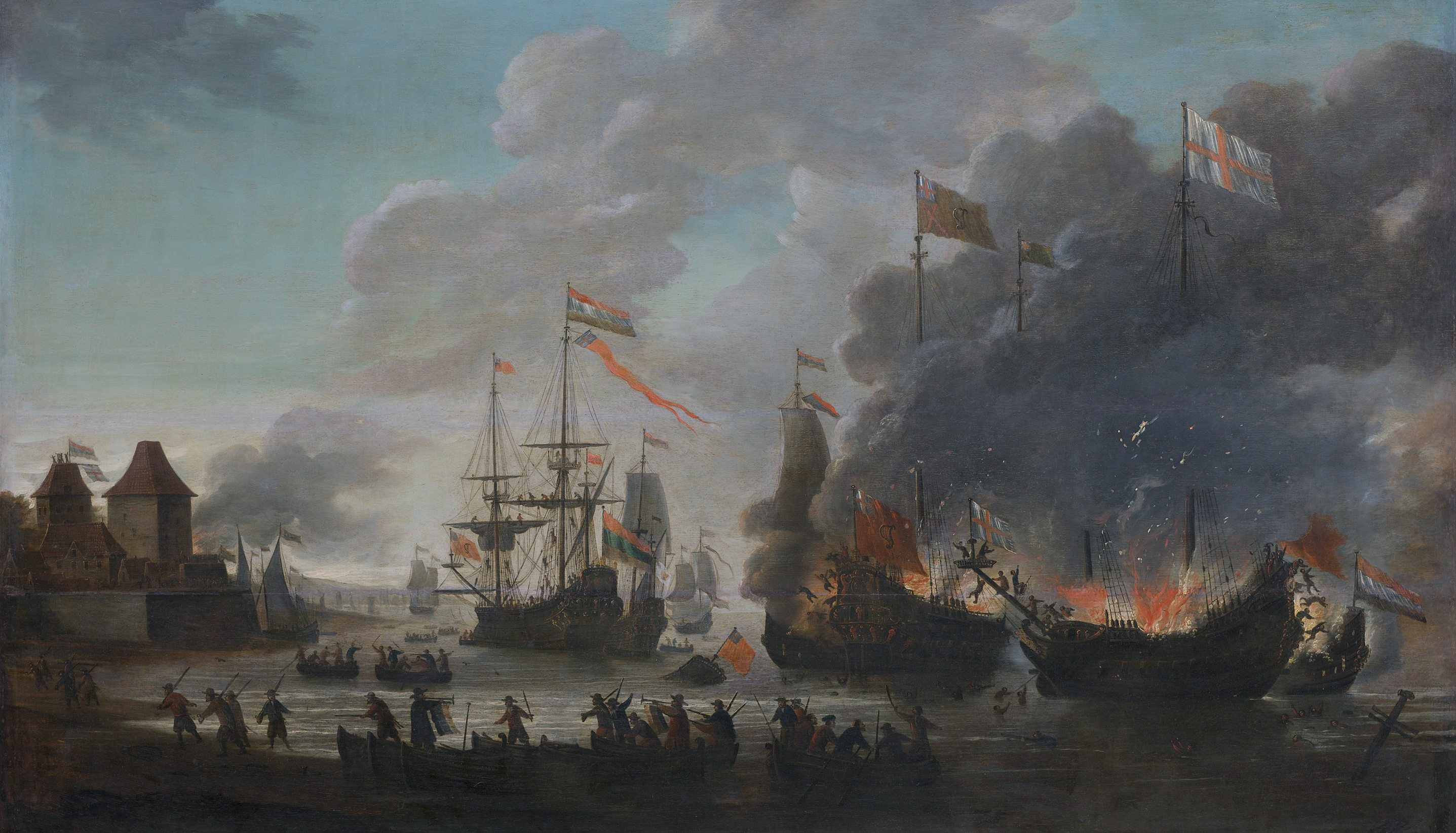
The Dutch burn English ships during the expedition to Chatham, by Jan van Leyden

In June, De Ruyter, with Cornelis de Witt supervising, launched the Dutch raid on the Medway at the mouth of the River Thames. After capturing the fort at Sheerness, the Dutch fleet went on to break through the massive chain protecting the entrance to the Medway and, on the 13th, attacked the laid up English fleet.

The raid had a substantial impact on English public opinion and remains one of the biggest disasters in Royal Navy history. Fifteen smaller ships were either destroyed or sunk as blockships by the English, with another three major warships burnt, Royal Oak, Loyal London and Royal James. HMS Royal Charles, was taken to the Netherlands as a trophy, although the Dutch failed to inflict substantial damage on the Chatham dockyards. In response, Clarendon ordered his envoys at Breda to agree terms without further delay, as Charles feared open revolt.

==== War in the Caribbean ====
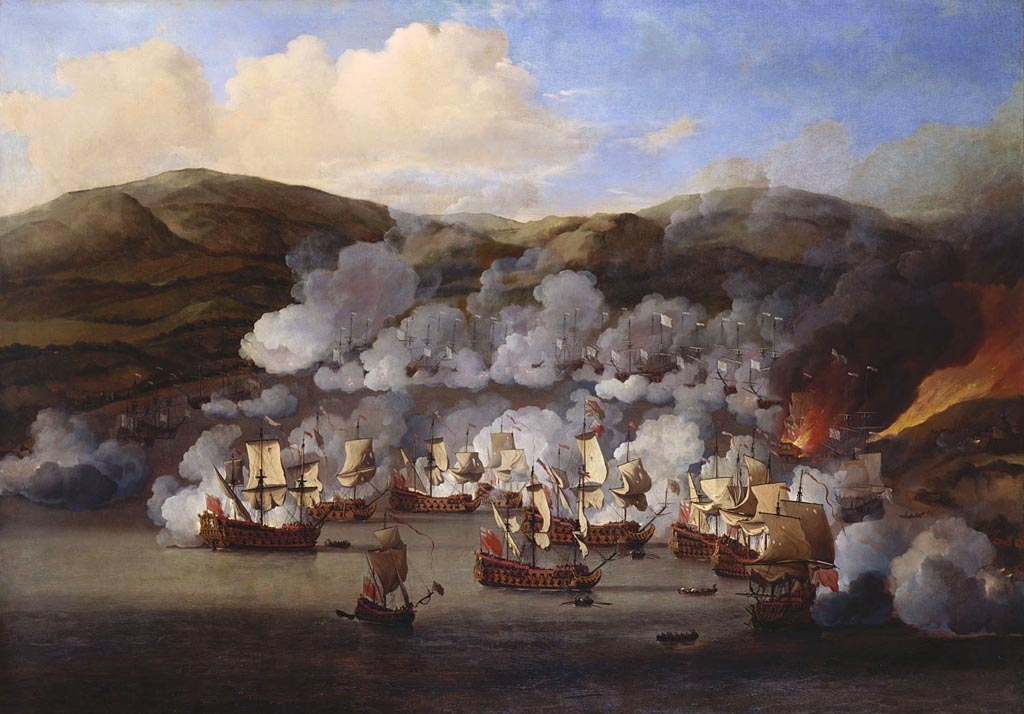
French ships under attack at Martinique, 1667

In early 1665 Michiel de Ruyter raided the Caribbean. In late 1665 an English force, mainly consisting of buccaneers under the command of Lieutenant-colonel Edward Morgan, the Deputy Governor of Jamaica, assisted by his nephew Thomas Morgan, quickly captured the Dutch islands of Sint Eustatius and Saba. After his uncle's death in December 1665, Thomas Morgan was appointed as governor of these two islands. Also in late 1665, an English force from Jamaica and Barbados captured the Dutch possession of Tobago. The French declaration of war on the side of the Dutch altered the balance of power in the Caribbean and facilitated a Dutch counterattack. The first successes of the new allies were the French recapture of Tobago in August 1666, a joint Franco-Dutch recapture of Sint Eustatius in November 1666 and a French capture of the English island of Antigua in the same month. The arrival of a French squadron under Joseph-Antoine de La Barre in January 1667 allowed the French to occupy the English half of St Kitts and Montserrat, leaving only Nevis of the Leeward Islands in English hands, together with Jamaica and Barbados to the west.

A Dutch force under Admiral Abraham Crijnssen, organised by the province of Zeeland, not the States General, arrived at Cayenne in February 1667 and captured Suriname from the English in the same month. Crijnssen delayed in Suriname until April, then sailed to Tobago, which had been vacated by the French after expelling the English garrison, where he rebuilt the fort and left a small garrison. Although Crijnssen was instructed not to delay, it was not until early May that he and de La Barre combined forces, agreeing to a Franco-Dutch invasion of Nevis, which sailed on 17 May 1667. However, their attack was repelled in the Battle of Nevis on 17 May by a smaller English force. This confused naval action was the only one in this war where all three navies fought: it failed largely through de la Barre's incompetence. After this failed attack, Crijnssen left in disgust and sailed to the north to attack the Virginia colony, while the French, under de la Barre, moved to Martinique. The Battle of Nevis restored English naval control in the Caribbean and allowed the early recapture of Antigua and Montserrat and an unsuccessful attack on St Kitts soon after.

In April, a new English squadron of nine warships and two fireships under the command of Rear-Admiral Sir John Harman sailed for the West Indies, reaching them in early June. Harman encountered the French with seven larger and 14 smaller warships and three fireships under la Barre anchored under the batteries of Fort St Pierre, Martinique. He attacked on 6 July and sunk, burnt or captured all but two of the French ships. With the French fleet neutralised, Harman then attacked the French at Cayenne on 15 September forcing its garrison to surrender. The English fleet then went on to recapture Fort Zeelandia in Suriname in October. News of these English victories only reached England in September, after the Treaty of Breda had been signed, and possessions captured after 31 July had to be returned. Crijnssen sailed back to the Caribbean only to find the French fleet destroyed and the English back in possession of Suriname.

== Aftermath ==
=== Treaty of Breda ===
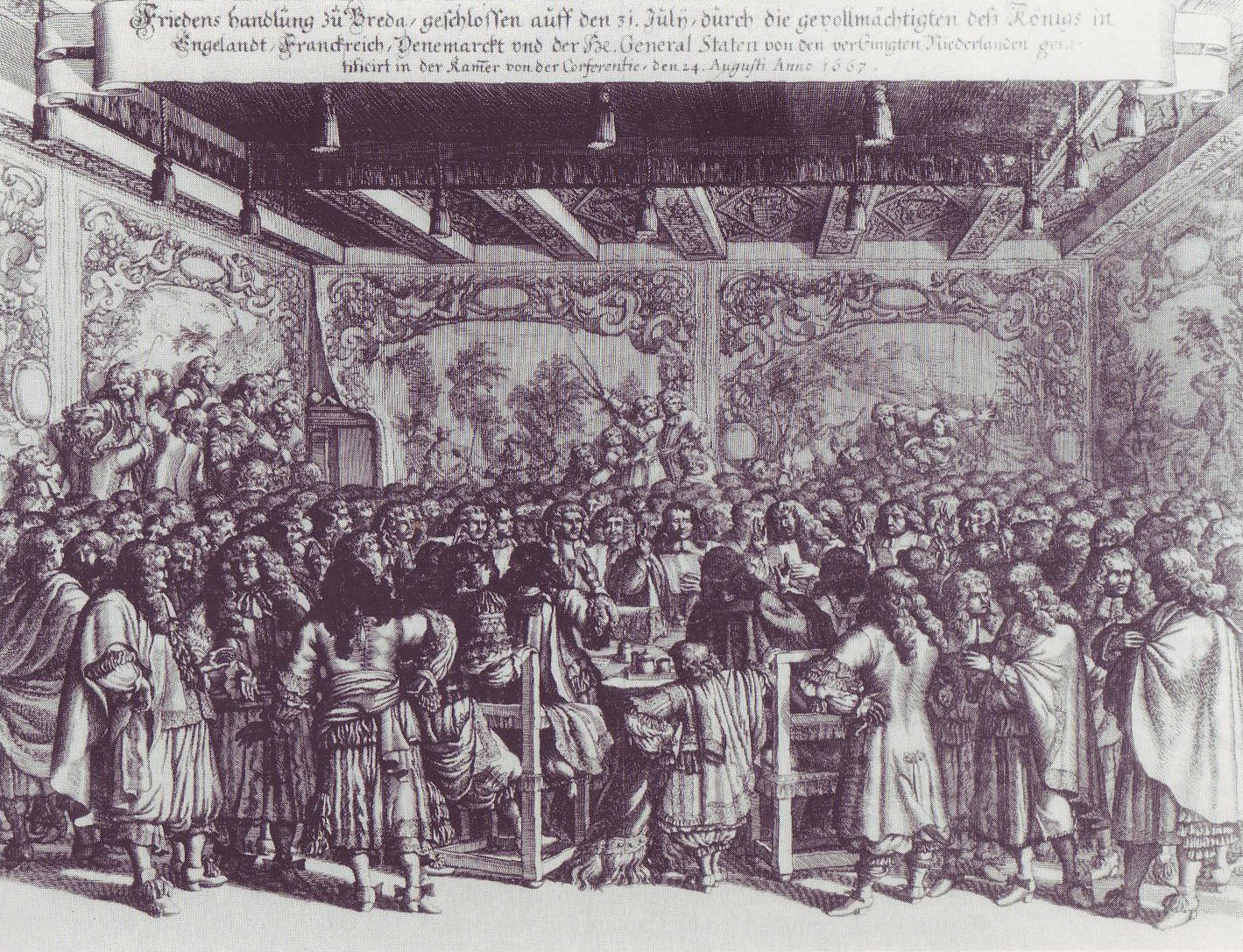
The conclusion of the Treaty of Breda, at Breda Castle

On 31 July 1667, what is generally known as the Treaty of Breda concluded peace between England and the Netherlands. Under normal cirumstances the Dutch victory in the Medway would probably have been followed by new demands, but the large scale French invasion of the Spanish Netherlands meant that the English came off lightly. Fears of growing French power meant that Johan de Witt and many of his fellow Dutch regenten preferred a quick end to the war with the English.

The treaty allowed the English to keep possession of New Netherland, while the Dutch kept control over Pulau Run, Fort Cormantin and the valuable sugar plantations of Suriname, while also regaining Tobago, St Eustatius, and its West African trading posts. This uti possidetis solution was later confirmed in the Treaty of Westminster. The Act of Navigation was modified in favour of the Dutch by England agreeing to treat the German states as part of the Netherlands' commercial hinterland, so that Dutch ships would now be allowed to carry German goods to English ports. The English were also forced to accept the Dutch 'Free Ship, Free Goods' principle.

On the same date and also at Breda, a public treaty was concluded between England and France that stipulated the return to England of the former English part of St Christopher and the islands of Antigua and Montserrat, all of which the French had occupied in the war, and that England should surrender its claim to Acadia to France, although the extent of Acadia was not defined. This public treaty had been preceded by a secret treaty signed on 17 April in which, in addition to these exchanges of territory, Louis and Charles agreed not to enter into alliances opposed to the interests of the other, by which Louis secured the neutrality of England in the war he planned against Spain.

The order of priorities whereby the Dutch preferred to give up what would become a major part of the United States, and instead retain a tropical colony, would seem strange by present-day standards. However, in the 17th century tropical colonies producing agricultural products which could not be grown in Europe were deemed more valuable than ones with a climate similar to that of Europe where Europeans could settle in comfort.

The peace was generally seen as a personal triumph for Johan de Witt and an embarrassment to the Orangists, who seemed reluctant to support the war and eager to accept a disadvantageous early peace. The Republic was jubilant about the Dutch victory. De Witt used the occasion to induce four provinces to adopt the Perpetual Edict of 1667 abolishing the stadtholderate forever. However, De Witt also faced criticism. The war exposed a severe neglect of the Dutch army, which had struggled to repel the invasion of the Bishop of Münster. The situation only shifted in the Republic's favor after the arrival of 6,000 French auxiliary troops. In addition, the diplomatic situation also seemed bleak for the Dutch. A French conquest of the Spanish Netherlands could only be stopped by entering an alliance with England.

The next year Johan de Witt entered the Triple Alliance of 1668 with England, although reluctantly, as he considered Charles II an untrustworthy ally. The Alliance between the Dutch Republic, England and Sweden was formed to mediate between France and Spain and forced Louis to temporarily abandon his plans for the conquest of the southern Netherlands. At first this seemed like another major diplomatic success for the Dutch, but de Witt's fears of English treachery proved justified. Charles had only entered the Triple Alliance to break the Franco-Dutch one. Both humiliated monarchs intensified their secret cooperation through the Secret Treaty of Dover and would, joined by the bishop of Münster, attack the Dutch in 1672 in the Third Anglo-Dutch War. Initially the Dutch Republic seemed unable to counter this attack, and De Witt was scapegoated. He resigned and the young William III became stadtholder. That same year de Witt was assassinated.

== Sources ==
- Armitage, D. (2000). The Ideological Origins of the British Empire. Cambridge: Cambridge University Press. ISBN 9780521789783.
- Ashley, M. P. (1961). Great Britain to 1688: A Modern History. Ann Arbor: University of Michigan Press. OCLC 875337369.
- Brinkmann, C. (1906). "Charles II and the Bishop of Münster in the Anglo-Dutch War of 1665–6". The English Historical Review. 21 (84): 686–698. doi:10.1093/ehr/XXI.LXXXIV.686. JSTOR 550398.
- Boxer, C. R. (1974). The Anglo-Dutch Wars of the 17th Century, 1652–1674. London: H.M.S.O. ISBN 9780112901693.
- Bruijn, J. R. (2011). The Dutch Navy of the Seventeenth and Eighteenth Centuries. Oxford: Oxford University Press. ISBN 9780986497353.
- Davenport, F. G. (2004). European Treaties Bearing on the History of the United States and Its Dependencies. Clark, N.J.: The Lawbook Exchange. ISBN 9781584774228.
- Fox, F. L. (2018). The Four Days' Battle of 1666. Barnsley: Seaforth. ISBN 9781526737274.
- Geyl, P (1936). "Johan de Witt, Grand Pensionary of Holland, 1653–72". History. 20 (80): 303–319. doi:10.1111/j.1468-229X.1936.tb00103.x. JSTOR 24401084.
- Goslinga, C. C. (2012). A Short History of the Netherlands Antilles and Surinam. The Hague: Springer. ISBN 9789400992894.
- Graham, E. J. (1982). "The Scottish Marine during the Dutch Wars". The Scottish Historical Review. 61 (1): 67–74. JSTOR 25529449.
- Groenveld, S. (1991). "Popery, Trade and Universal Monarchy". The Historical Journal. 34 (4): 955–972–29. doi:10.1017/S0018246X00017386. JSTOR 2639590. S2CID 153421486.
- Hainsworth, D. R.; Churches, C. (1998). The Anglo-Dutch Naval Wars, 1652–1674. Stroud: Sutton. ISBN 9780750917872.
- Hutton, Ronald (1989). Charles the Second: King of England, Scotland, and Ireland. Oxford University Press. ISBN 9780198229117.
- Israel, J. I. (1995). The Dutch Republic: Its Rise, Greatness, and Fall, 1477–1806. Oxford University Press. ISBN 9780198730729.
- Hughes, E. (1934). Studies in Administration and Finance 1558–1825. Manchester University Press.
- Jackson, Clare (2021). Devil-land: England under siege, 1588 to 1688. Allen Lane. ISBN 978-0241285817.
- Jones, J. R. (2013). The Anglo-Dutch Wars of the Seventeenth Century. New York: Routledge. ISBN 9781315845975.
- Kloster, W. (2016). The Dutch Moment: War, Trade, and Settlement in the Seventeenth-Century Atlantic World. Ithaca: Cornell University Press. ISBN 9781501706677.
- Le Couteur, Penny; Burreson, Jay (2003). Napoleon's Buttons: How 17 Molecules Changed History. Jeremy Tarcher. ISBN 978-1585422203.
- Lynn, J. A. (1999). The Wars of Louis XIV, 1664–1714. London: Longman. ISBN 9780582056299.
- MacInnes, A. I. (2008). "Scottish Circumvention". Making, Using and Resisting the Law in European History. Pisa: PUP. pp. 109–130. ISBN 9788884925497.
- Miller, John (1991). Charles II. Weidenfeld & Nicolson. ISBN 978-0297812142.
- Molhuysen, P. C.; Blok, P. J. (1911). Nieuw Nederlandsch Biografisch Woordenboek. Leiden: Sijthoff.
- Murdoch, Steve (2010). The Terror of the Seas? Scottish Maritime Warfare, 1513–1713. Leiden: Brill Academic Publishers. ISBN 978900418568-5.
- Ogg, D. (1934). England in the Reign of Charles II. Oxford University Press. pp. 357–388. OCLC 490944369.
- Palmer, M. A.J. (April 1997). "The 'Military Revolution' Afloat: The Era of the Anglo-Dutch Wars and the Transition to Modern Warfare at Sea". War in History. 4 (2): 123–149. doi:10.1177/096834459700400201. JSTOR 26004420. S2CID 159657621.
- Pincus, S. C. A. (1992). "Popery, Trade and Universal Monarchy". Engl. Hist. Rev. 107 (4): 1–29. doi:10.1093/ehr/CVII.CCCCXXII.1. JSTOR 575674.
- Pincus, S. C. A. (2002). Protestantism and Patriotism: Ideologies and the Making of English Foreign Policy. Cambridge University Press. ISBN 9780521893688.
- Pomfret, J. E. (1973). Colonial New Jersey: A History. New York: Scribner. ISBN 9780684133713.
- Raa, F.J.G. ten; de Bas, François (1921). Het Staatsche leger, 1568–1795 Dl. V, Van het sluiten van den vrede o Munster tot de verheffing van Prins Willem III van Oranje tot kapitein- en admiraal-generaal der Vereenigde Nederlanden, (1648–1672). Breda: Koninklijke Militaire Academie.
- Rodger, N. A. M. (2004). The Command of the Ocean: A Naval History of Britain, 1649–1815. London: Penguin. ISBN 9780713994117.
- Rommelse, G. (2006). The Second Anglo-Dutch War (1665–1667). Hilversum: Verloren. ISBN 9789065509079.
- Rommelse, G. (2010). "The role of mercantilism in Anglo-Dutch political relations, 1650–74". The Economic History Review. 63 (3): 591–611. doi:10.1111/j.1468-0289.2009.00491.x. JSTOR 40929818. S2CID 145077506.
- Rosende, Carlos (2019). "The 'Deepest Insult … since the Norman Invasion'". Naval History Magazine. 33 (1).
- Rowen, H. H. (1978). John de Witt: grand pensionary of Holland, 1625–1672. Princeton University Press. ISBN 9780691052472.
- Seaward, Paul (1987). "The House of Commons Committee of Trade and the Origins of the Second Anglo-Dutch War, 1664". The Historical Journal. 30 (2): 437–452. doi:10.1017/S0018246X00021518. S2CID 154665171.
- Sherman, Arnold A (1976). "Pressure from Leadenhall: The East India Company Lobby, 1660–1678". The Business History Review. 50 (3): 329–355. doi:10.2307/3112999. JSTOR 3112999. S2CID 154564220.
- Van der Aa, A. J. (1867). Biographische Woordenboek der Nederlandenen. Allart.
- Vries, P. (2015). State, Economy and the Great Divergence: Great Britain and China, 1680s–1850s. New York: Bloomsbury. ISBN 9781472529183.
- Wilson, C. W. (2012). Profit and Power: a Study of England and the Dutch Wars. The Hague: Springer. ISBN 9789401197625.
