= Thomas Teddeman =

English naval officer

Vice-Admiral Sir Thomas Teddeman
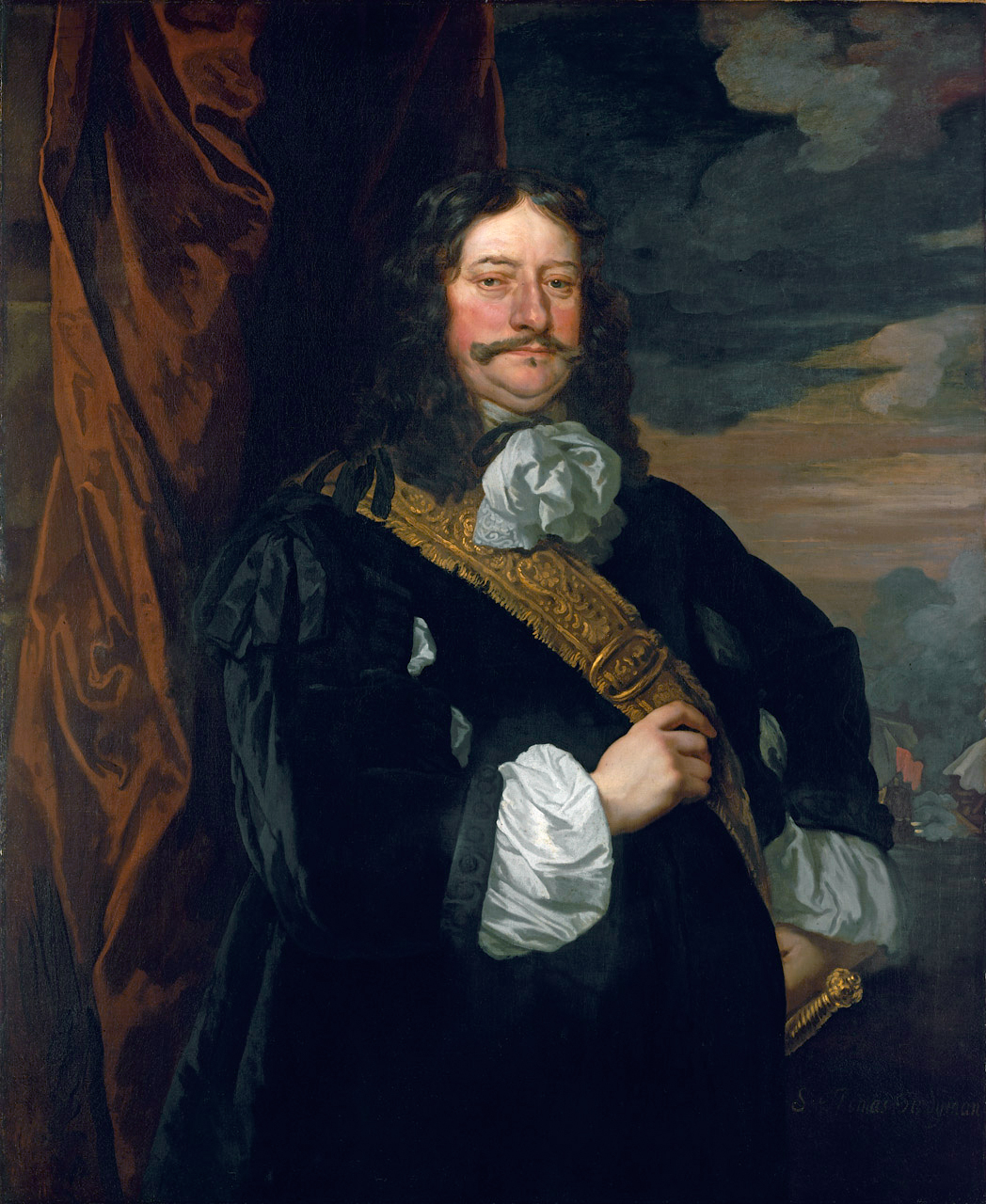
- Portrait by Sir Peter Lely, 1666
- Died: 13 May 1668
- Military career
- Allegiance: England
- Branch: Royal Navy
- Service years: ?–1668
- Rank: Vice-admiral
- Commands: Tredagh; HMS Fairfax; HMS Kent; HMS Revenge; HMS Swiftsure; HMS Cambridge
- Conflicts: Anglo-Spanish War (1654); Second Anglo-Dutch War; Battle of Lowestoft; Battle of Vågen; Four Days Battle; St James's Day Battle

Vice-Admiral Sir Thomas Teddeman (died 23 May 1668) was an English naval officer. His name was also written as Teddiman, Tyddiman or Teddyman. The early career of Teddeman is unknown; he was not a naval captain during the First Anglo-Dutch War. He was the namesake of his father, who descended from a family of ship-owners in Dover. His cousin was the naval captain Henry Teddeman.

Teddeman, first serving the English Commonwealth, commanded from 1659 till 1660 the Tredagh (after the English Restoration renamed to HMS Resolution) in the Mediterranean during the Anglo-Spanish War. From 31 May till 10 June 1660 he chased six Spanish vessels he encountered off Algiers. In May 1661 he became captain of HMS Fairfax and in 1663 commanded HMS Kent on which he brought the English ambassador to Russia, the Earl of Carlisle, to Archangel in July. In May 1664 Teddeman was made commander of HMS Revenge and the same year promoted to captain of HMS Swiftsure. In 1665, during the Second Anglo-Dutch War, he distinguished himself as rear admiral of the Blue Squadron in the Battle of Lowestoft, with as flagship the new second rate HMS Royal Katherine, and was knighted on 30 June (Old Style).

In August 1665 Teddeman was sent on the Revenge to Bergen to capture a Dutch treasure fleet with a flotilla of frigates but was defeated in the Battle of Vågen by Commandeur Pieter de Bitter. Though this was a major disappointment to Charles II of England, Teddeman's career did not suffer much and he fought, again on the Katherine, the next year as vice admiral of the Blue in the Four Days Battle and as vice-admiral of the White in the St James's Day Battle. In 1667 Teddeman had no command, the main vessels of the English fleet having been laid up. In 1668 he commanded on HMS Cambridge, but was the subject of an investigation by English Parliament, trying to establish the causes of the lost war, by which he was much troubled. On 13 May he died from a fever caused by a thrush in the mouth.

== Literature ==
R.C. Anderson, 1964, List of English Naval Captains 1642–1660
